= Petőfi Sándor MME Pancsova =

Hungarian folk dances and songs

- Hungarian folk traditions
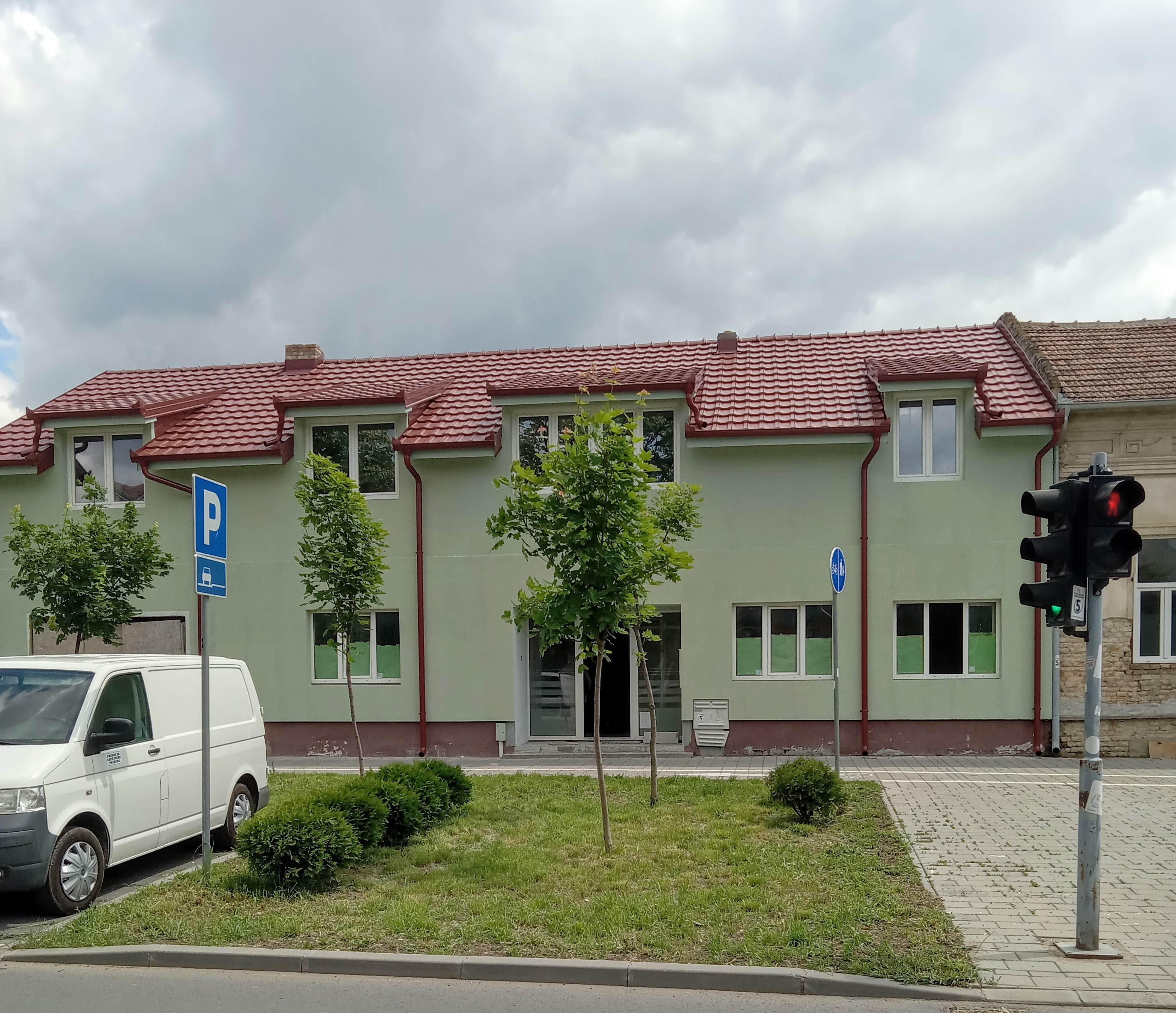
- Home of the Petőfi Society
- Short name: KIE
- Former name: Hungarian Cultural Circle (Magyar Kultúrkör)
- Founded: 1946; 80 years ago
- Location: Cara Lazara 19, Pančevo 301116, Serbia
- Website: Official website Official website
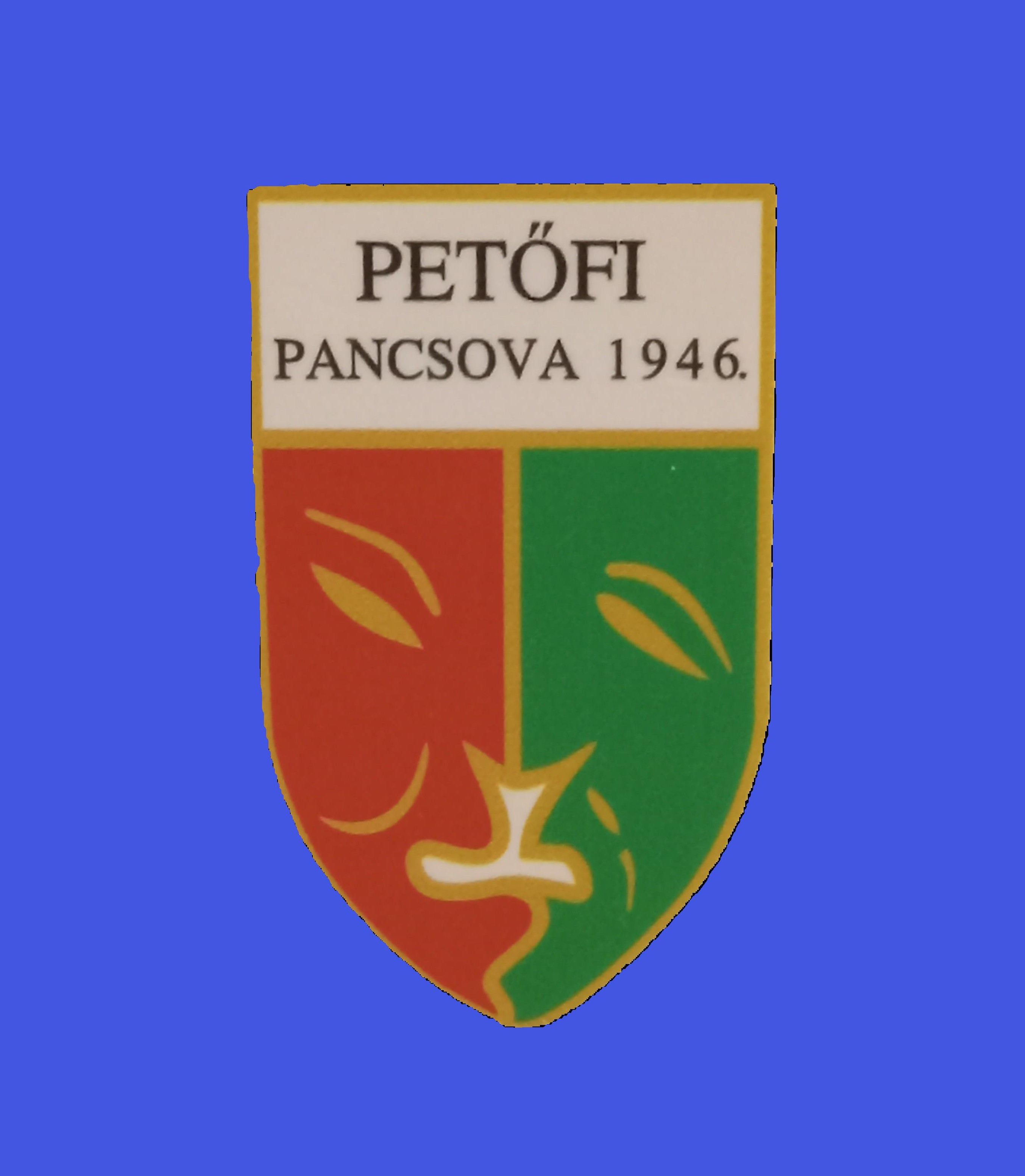

Hungarian Cultural Association Petőfi Sándor Pančevo (Hungarian: Magyar művelődési egyesület Petőfi Sándor Pancsova Serbian: Мађарско културно уметничко друштво Петофи Шандор Панчево); At the initiative of a large number of Hungarians from Pančevo and Vojlovica, on June 1, 1946, in the presence of 150-170 interested individuals, the "Hungarian Cultural Circle" was founded. The goals set at the founding assembly were: Establishing an amateur acting group, spreading Hungarian folk culture, restoring and operating a library, organizing an illiteracy course, distributing the press, building a Hungarian headquarters, and establishing a choir and a musical group.

In August 1947, the Hungarian Cultural Circle (Magyar Kultúrkör) took over the premises of the KIE, which was owned by the Reformed Church, for a certain, unknown, amount of money. The legal successor of the Hungarian Cultural Circle, today's MKUD Sándor Petőfi, has its headquarters in these premises. Since the foundation of the Association, i.e. from 1946 to 2010, more than 1900 events of various content and nature have been held, from cultural ones such as drama and singing performances to economic and political performances.

== History ==
The first cultural and artistic societies that fostered Hungarian culture in the territory of today's Pančevo were founded around 1880. The society had about 600 members and fostered choral singing, a theater, a reading room with a music and recitation section, and all of this was accompanied by library work. The work of these societies and sections ceased in 1919 with Pančevo's entry into the new state of Kingdom of Yugoslavia, and the number of Hungarians, now a national minority, fell from 2,100 to 870 souls. As a result, years of very weak cultural life in the city followed.

At the end of the 1930s, the cultural and artistic life of the Hungarians in Pančevo was revived. In 1938, the “Christian Youth Association” KIE (Keresztyén Ifjúsági Egyesület — KIE) was founded within the Reformed Christian Church, which gave rise to the popular name for the building, the Hungarian Home. As an association, the theater scene was primarily nurtured, the music program was developed, and almost forgotten folk dances and songs were revived. During World War II, the KIE did not cease to be a cultural institution. The KIE continued its work as a collective member of the “Hungarian Cultural Association” (Magyar Művelődési Szövetségnek), which operates under the auspices of the “DMKSZ”. The founder and president of the KIE is the pastor of the Reformed Church Árpád Baksa, the choirmaster Antal Varga, then Elémer Korsós, and the head of the children's programs is the venerable Mrs. Árpádne Baksa. The choreographer of the Hungarian games is Istvan Bély. The society then had 50 members. The KIE presented its first performance in the Tekészék Club, which is the premises of today's boxing club. The singing circle (Pancsovai Magyar Dalkör) was founded on April 30, 1940, with 81 members, led by teacher Géza Ambrus. The association also formed an amateur theater section, whose director was János Kalócsáy, one of those who performed on stage in 1925 and 1926. The president is Dr. Pál Akos Loc, a lawyer. The singing section, the "Dalker", operated in the premises of the former "Tarshasker" building. The KIE and the Dalker were disbanded at the end of 1944.

The cultural life of the Hungarian minority was relaunched in 1946 with the establishment of the “Hungarian Cultural Center”. The initial performances were organized to celebrate the liberation from fascism after WW II. At that time, all cultural and artistic activities were planned by the “Cultural Union of Vojvodina Hungarians” (Vajdasági Magyar Kultúrszövetség)

In August 1947, the Cultural Center purchased the building, where the KIE was previously located, from the Reformed Church and became the legal successor of the former society. It was then that the new official name of the society “MME Sándor Petőfi” (Magyar művelődési egyesület Petőfi Sándor) appeared for the first time.

== Society activities ==
The early years of the Society are considered the most fruitful years for the acting section. The acting section presented dozens of three-act plays and one-act plays. Members of the Petőfi Society were among the founders of the ″South Banat Hungarian Cultural and Artistic Societies Festival″ in 1969. Petőfi players participated for the first time in 1973 at the Gyöngyösbokréta festival, and the zither players in 1979 at the Durindó festival. The Petőfi Society of Pančevo, together with the Tamás Áron Society of Vojlovica, fosters the traditions of the Székelys. The Petőfi Society is a regular participant in cultural and artistic events both in the country of Serbia and abroad.

With the closure of Hungarian-language schools in Pančevo, in addition to cultural and artistic activities, the Petőfi Society continued to foster the Hungarian language through language workshops and regular Hungarian language classes in the Society's premises and in the ″Uroš Predić″ Gymnasium. All those who want to learn to speak Hungarian and also read and write are welcome to attend the classes. The classes are taught by Professor Krisztijan Varga.

The founding group from 1946 consisted of: Geza Ambrus, Dr. Sándor Karosz, Gustav Bajúsz, Ferenc Muci, Arpad Baksa, Lajos Nagy, János Braszny, Olga Nikolić, Erne Cirjak, József Olasz, István Cudar, Etelka Past, and Karol Csech, Katica Pinter, Dr. Aladar Debreceny, Géza Szabados, Karol Erdeliszky, Ödön Szabo, Károly Fekete, István Szel, Ernö Hegyi, Jene Seberle, József Ispanowicz, Lajos Szabo, István Juhász, Król Trzek Károly, Elemér Korsos, Dezsö Ujvari, Ferenc Kerekes, Antal Varga, Michaly Kaslik, János Varga, Henrik Kubik, and Imre Váradi. Pal Pajž was elected a member of the Yugoslav-Hungarian Cultural Society and a member of the Organizing Committee of the Pančovac Cultural Circle.

The presidents of the Society since its foundation have been

1. János Varga
2. Károly Fekete
3. Dr. Sándor Karósi
4. Pál Márton
5. Ernö Hegyi
6. János Jona
7. László Feldéssy
8. István Széll
9. Árpád András Bálint
10. Dezsö Kovács
11. István Barabás
12. Károly Lajko
13. Ernö Erdei
14. Attila Bálint
15. Károly Ranc

On April 27, 2010, a new board was elected.:

1. president − Károly Ranc
2. vice-president − Ernö Varga
3. secretary - Marija Trajković
4. treasurer — Milica Pap
5. accountant - Renata Svilar
6. librarian - Magdalena Doža

None of the above would have been, and will not be, possible without people with great souls. Many members planned, organized, directed, sang, acted, recited, acted, built... and they still do so today. With their work, they maintained/maintain the life of the Society. The number of members (1946-2010) is 1713, among whom are Dutch, Germans, Serbs, Slovaks, Bulgarians Palćeni... Today, around 3,700 Hungarians live in Pančevo. Our society rightfully considers itself an integral part of the local Hungarian national community, and within the framework of the unique Hungarian culture.

— Erdei Ernö,

== Gallery ==
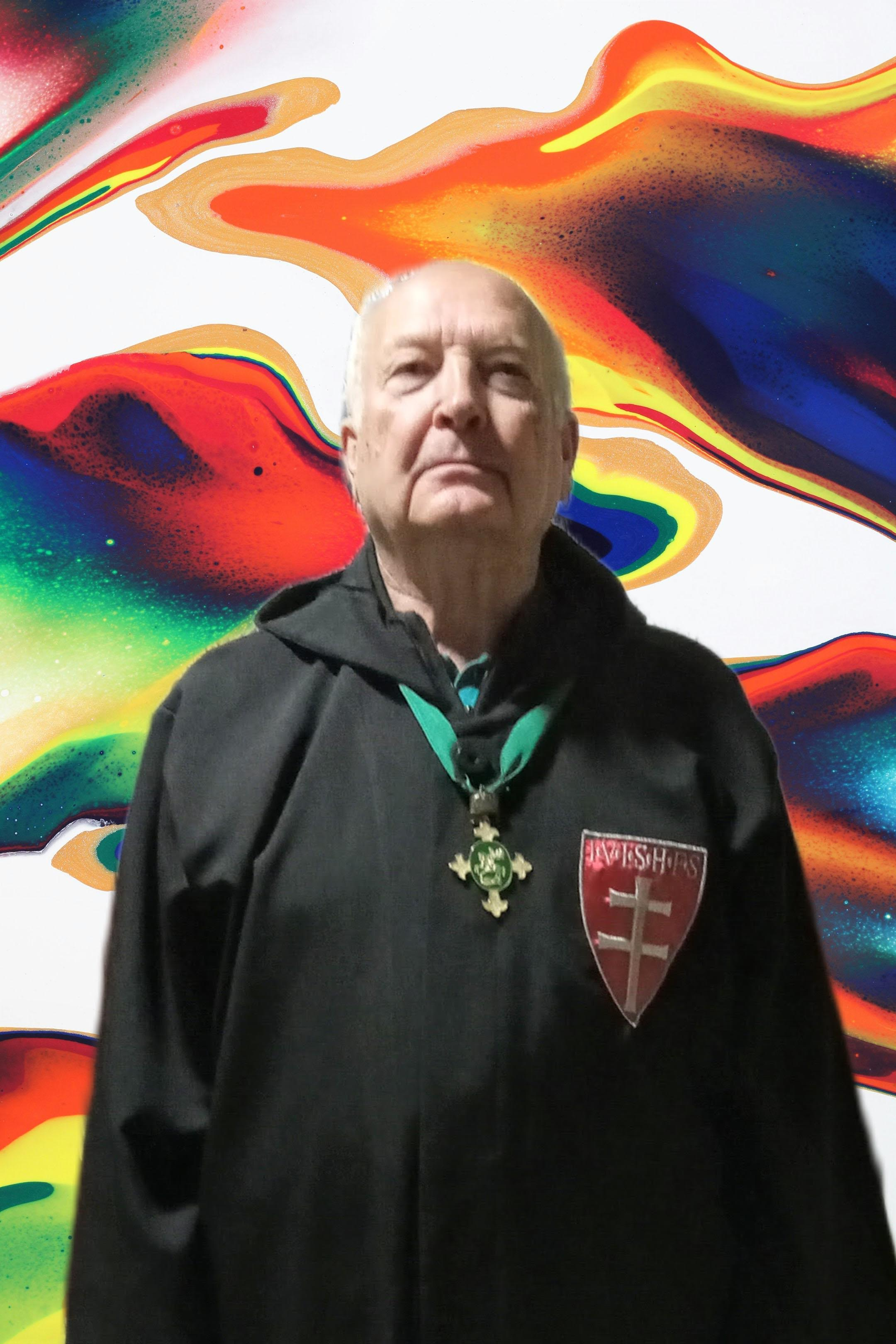
Károly Ranc, president of the society

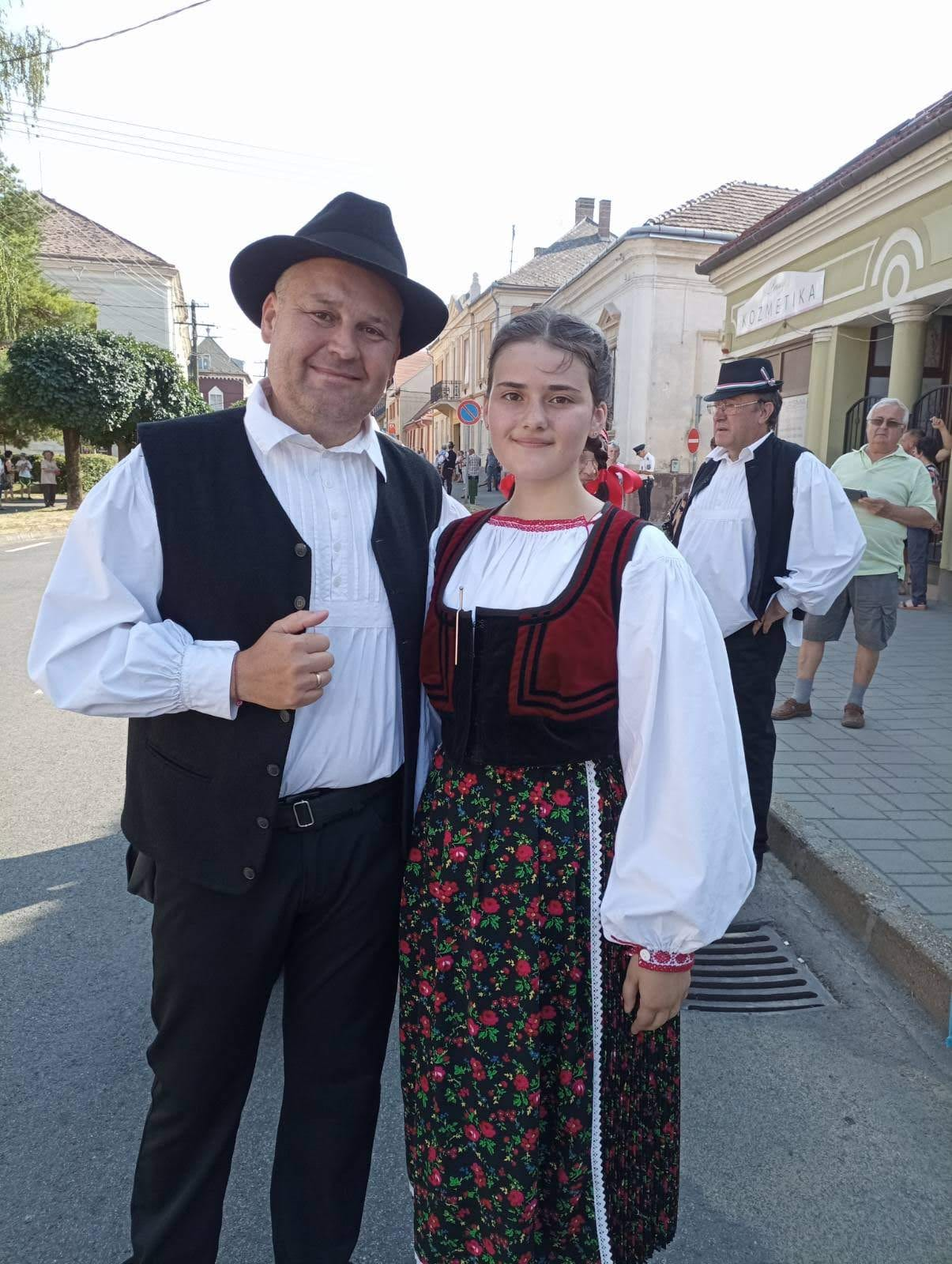
Shamu Kish, leader of the Chörömpölö orchestra

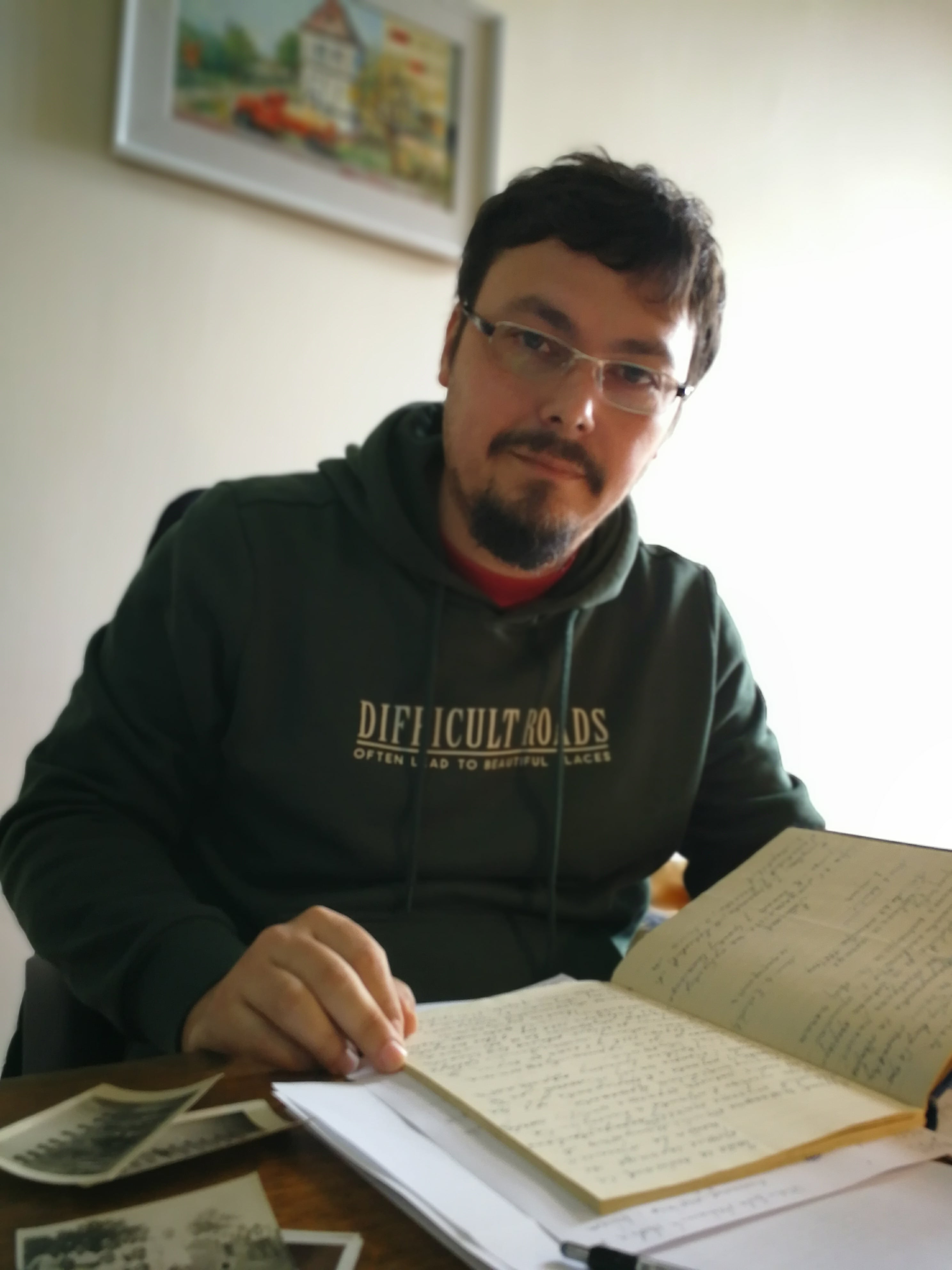
Kristian Varga, Hungarian language teacher

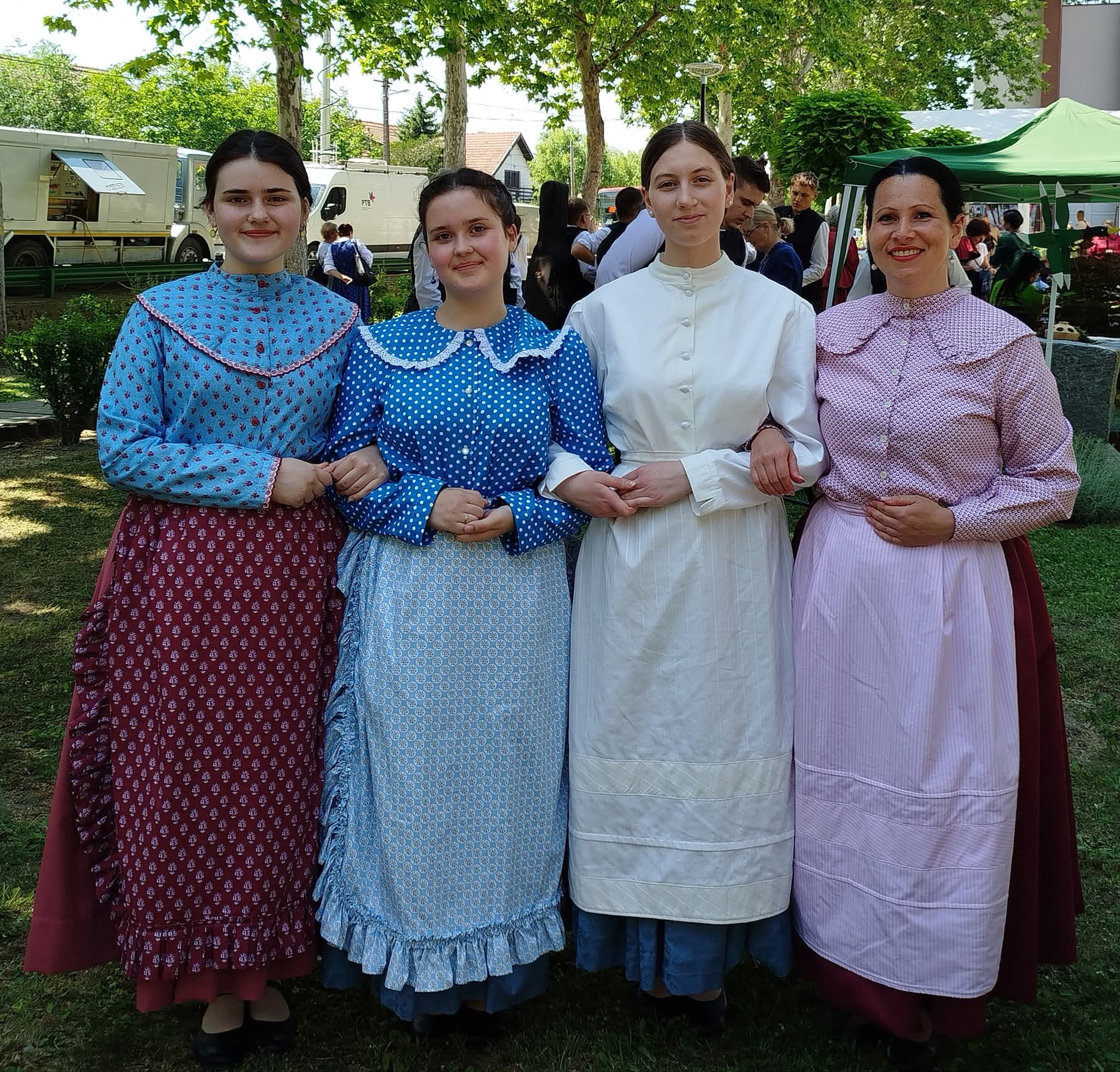
Pantljika, singing group

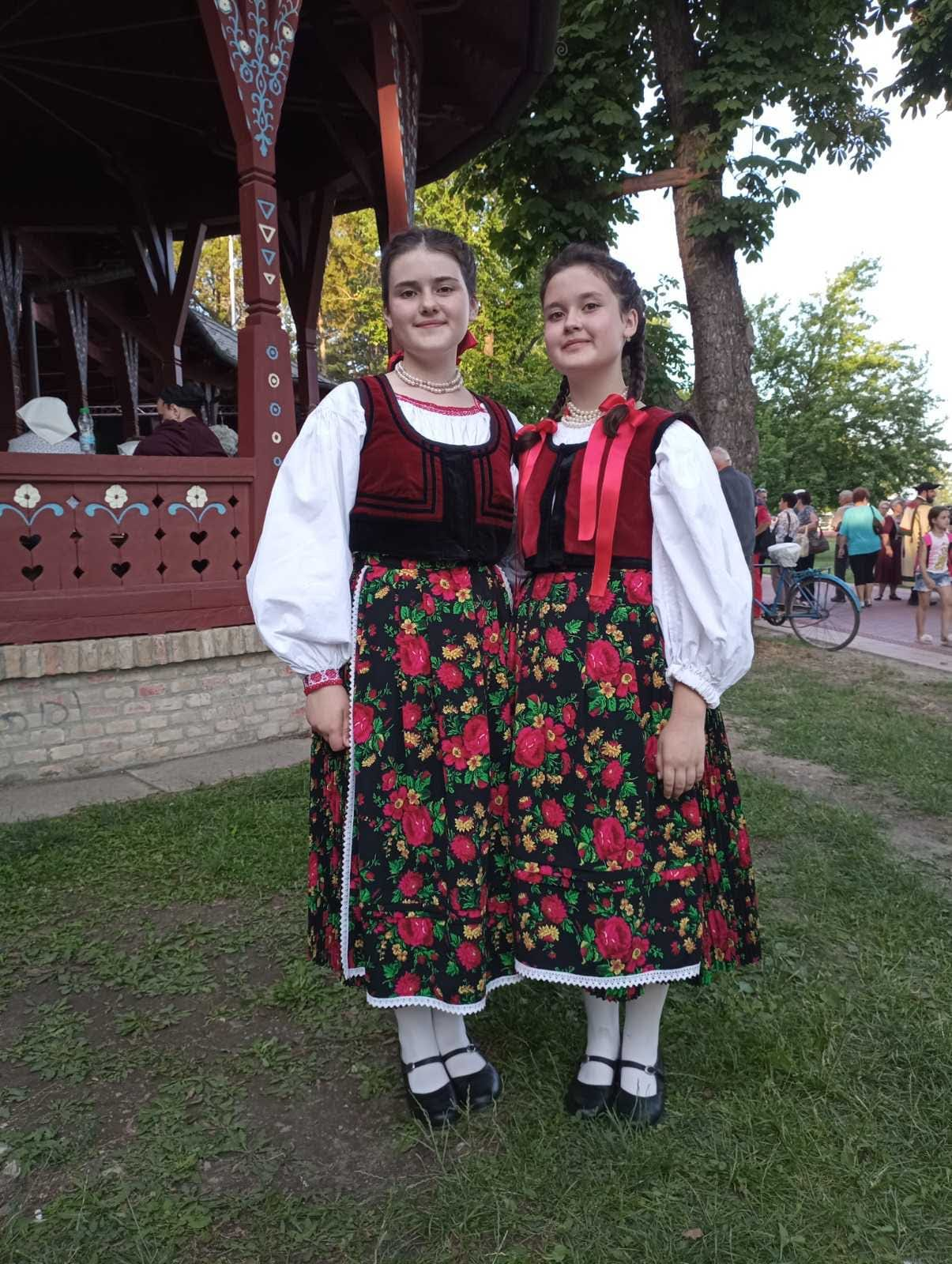
Székelys folk costume

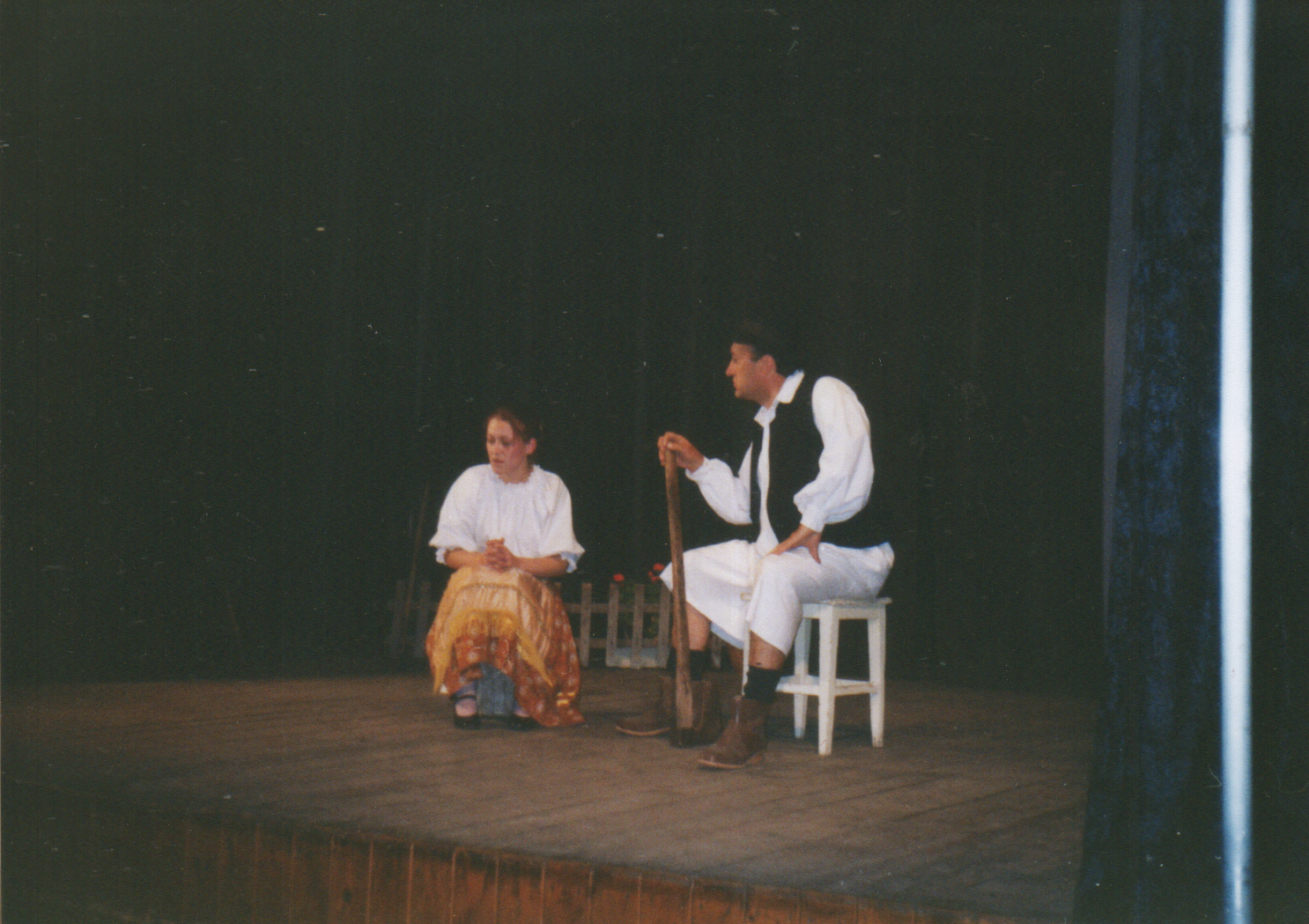
Drama section

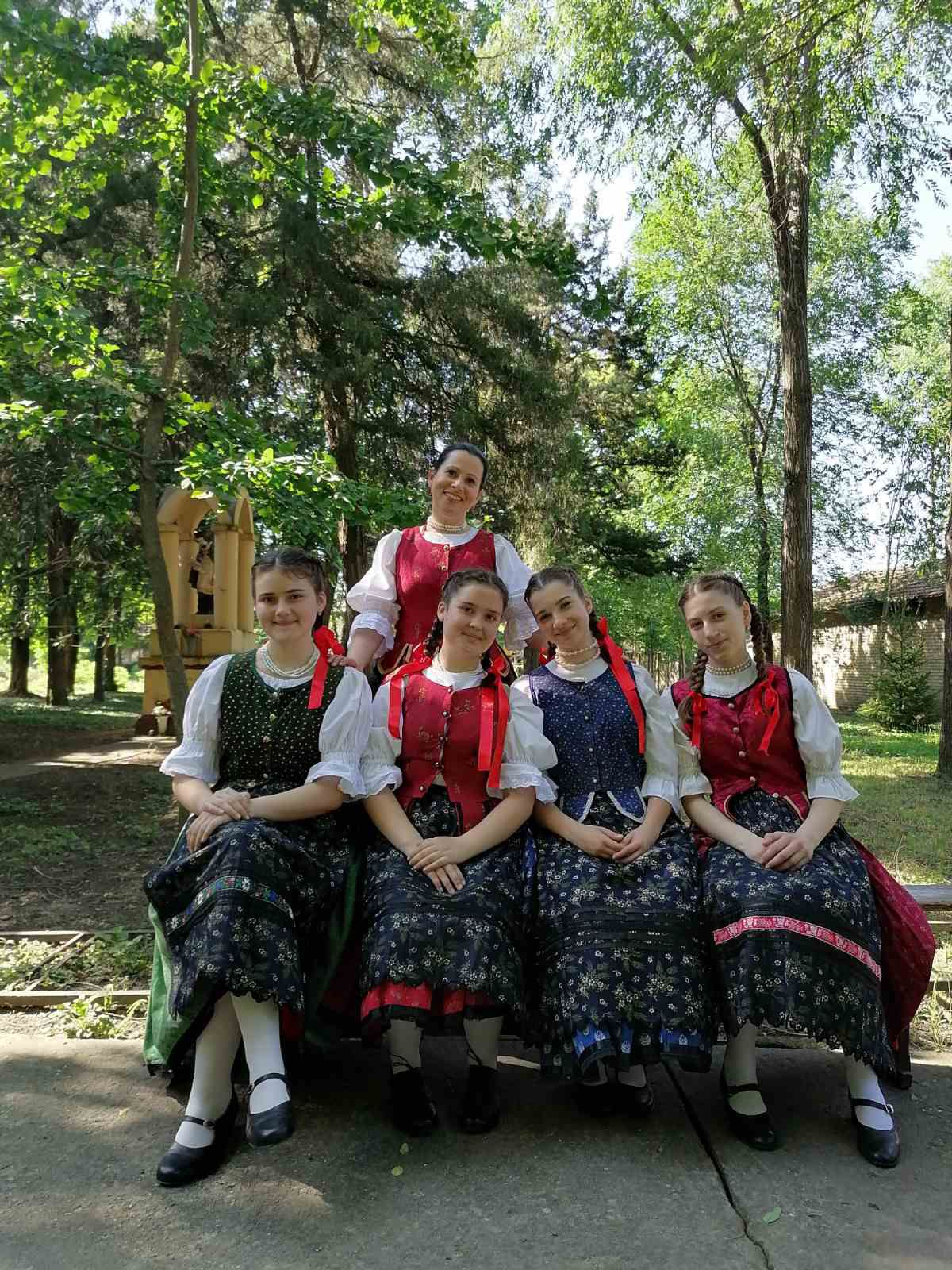
Pantljika in folk costume

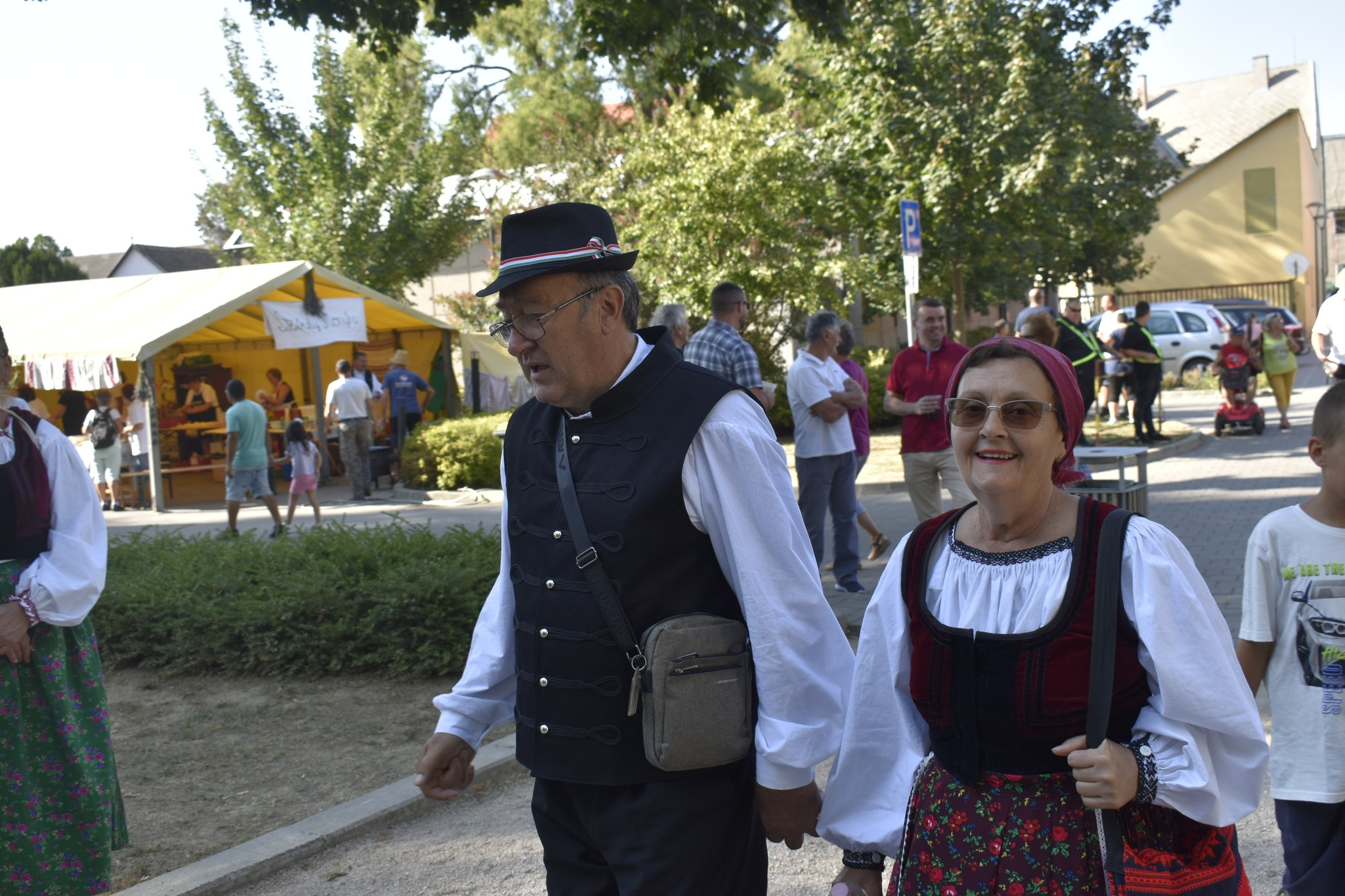
Székelys folk costume

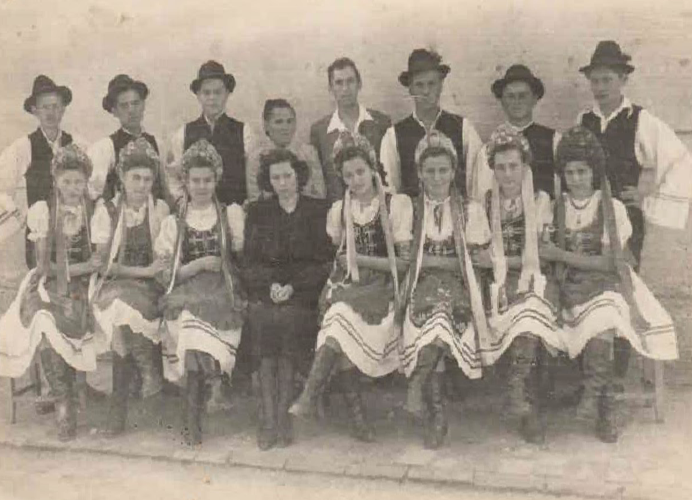
Dance group

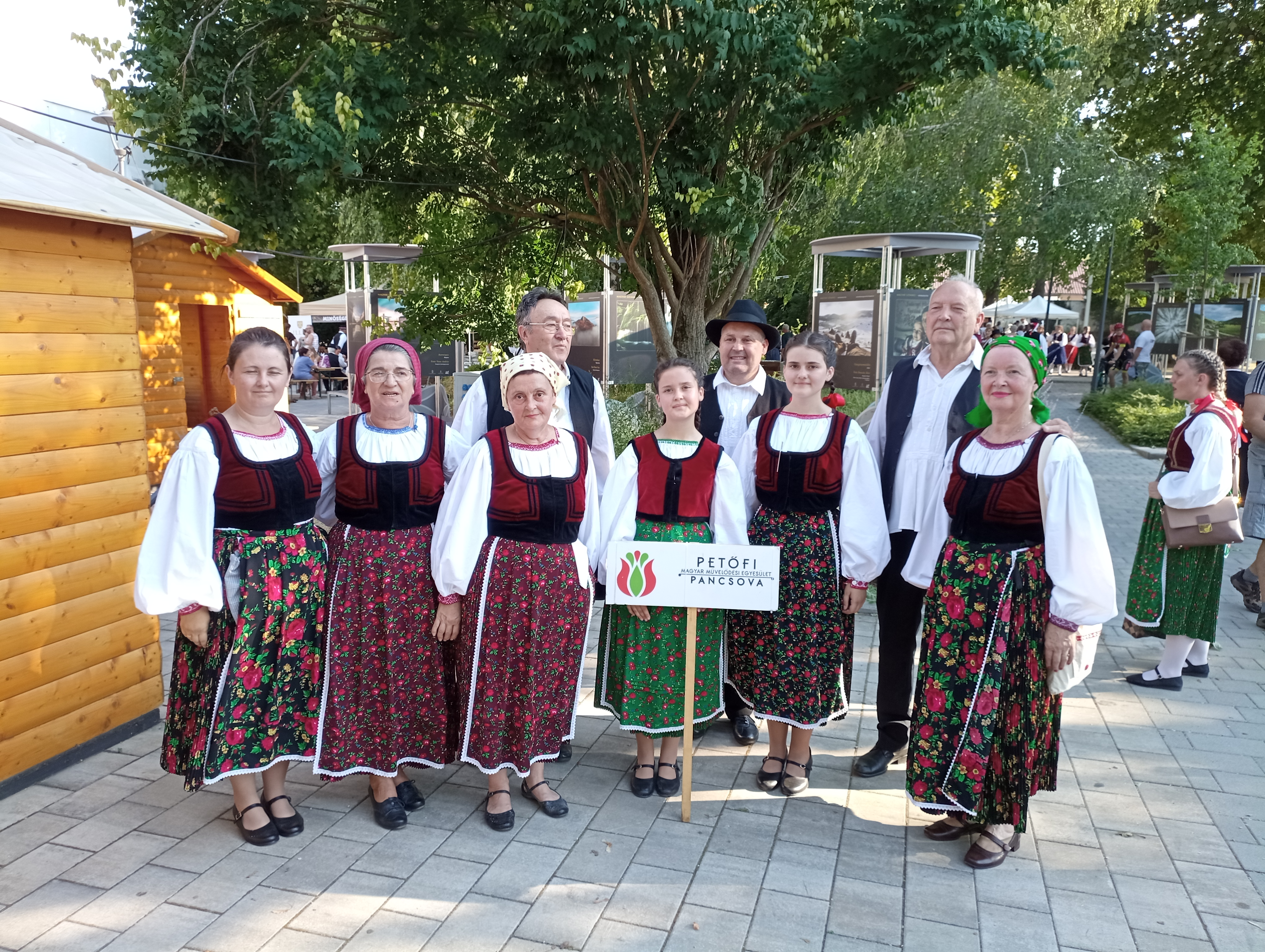
Sociaty members

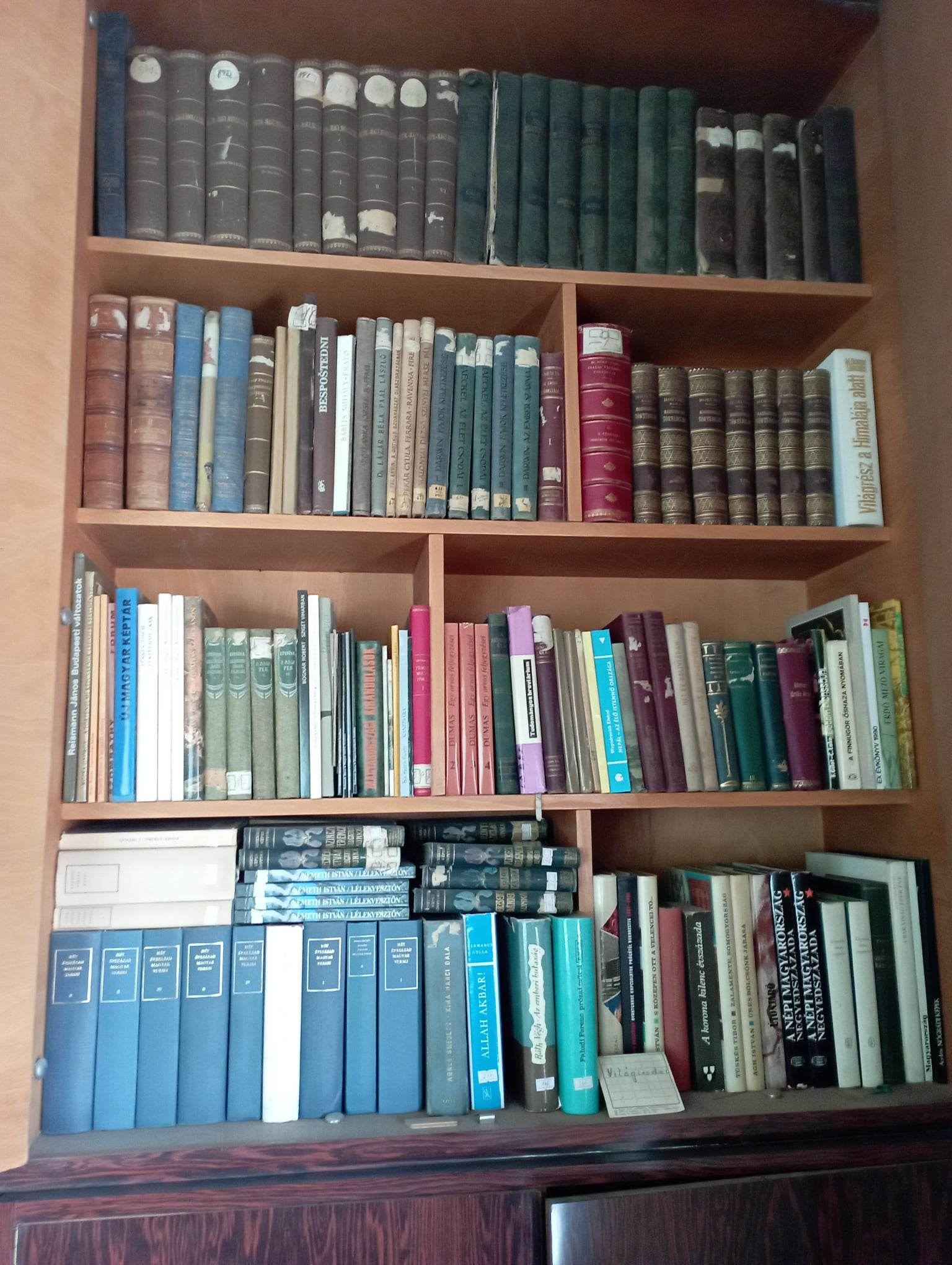
Part of the library

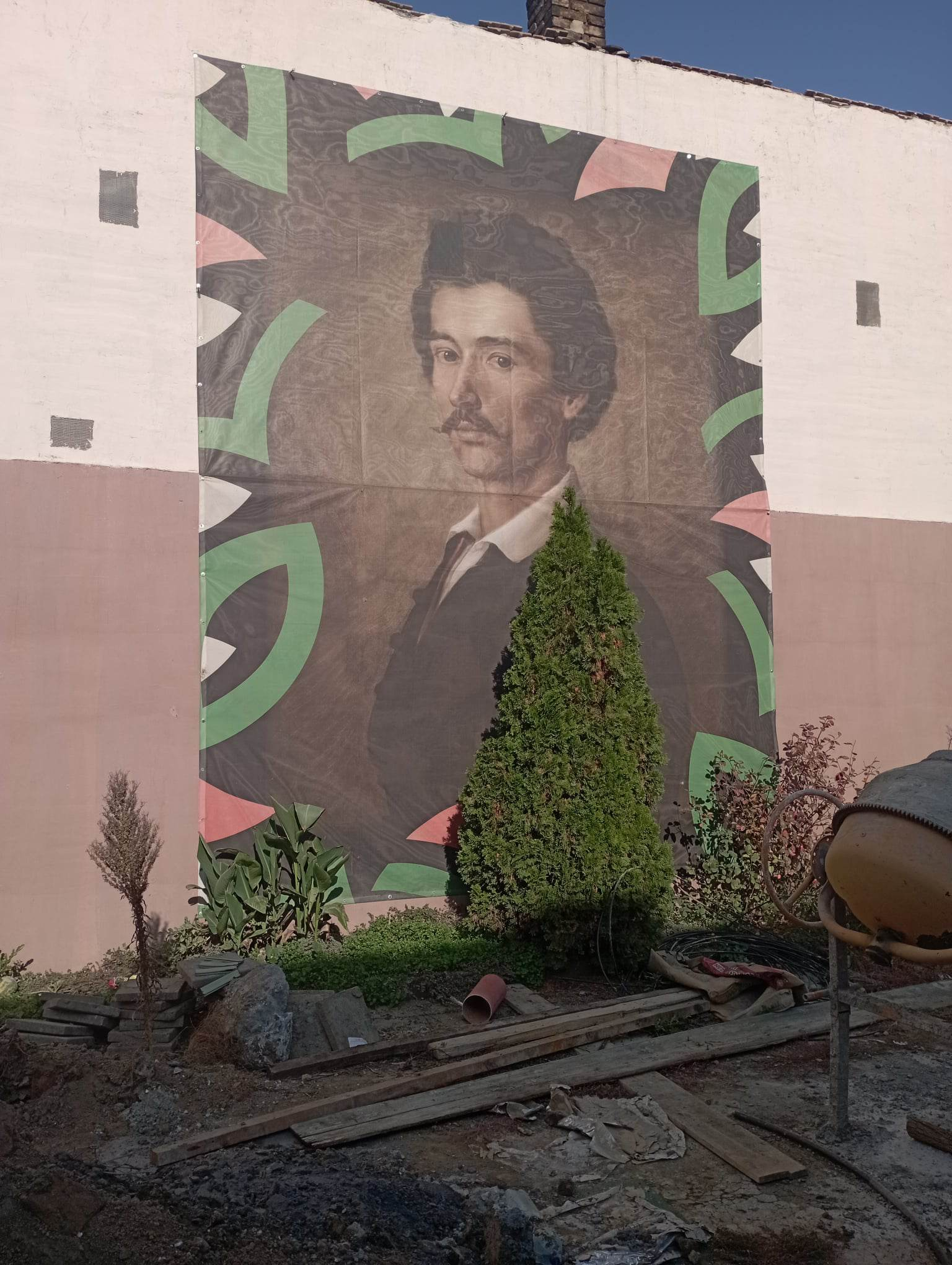
Society's Courtyard

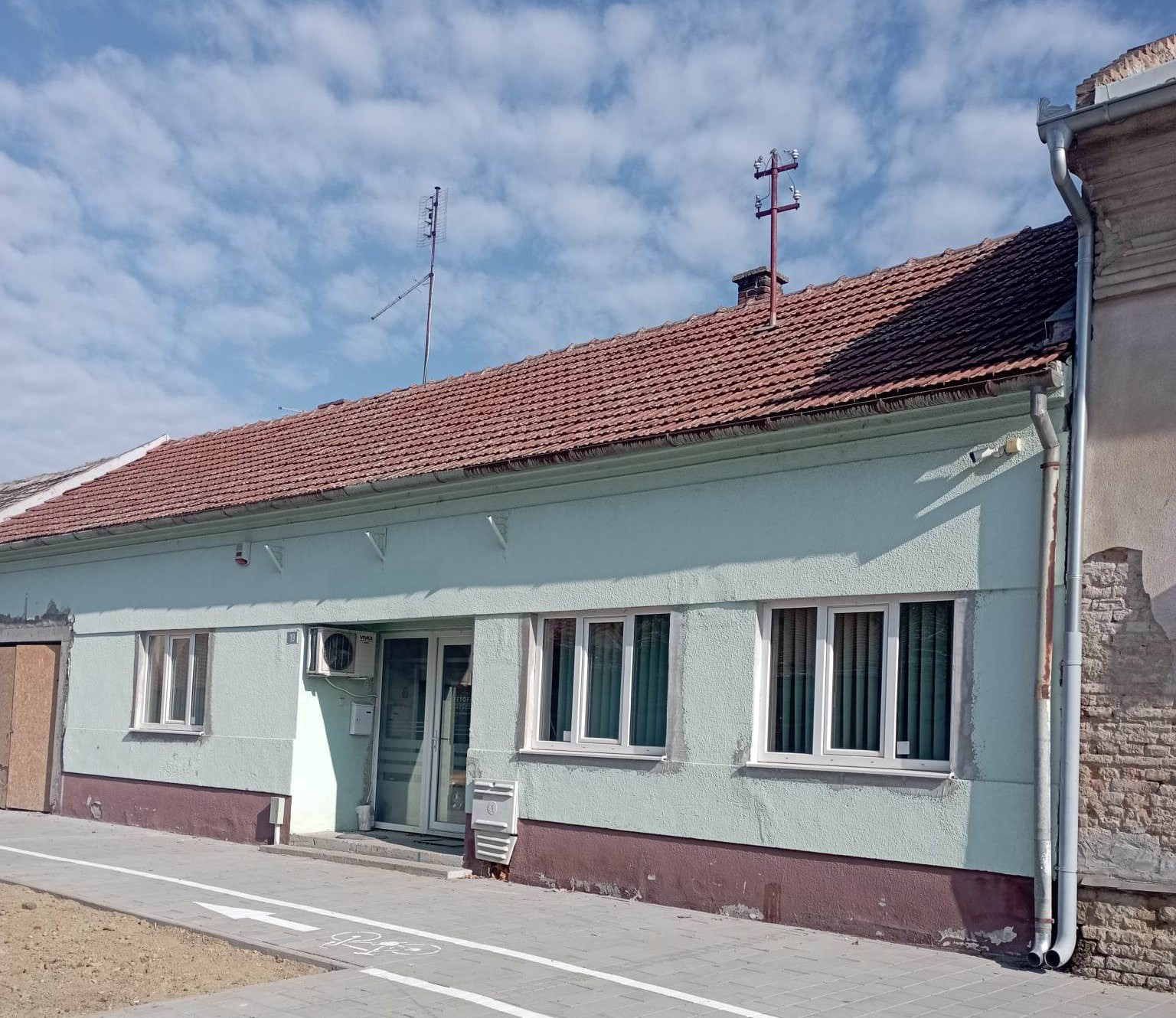
Society's old building

== Literature ==
- Földessy László: 1972 A pancsovai Petőfi Sándor Magyar Közművelődési Egyesület krónikája 1946-1971
- Wigand János: 1896 Pancsovai Emlékkönyv
- Nagy Sívó Zoltán: 2003 A főváros árnyékában
- Farkas Frigyesné Lichtneckert Margit: 1940 Bokréta - a jugoszláviai magyar műkedvelők almanachja 1919-1940
- Nagy László: 1993 Magyarország Európában

== Sources ==
- A pancsovai Petőfi Sándor Magyar Művelődési Egyesület levéltára
- Történelmi Levéltár, Pancsova
- Városi Könyvtár, Pancsova
