= Atanáz Orosz =

Hungarian Greek Catholic hierarch and Eparchial Bishop of Miskolc since March 2015

- Eparchial Bishop of Hungarian Catholic Eparchy of Miskolc
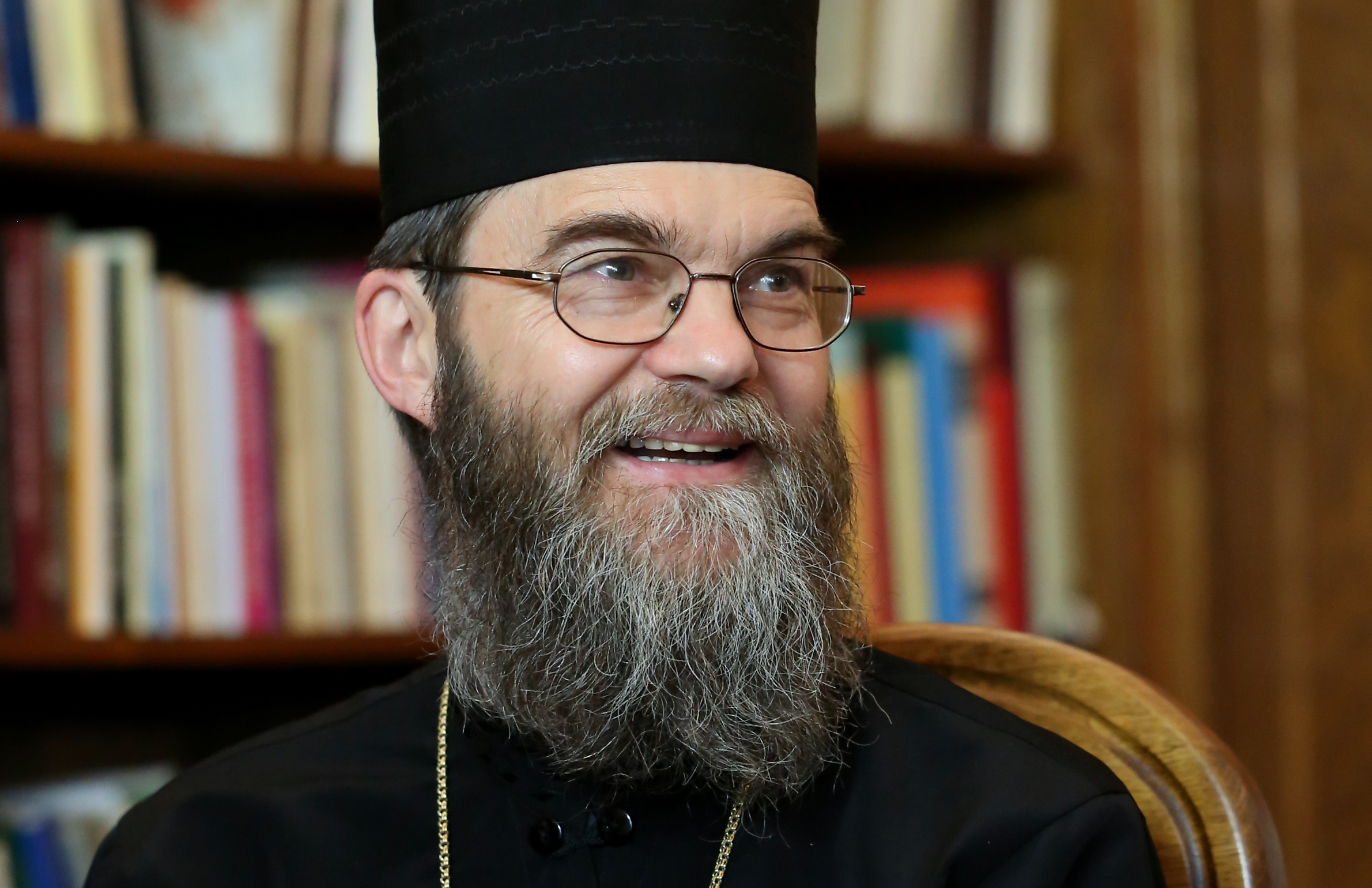
- Church: Hungarian Greek Catholic Church
- Appointed: 5 March 2011 (as Apostolic Exarch); 20 March 2015 (as Eparchial Bishop)
- Predecessor: Péter Fülöp Kocsis
- Successor: Incumbent
- Other posts: Titular Bishop of Panium (2011–2015), Apostolic Administrator of Nyíregyháza (2015)

Orders
- Ordination: 4 August 1985 (Priest)
- Consecration: 21 May 2011 (Bishop) by Cyril Vasiľ

Personal details
- Born: László Orosz; 11 May 1960 (age 66) Nyíregyháza, Hungary

Bishop Atanáz László Orosz (born 11 May 1960 in Nyíregyháza, Hungary) is a Hungarian Greek Catholic hierarch as the Eparchial Bishop of the new elevated Hungarian Catholic Eparchy of Miskolc since 20 March 2015 and was the Titular Bishop of Panium and Apostolic Exarch of Apostolic Exarchate of Miskolc from 5 March 2011 until 20 March 2015. Also he served as the Apostolic Administrator of the new created Hungarian Catholic Eparchy of Nyíregyháza from 20 March 2015 until 31 October 2015.

== Life ==
Bishop Orosz was born in the family of the Greek-Catholic priest and, after graduation of the school education, joined the Theological Faculty of the Pázmány Péter Catholic University. He was ordained as a priest on August 4, 1985 in Budapest, after completed philosophical and theological studies. Orosz continued a superior studies in the Alphonsian Academy in Rome (1985–1987). Also he was a prefect, and after – rector of the Major Theological Seminary in Nyíregyháza and experienced monastic life in the Benedictine Chevetogne Abbey. In 1999, together with his friend Péter Fülöp Kocsis, they founded a Hungarian Greek-Catholic monastery in Dámóc.

On March 5, 2011, he was appointed by the Pope Benedict XVI as an Apostolic Exarch of the Apostolic Exarchate of Miskolc and Titular Bishop of Panium. On May 21, 2011, he was consecrated as bishop by Archbishop Cyril Vasiľ and other hierarchs of the Eastern Catholic Churches.

Catholic Church titles
Preceded by Piotr Gołębiowski	Titular Bishop of Panium; 2011–2015	Succeeded by Petro Loza
Preceded by Péter Fülöp Kocsis	Apostolic Exarch of Miskolc; 2011–2015	Succeeded by himself as Eparchial Bishop
Preceded by himself as Apostolic Exarch	Eparchial Bishop of Miskolc; 2015–present	Succeeded by Incumbent
New title	Apostolic Administrator of Nyíregyháza; 2015	Succeeded by Ábel Szocska (as Apostolic Administrator)
