= Vynohradiv =

City in Zakarpattia Oblast, Ukraine

Vynohradiv Виноградів
- City
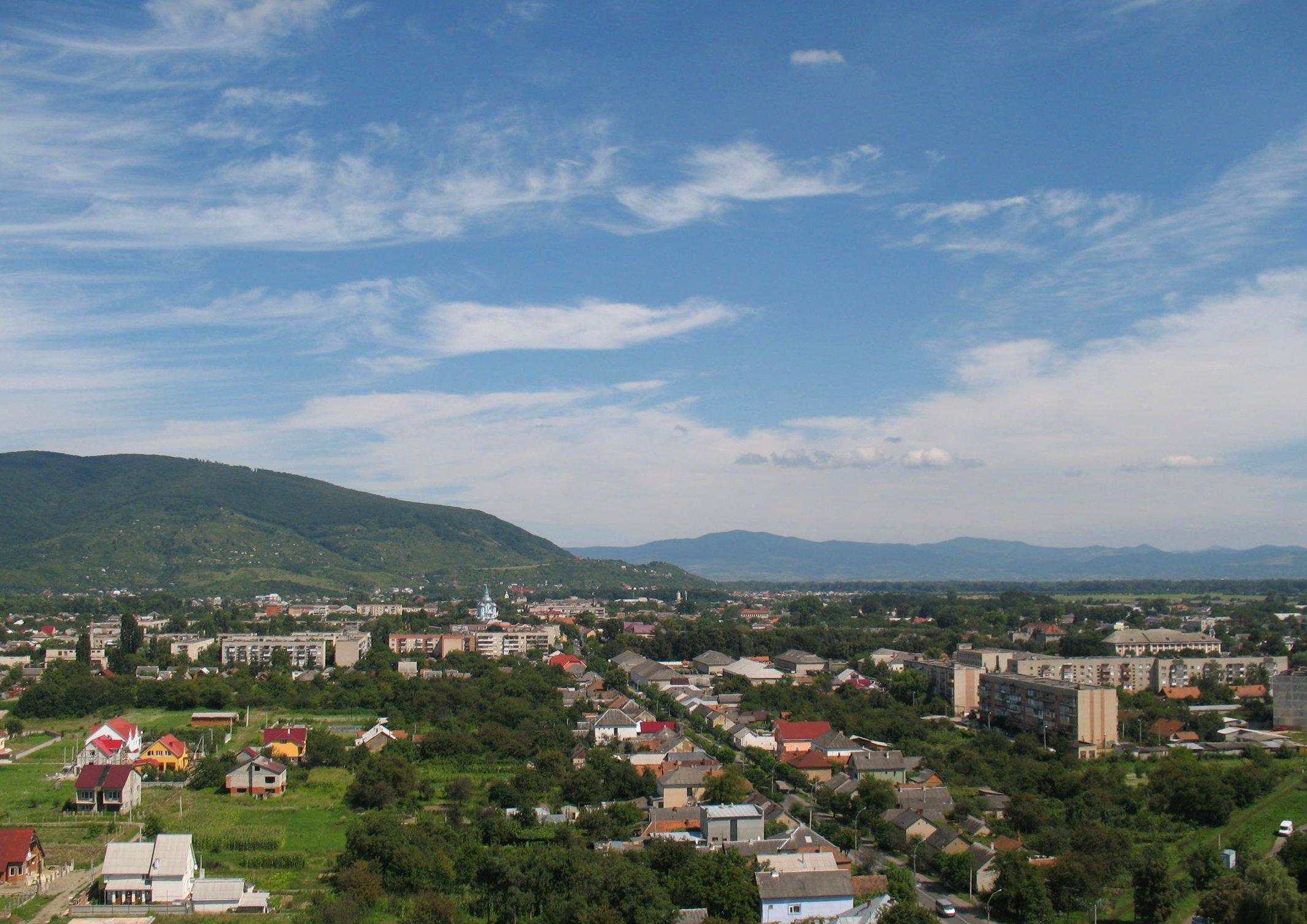
- Central Vynohradiv looking towards Black Mountain

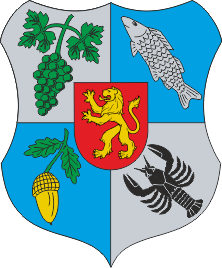
- Coat of arms
- Interactive map of Vynohradiv
- Map of Zakarpattia Oblast with Vynohradiv. Vynohradiv (Ukraine)
- Coordinates: 48°08′59″N 23°01′30″E
- Country: Ukraine
- Oblast: Zakarpattia Oblast
- Raion: Berehove Raion
- Hromada: Vynohradiv urban hromada
- Founded: 1262 as Sevliush
- Incorporated: 1946

Government
  - Mayor: Stepan Bochkaj

Area
  - Total: 32.09 km^{2} (12.39 sq mi)
- Elevation: 134 m (440 ft)

Population (2022)
  - Total: 25,317
  - Density: 788.9/km^{2} (2,043/sq mi)
- Time zone: UTC+1 (CET)
  - Summer (DST): UTC+2 (CEST)
- Postal code: 90300 — 305
- Area code: +380-3143
- Climate: Cfb
- Website: www.rada.vynogradiv.com.ua

Vynohradiv (Ukrainian: Виноградів, IPA: [wɪnoˈɦrɑd⁽ʲ⁾iu̯]; Hungarian: Nagyszőlős; Romanian: Seleușu Mare; Slovak: Vinohradov) is a city in western Ukraine, in Zakarpattia Oblast. Since 2020 it has been incorporated into Berehove Raion. Population: 25,317 (2022 estimate).

== Names ==
There are multiple alternative names used for this city due to its location and history: Hungarian: Nagyszőlős, Romanian: Seleușu Mare, Rusyn: Cивлюш (Syvlyush), Ukrainian: Cевлюш (Sevlyush), Russian: Виноградов (Vinogradov), Belarusian: Вінаградаў (Vinahradaŭ), Yiddish: סעליש (Seylesh, Selish), Slovak: Vinohradov (Veľká Sevljuš during Czechoslovak rule), German: Wynohradiw, Polish: Wynohradiw (hist. Sewlusz).

== Geography ==
=== Location ===
The city lies at the foothills of Carpathian Mountains near the river Tisza on the border with Romania. It is 35 kilometres (22 mi) from Berehove.

== History ==
It was first mentioned in 1262 by the name Zceuleus. Its Hungarian name, Nagyszőlős ("Great Vineyard"), stems from the area being an important wine district. The city was called Sevlush (the Rusyn transliteration of the Hungarian word szőlős, meaning vineyard).

The town was one of the oldest in Ugocsa county, and was inhabited by winemakers of the royal court. In 1329, Hungarian King Charles Robert granted privileges to the town, which became the seat of the Comitatus (the city held this rank until the Treaty of Trianon was signed in 1920).

In 1717, most of the citizens of the town were killed by an invading Tatar horde. By 1880, the population was about 4,400 (with 500 native Romanians). In 1881 a secondary school was opened.

In 1910 it had a population of 7,811 (5,943 or 76% Hungarians, 1,266 or 16% Ruthenians (Rusyns) and 540 or 7% Germans). The religious make-up was 3,311 Greek Catholics (42.5%), 2,237 Jews (28.6%) and 1,124 Calvinists (14.4%). By 1930 the city' population had grown to 11,000 inhabitants.

This city had a Jewish ghetto in 1944. At its height from May to June 1944, most of the Jews of this section of northern Transylvania were deported to the Auschwitz concentration camp to be gassed shortly after arrival. Jews from the area typically spent about two weeks in the ghetto before being deported. Conditions were extremely cramped with many families housed in a single room, a deliberate arrangement meant to cause suffering and disease.

In 1944, Carpathian Ruthenia was occupied by Soviet Union and was formally incorporated into Ukrainian SSR in 1946. The city name became Vinogradovo (Russian), Vynohradiv (Ukrainian), or Vynohradovo (Rusyn). All mean "Grape Town."

A local newspaper is published here since December 1945.

Under the Soviet rule the city was the center of Vynohradiv Raion. The city had a polytechnical school. Citrus fruit and tea were introduced into local agriculture.

== Demographics ==
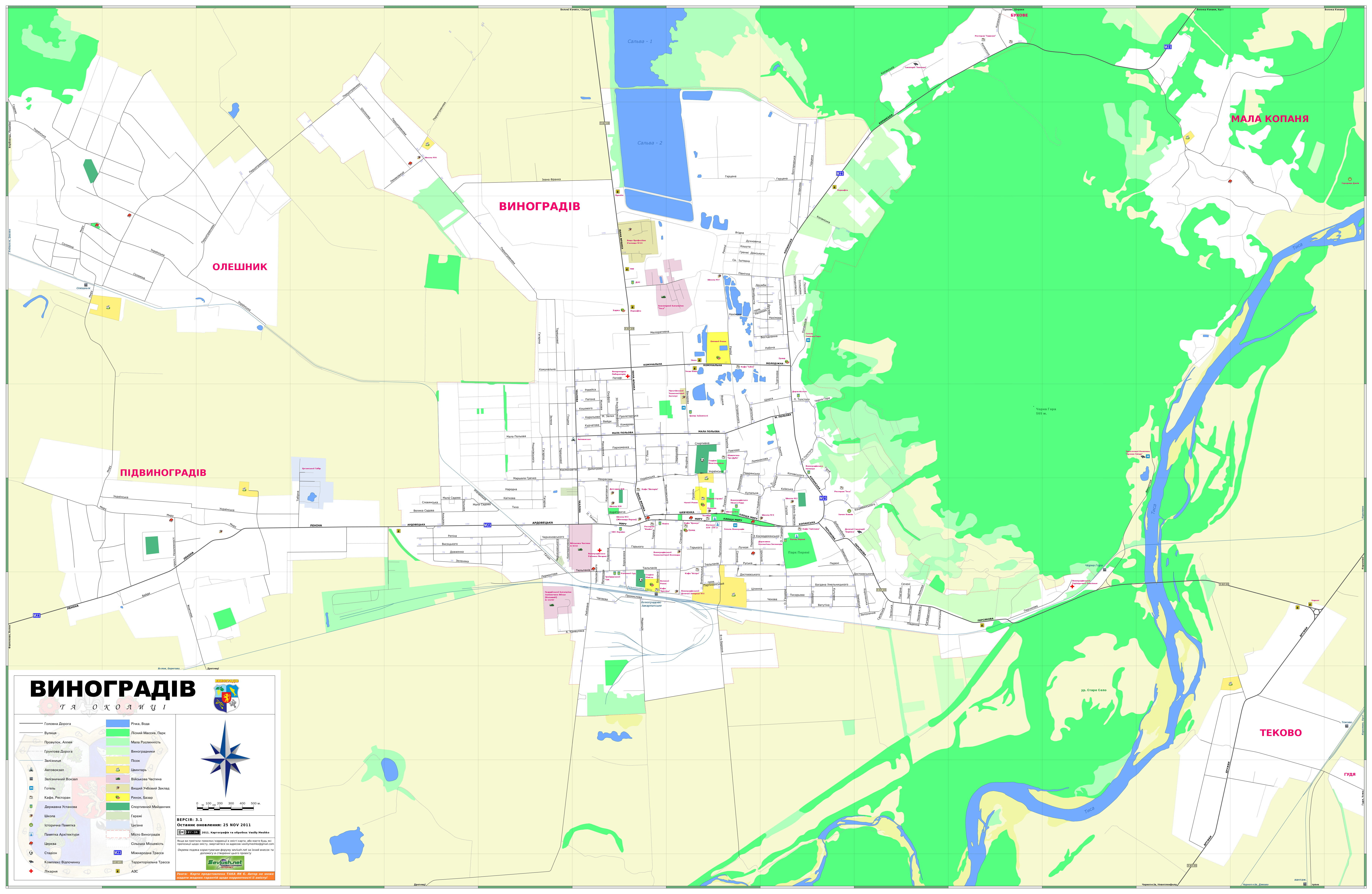
Street map of Vynohradiv and surrounding area (in Ukrainian).

According to the 2001 census, the population included:

- Ukrainians (82.13%)
- Hungarians (13.54%)
- Russians (3.82%)
- Roma (0.6%)

== Tourist sights ==
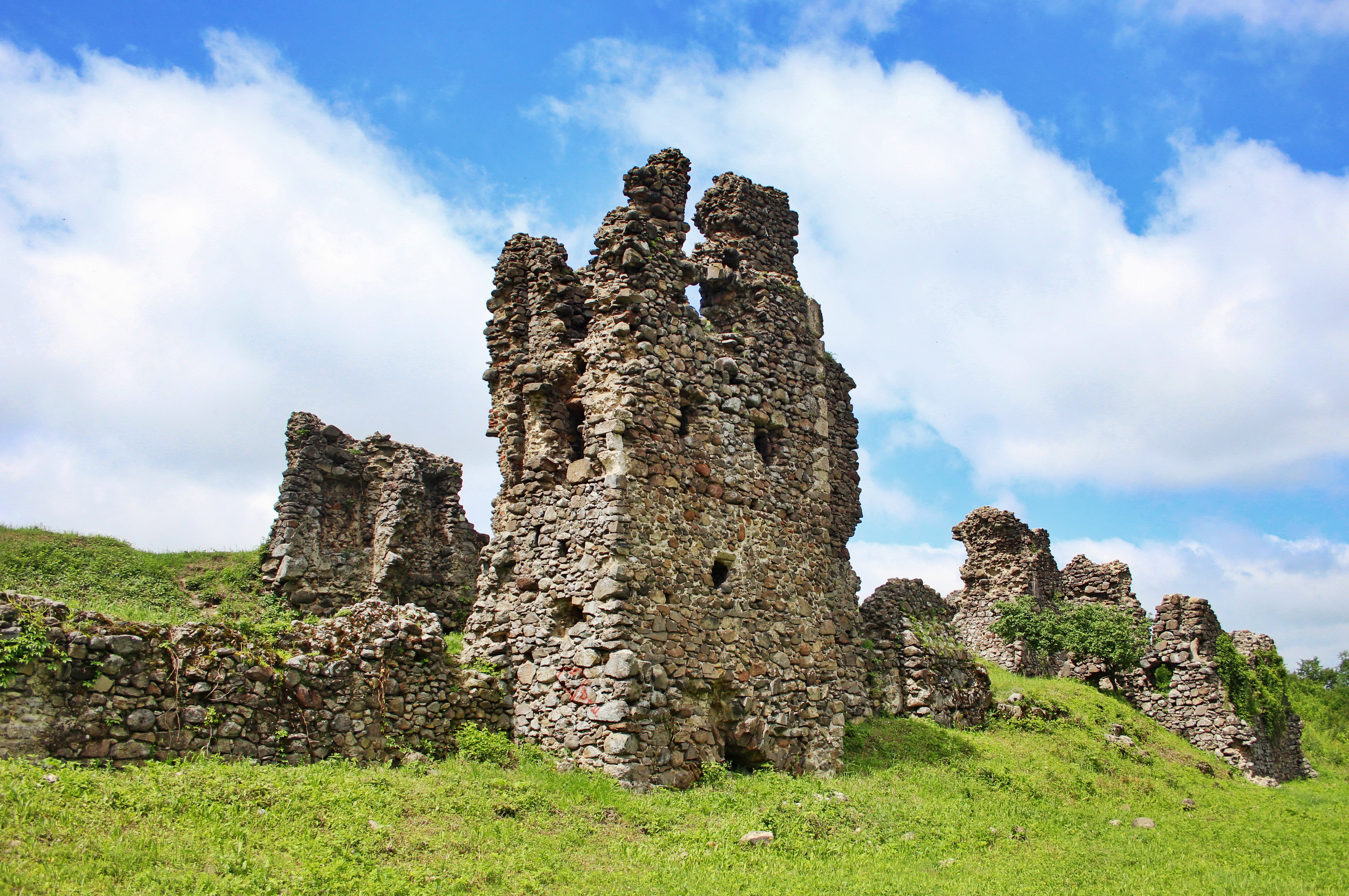
Ugocsa Castle

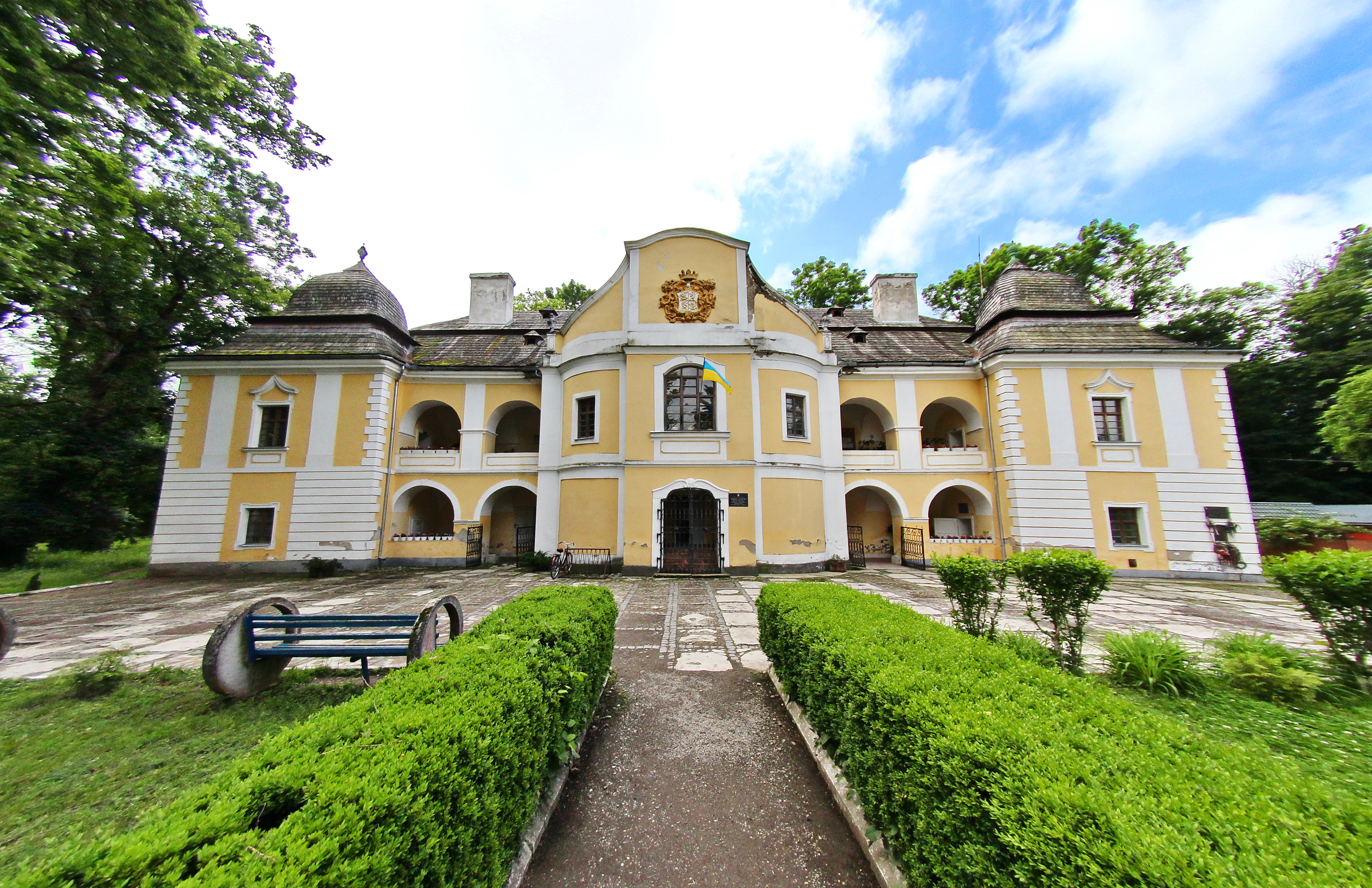
Perényi Castle

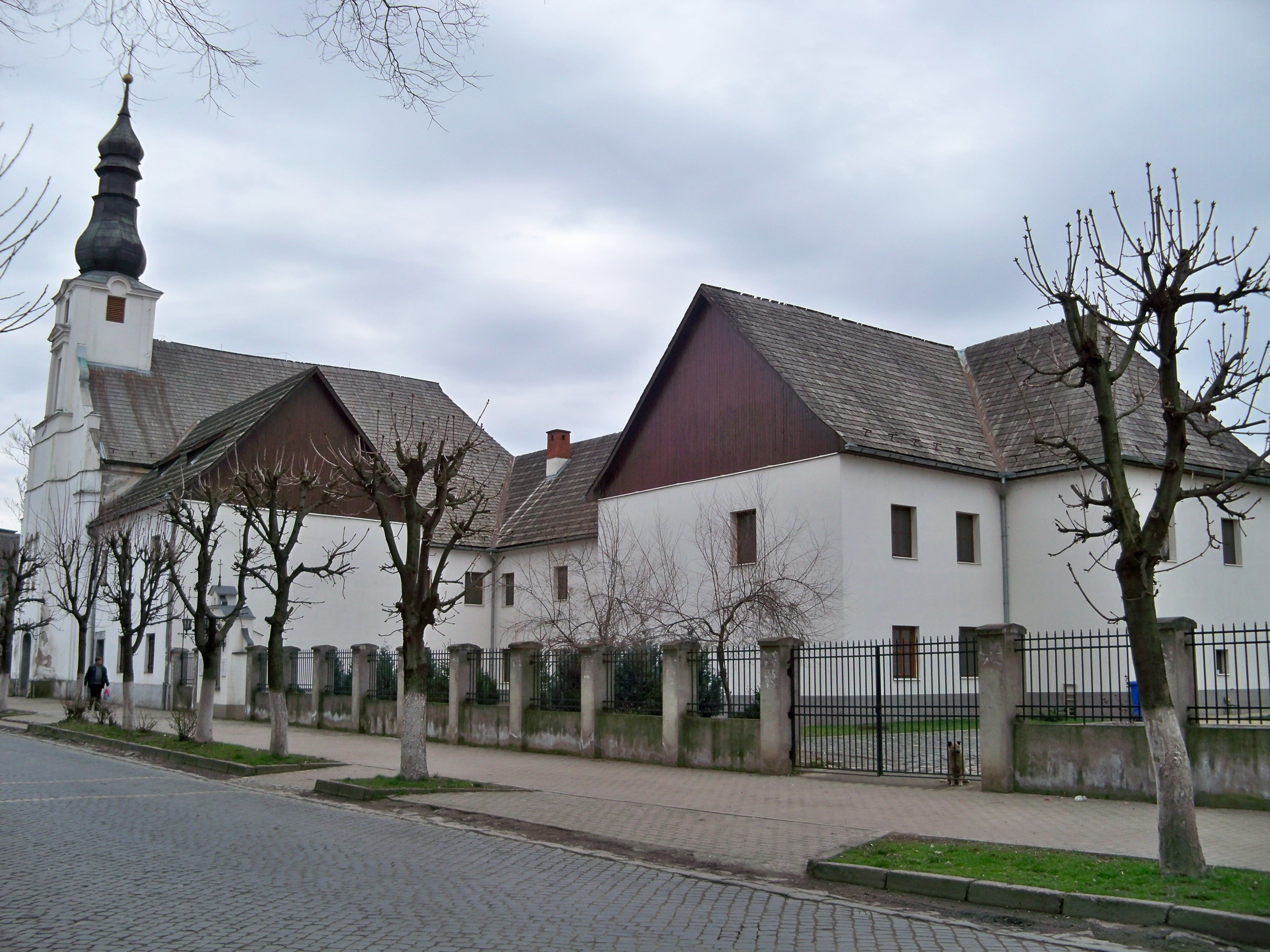
Franciscan church and monastery

- Ugocsa Castle "Kankó" (ruins; 13th century). It was first mentioned in 1308. In 1315 King Charles Robert attacked and destroyed it. In the 15th century the area was given to monks of the Franciscan order, they built a monastery there, which was inhabited until 1558. There is a small 14th century chapel south of the ruins.
- Perényi Castle. It was built by the Perényi noble family from 1399, later rebuilt in baroque style into a mansion.
- Franciscan church and monastery (built in 1744, rebuilt in 1889).
- Our Lady's Church (13th century, rebuilt in the 15th century in Gothic style, restored in the early 20th century. Its furniture was destroyed after 1945. The Church got it back in 1989.
- Franciscan monastery (founded in the 15th century). In 1556 local Protestants attacked the monastery, killed the monks and threw the body of St. John Capistrano into a well. The Perényi family invited monks of the order to the town again, but the monastery burnt down in 1747. Its current building was erected in 1889.
- Protestant church (Neoclassical, 1828).
- Old county hall (now the building of the Zsigmond Perényi Secondary School) and statue of Perényi (1906).

== Notable people ==
In alphabetical order:

- Béla Bartók (1881-1945), composer.
- Ethella Chupryk (1964-2019), pianist and assistant professor of piano at the Mykola Lysenko National Music Academy.
- József Csorba (1789-1858), doctor and physicist.
- Gábor Döbrentei (1785-1851), philologist and antiquarian.
- Mykhaylo Koman (1928-2015), footballer and coach of Dynamo Kyiv.
- János Majos, Kuruc captain, was born here.
- Edvin Marton (born 1974), composer and violinist.
- Endre Nagy (1877-1938), writer and stage director.
- Eleanor Perenyi (1918-2009), American author.
- Imre Révész (1859-1945), painter.
- Emerich Roth (1924-2022), Holocaust survivor and writer.
- Ábel Szocska (born 1972), first Eparchial Bishop of the Hungarian Catholic Eparchy of Nyíregyháza.

== Economy ==
Vynohradiv is a centre of food production and light industry. A brick and tile factory operated in the city during Soviet times. Gardening and viticulture are practced in the surrounding areas. One of the biggest employers in modern Vynohradiv is Gentherm.

== International relations ==
=== Twin towns — Sister cities ===
Vynohradiv is twinned with:

- Nyírbátor in Hungary
- Fehérgyarmat in Hungary
- Dynów in Poland
- Vranov nad Topľou in Slovakia
- Celadas in Spain
