= József Hertelendy (1833–1891) =

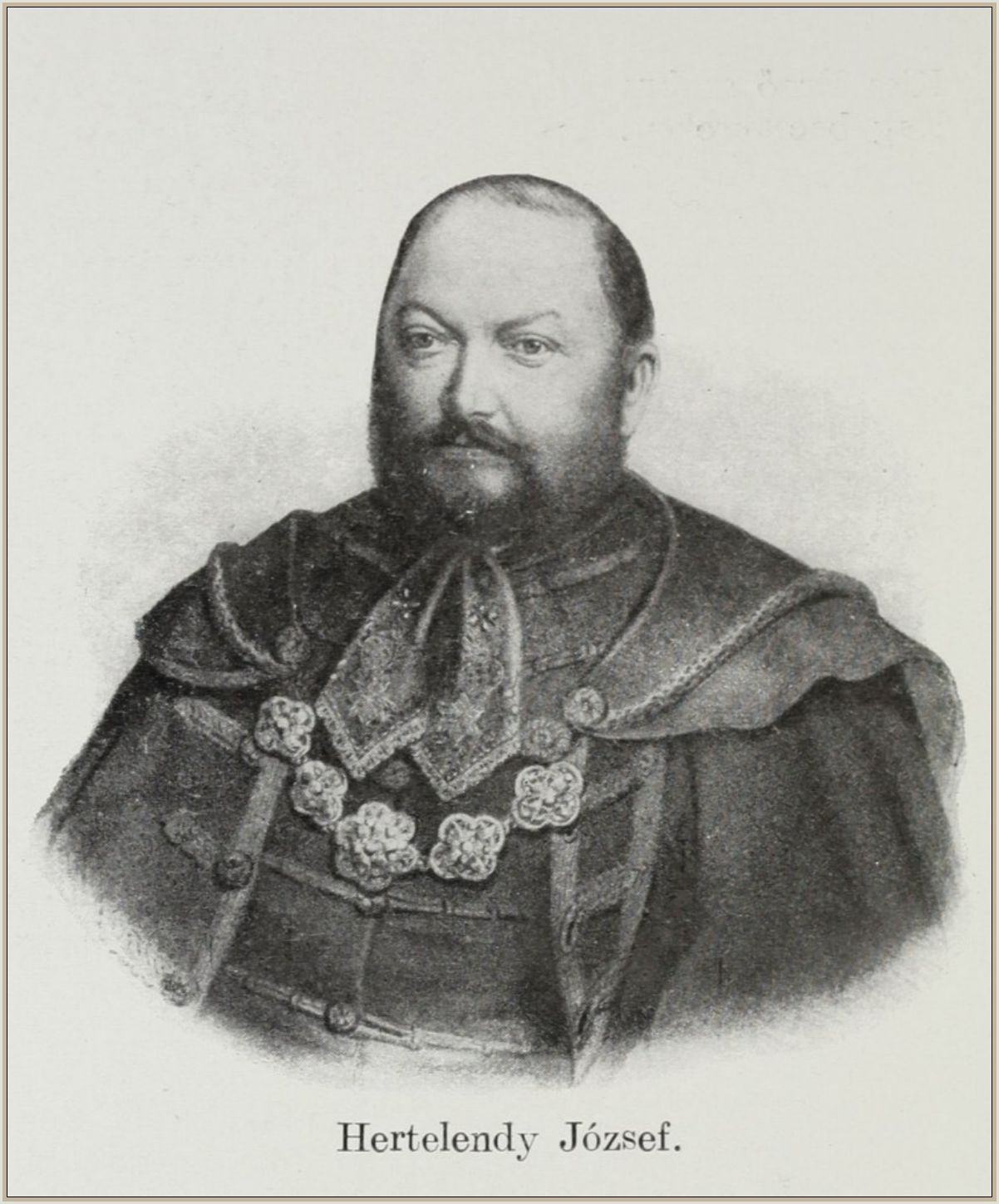
- Hertelendy József 1912
- Born: 23 May 1833; Bocsár, Torontál, Kingdom of Hungary
- Died: 31 August 1891 (aged 58); Marilla (Marillafürdő)
- Occupation: Government official

József Hertelendy (23 May 1833 – 31 August 1891) was a politician, Lord-lieutenant of Torontál in Hungarian Kingdom, Member of the House of Lords. and Member of the Főrendház; he received Order of Saint Stephen of Hungary.

== Biography ==
Born in Bocsár (Torontál County) on May 23, 1833, he died in Marillafürdő on August 31, 1891. After studying law in Budapest, he attended the Hungarian Academy of Economics in Óvár and then in Hohenheim, 1861. He was elected as a bailiff of Nagy-Kikinda, but not wanting to serve on a provisional basis, he resigned in November of the same year together with the entire staff. In 1874, he was appointed deputy chief of Torontál county. From 1876 to 1877, at the time of the flood in the Southern Region of Hungary, he was a full-power government commissioner. In 1878, he became a government commissioner of the Versecz regulatory company. He was one of the first appointed members of the Főrendiház. The village of Hertelendy was named after him.

His thorough education and extensive knowledge soon became public knowledge, which is why he was elected president of the Upper Torontal Price Relief Society in 1857. He lived in Bochar and was not only involved in its management, but also managed the affairs of the Price Relief Society with excellent expertise and tact. When the political conditions changed in 1860, he also entered the field of action and began to appear in political life. After just a few months, he became so well known due to his excellent talent and tact seen in all areas that on February 4, 1861, he was elected with great enthusiasm as the serf judge of Nagykikinda district. He held this office until the provisional period occurred, when he resigned together with the constitutional officers of the county. The provisional government did everything to win him over, and even wanted to keep him in the public service so much that, among other promising promises, he was also offered the position of first lieutenant, which he refused.

During his presidency, in 1882, Székelys of Bukovina were invited back to their homeland and it was possible to establish two premises in the Pančevo district through resettlement. One of them was named Hertelendyfalva in honor of József on July 21, 1883. In 1885, his majesty appointed him as a hereditary member of the Grand Order. Committee member János Dániel expressed his great joy and love for the county community at the autumn general assembly. In 1887, the government entrusted József with the redemption and arrangement of the so-called Überland lands - in the capacity of government commissioner.

He held the dignity of archbishop for nearly eighteen years, until the end of his life. Death ended his active life on August 31, 1891, in the wild Marillat Valley.
