= Dámóc =

- Village
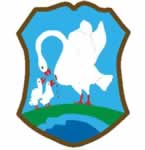
- Seal

- Location within Hungary
- Coordinates: 48°22′38.6″N 22°2′24.65″E
- Country: Hungary
- Regions: Northern Hungary
- County: Borsod-Abaúj-Zemplén County

Area
  - Total: 15.99 km^{2} (6.17 sq mi)

Population (2008)
  - Total: 407
- Time zone: UTC+1 (CET)
  - Summer (DST): UTC+2 (CEST)

Dámóc is a village in Borsod-Abaúj-Zemplén County in northeastern Hungary. As of 2008 it had a population of 407. The town is home to a Hungarian Greek Catholic Church, founded in 1735, and built between 1816 and 1832 in Baroque Revival style.
