= Emerich Roth =

Slovak-born Swedish author (1924–2022)

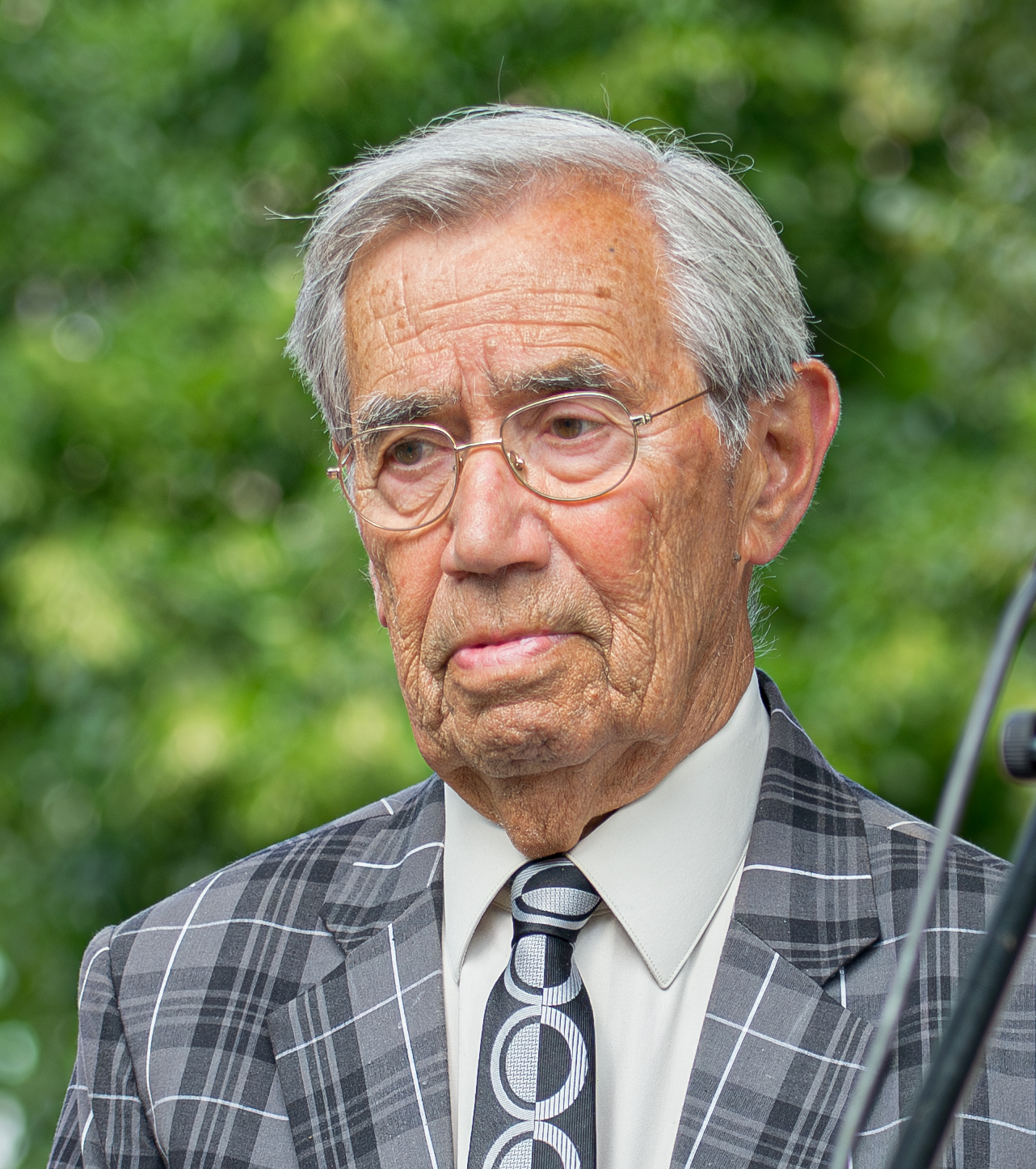
- Roth in 2017
- Born: 28 August 1924; Veľká Sevljuš, Czechoslovakia
- Died: 22 January 2022 (aged 97); Stockholm, Sweden
- Occupations: Author, social worker

Emerich Roth (28 August 1924 – 22 January 2022) was a Slovak-born Swedish Holocaust survivor, author, lecturer and social worker who worked with spreading information about racism, violence, and Nazi atrocities.

== Biography ==
Roth was born in Veľká Sevljuš in Czechoslovakia (now Vynohradiv in Ukraine) and grew up in Czechoslovakia with four younger sisters in a city of 15,000 inhabitants. When the Nazis arrived in the city, the city's 3,000 Jews were first forced to move to a makeshift ghetto, before the order came to move to "work for a shorter time in another country". After a several-day long train transport in overcrowded livestock carts without water and food, the train arrived at Auschwitz-Birkenau.

Roth's mother and two of his little sisters Magdalena, 12, and Judit, 10, were immediately brought to the gas chambers, while his father, his sisters Edit, 17, and Elisabeth, 15, and Emerich himself were taken to labor camps. His father was murdered during one of the death marches at the end of the war, and his sister Edit died in another camp.

He was an inmate in five different concentration camps, and only he and his sister Elisabeth survived. After the war, Emerich was in bad shape and was 1.75 meters tall and weighed only 34 kilograms. He was in the hospital and received a letter from someone with the same last name, which was his cousin. The letter stated that his sister had survived and was in Sweden.

Roth came to Sweden in December 1950 and trained and worked for 30 years as a social worker. During these years he chose not to tell about his experiences, but was greatly influenced by a Nazi demonstration in Stockholm in 1992.

From 1993, he visited at least 1,600 schools around Sweden with the aim of countering racism. He was one of the founders of the Holocaust Survivor Association. He founded the nonprofit Emerich Foundation in 1994, which aims to encourage young people to do "activities that counter violence and xenophobia and pave the way for a pleasant and humane school environment".

He published several books on the theme of violence and racism, including Emerich är mitt namn: Hatet, förnedringen, kärleken (Emerich's My Name: Hate, Humiliation, Love). He also starred in many video-recorded documentaries and educational films.

Roth died on 22 January 2022, at the age of 97.

== Awards ==
He has received several rewards for his work on informing about racism and abuse.

- H. M. The King's Medal 8th size in blue ribbon (1998)
- Stockholm City's Nelson Mandela award (2008)
- Karin and Ernst August Bångs commemorative award (1997)
- Svenska Hjältars pris (2012)
- Raoul Wallenberg award (2015)
- Olof Palme Prize (2017)
- Sokratespriset (2019) (shared with Hédi Fried)
