= Vojlovica, Pančevo =

Vojlovica Војловица Hertelendyfalva (Hungarian)
- Suburb of Pančevo (former village)
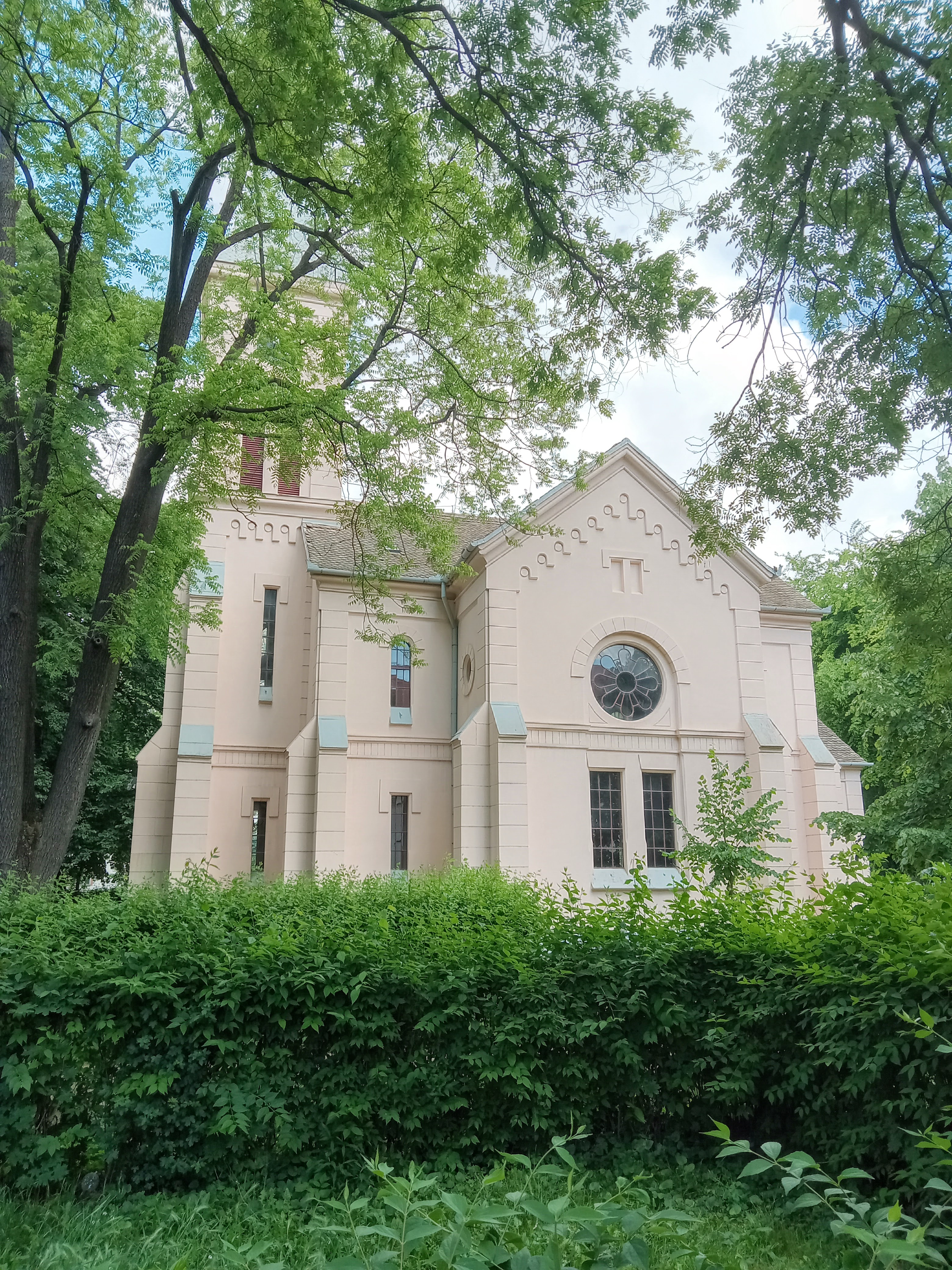
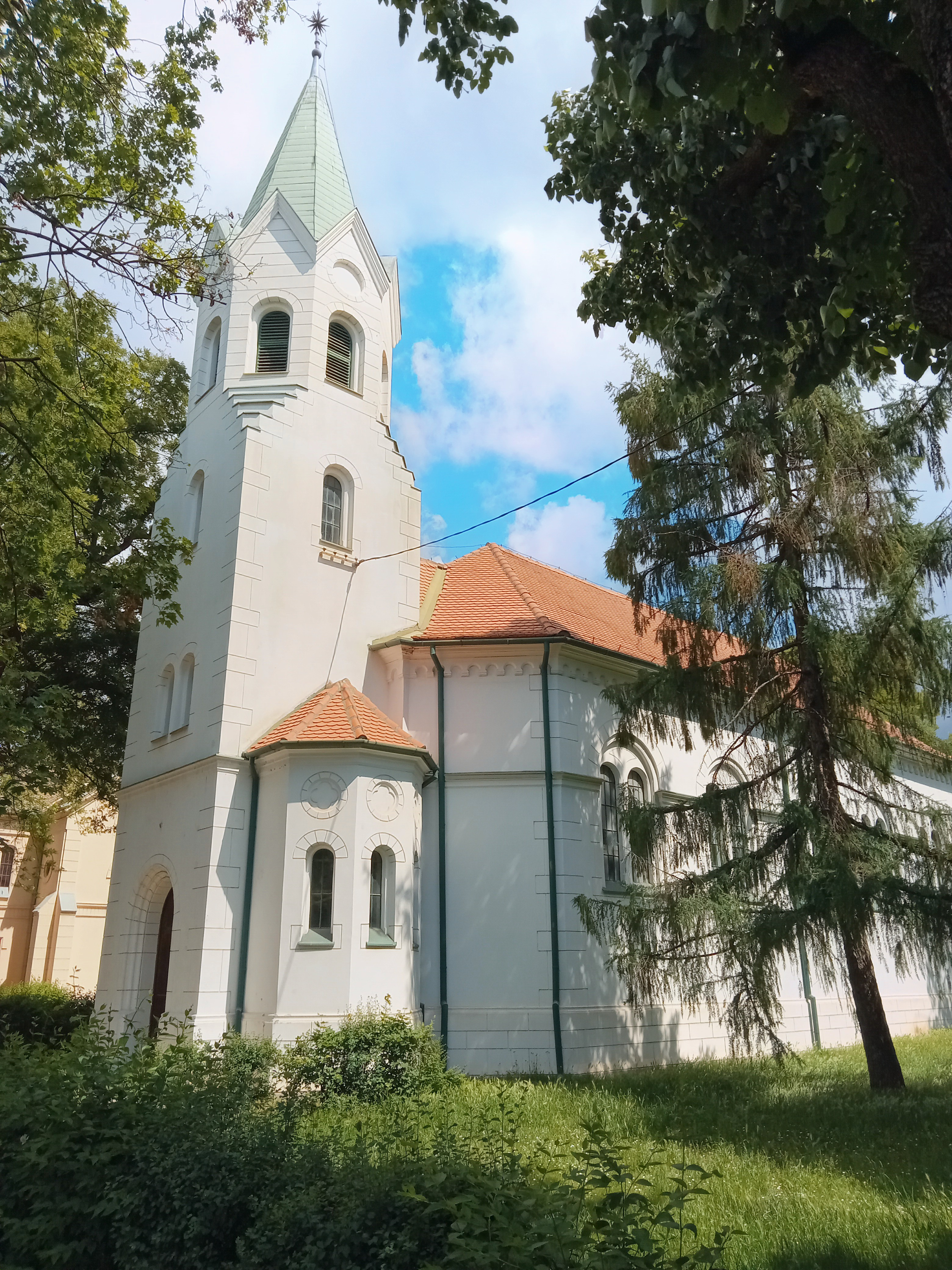
- Slovak Evangelical (Lutheran) and Reformed (Calvinist) Church The Calvinist church

- Location within Serbia
- Coordinates: 44.848532°N 20.672677°E
- Country: Serbia
- Province: Vojvodina

Population (2019)
  - Total: c.8500
- Time zone: UTC+1 (CET)
  - Summer (DST): UTC+2 (CEST)

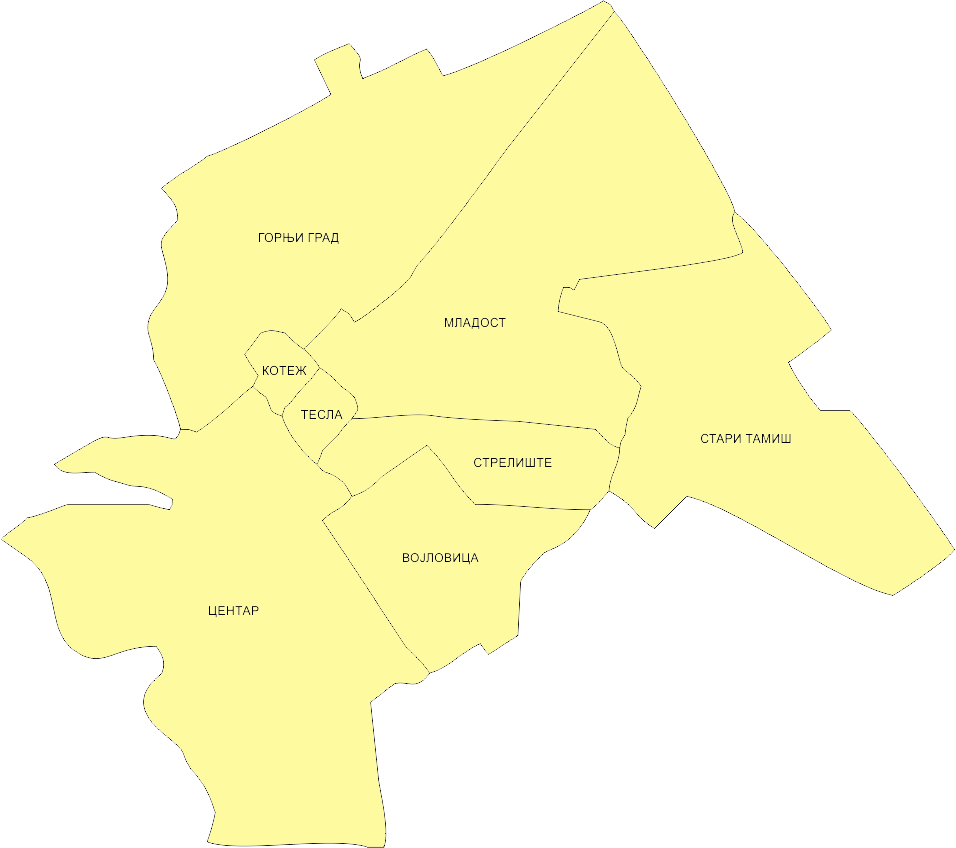
Map of urban local communities of Pančevo

Vojlovica (Serbian Cyrillic: Војловица) is a neighborhood of the city of Pančevo, Serbia. Formerly, it was a separate village that was joined with Pančevo in the second half of the 20th century. Vojlovica's centre is located 3.32 km (2.06 mi) away from Pančevo's centre. The geographical latitude of the settlement is 44° 50' 41.48" North, while the longitude is 20° 40' 21.69" East.

== Name ==
In Serbian the neighborhood is known as Vojlovica or Војловица, in Hungarian as Hertelendyfalva, and in German as Wojlowitz.

Vojlovica was founded on 21 July 1883 and was named Hertelendyfalva in Hungarian, after Hertelendy József. Today's name exists from 1922, and the village got it after the nearby Orthodox monastery of Vojlovica (which was founded in 1404). In the time of the village foundation, there was only one forest which belonged to the monastery.

== History ==
Bronze Age graves of south Russian steppe nomads was found in the village.

Between 1856 and 1869, the Habsburg monarchy started a project of colonization of an uninhabited area of 154,790 acres (626.4 km^{2}) of land near the Danube River. That area reaches across the three municipalities: the municipality of Titel, the municipality of Pančevo and the municipality of Kovin. The area was known under the name of Marianfeld / Máriaföld.

Seven villages were founded in the area. In Titel and Pančevo, four villages were founded: Königsdorf, Gisellaheim, Eisemhaim and Rudolfsgnad. In Pančevo and Kovin, three villages were founded: Marienfeld (Vojlovica), Ivanovo and Đurđevo. The total number of settlers for this project was 8,638. The settlers were of German, Hungarian, Slovak and Bulgarian origin.

A problem started after a large flood of the river Danube in 1869, and continued floods in 1870, 1871 and 1876, when the flood reached its peak and destroyed all of the villages. The village's population abandoned their habitats and moved to safer places. In 1883, the population of Marienfeld, jointly with 200 Székely families from Andrásfalva (Székelys of Bukovina), moved to the location, on that time known under the name Vojlovica Forest, between Pančevo and Starčevo. The new village was founded under name Hertelendyfalva.

The new founded village accommodated the population which contained three different nationalities: Hungarians, Slovaks and Germans. The village had three streets, each nationality got one. In the beginning, the population survived by working on river dam during the summer and in the forest in the winter. During the following years when they got more agricultural land, the population started to sell their farm products in the town, and became one of the main income factors.

On 21 September 1902, a Reformed church was erected, where Tomka Károly became the first priest. In this newly founded church, all treasured documents and data (which had been brought from Andrasfalva in 1883) are kept.

== Ethnic groups and religion ==
In the 1971 census, the last census before settlement was united with Pančevo, population of Vojlovica was mixed with a Hungarian plurality. Today, population of Vojlovica is about 8,500, with a mix of Serbs, Hungarians and Slovaks.

The number and proportions of the ethnic population of the village between 1880 and 1921:

Nationality / year	1880	1910	1921
Hungarians	2 (0.55%)	1,226 (41.99%)	1,396 (44.53%)
South Slavs	—	16 (0.55%)	26 (0.83%)
German	67 (18.56%)	684 (23.42%)	723 (23.06%)
Others^{1}	292 (80.89%)	994 (34.04%)	990 (31.58%)
Total	361 (100.00%)	2,920 (100.00%)	3,135 (100.00%)

Confessional number of population and proportions of villages between 1880 and 1921:

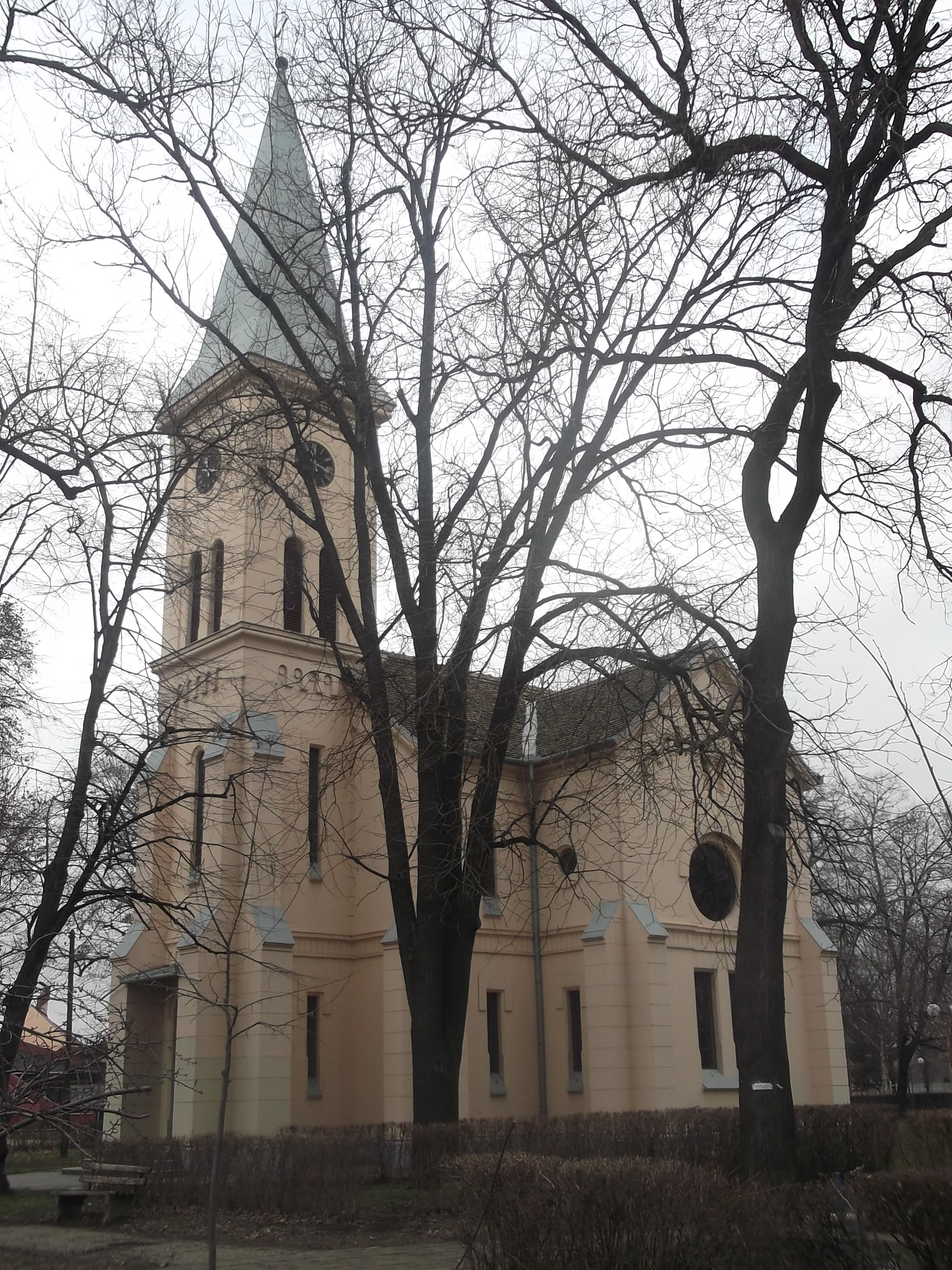
Slovak Evangelical church

Religion / year	1880	1910	1921
Roman Catholics	2 (0.55%)	278 (9.52%)	247 (7.88%)
Greek Catholics	—	2 (0.07%)	1 (0.03%)
Orthodox	—	15 (0.51%)	10 (0.32%)
Evangelicals^{2}	359 (99.45%)^{3}	1,617 (55.39%)	2,869 (91.51%)^{3}
Reformed	—	1,004 (34.38%)	—
Unitarians	—	1 (0.03%)	—
Jewish	—	3 (0.10%)	8 (0.26%)
Total	361 (100.00%)	2,920 (100.00%)	3,135 (100.00%)

Notes:

- ^{1} Under "others" are mostly Slovaks.
- ^{2} The term evangelical (ger.: evangelisch) has often been used to denote mainline Protestants (esp. Lutherans) in parts of continental Europe.
- ^{3} Lutherans and reformed together.

== Culture ==
- Two of the cultural associations in Vojlovica, Slovak and Hungarian, have annual festivals dedicated to harvesting products originating from wheat.
- The village population is annually celebrating archangel Michael day, which occurred on 29 September. It is held on the nearest Sunday.

== Notable residents ==
- Biszák Júlia, folk singer
- Katarína Kalmárová, folk singer

== See also ==
- Vojlovica monastery
- Pančevo
