= Ábel Szocska =

Ábel Antal Szocska, O.S.B.M.
- Eparchial Bishop of Hungarian Catholic Eparchy of Nyíregyháza
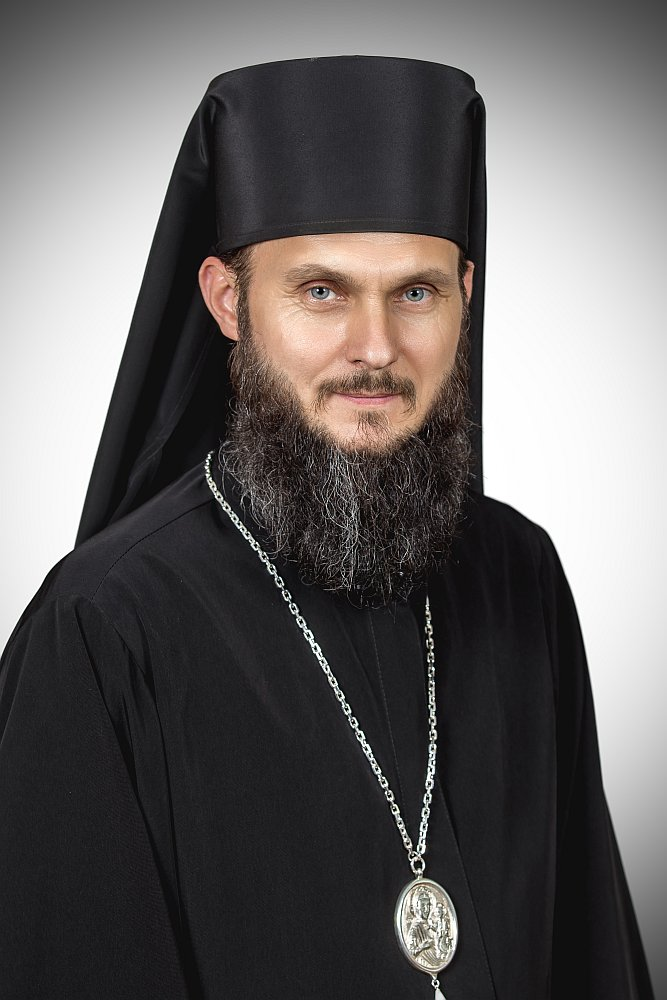
- Church: Hungarian Greek Catholic Church
- Appointed: 31 October 2015 (as Apostolic Administrator); 7 April 2018 (as Eparchial Bishop)
- Predecessor: Atanáz Orosz (as Ap. Administrator)
- Successor: Incumbent
- Other post(s): Protohegumen of the Hungarian province of the O.S.B.M. (since 2008)

Orders
- Ordination: 30 September 2001 (Priest) by Szilárd Keresztes
- Consecration: 10 May 2018 (Bishop) by Péter Fülöp Kocsis

Personal details
- Born: Anatoliy Sochka; 21 September 1972 (age 52); Vynohradiv, Ukrainian SSR, Soviet Union

Bishop Ábel Antal Szocska, O.S.B.M. (Ukrainian: Авель Сочка; born 21 September 1972) is a Hungarian Greek Catholic hierarch. He is serving as the first Eparchial Bishop of the Hungarian Catholic Eparchy of Nyíregyháza from 31 October 2015 (until 7 April 2018 he was an Apostolic Administrator of the same Eparchy).

== Biography ==
Born in Vynohradiv, Ukrainian SSR in 1972, he was ordained a priest on 30 September 2001 by Bishop Szilárd Keresztes. He was appointed the Apostolic Administrator by the Holy See on 31 October 2015.

Catholic Church titles
| Preceded by Atanáz Orosz (as Ap. Administrator) | Apostolic Administrator of Nyíregyháza; 2015–2018 | Succeeded by himself as Eparchial Bishop |
| Preceded by himself as Apostolic Administrator | Eparchial Bishop of Nyíregyháza; 2018–present | Incumbent |
