= Hungarian Catholic Eparchy of Nyíregyháza =

Eastern Catholic eparchy in Hungary

Eparchy of Nyíregyháza Dioecesis Nyiregyhazanus Nyíregyházi egyházmegye
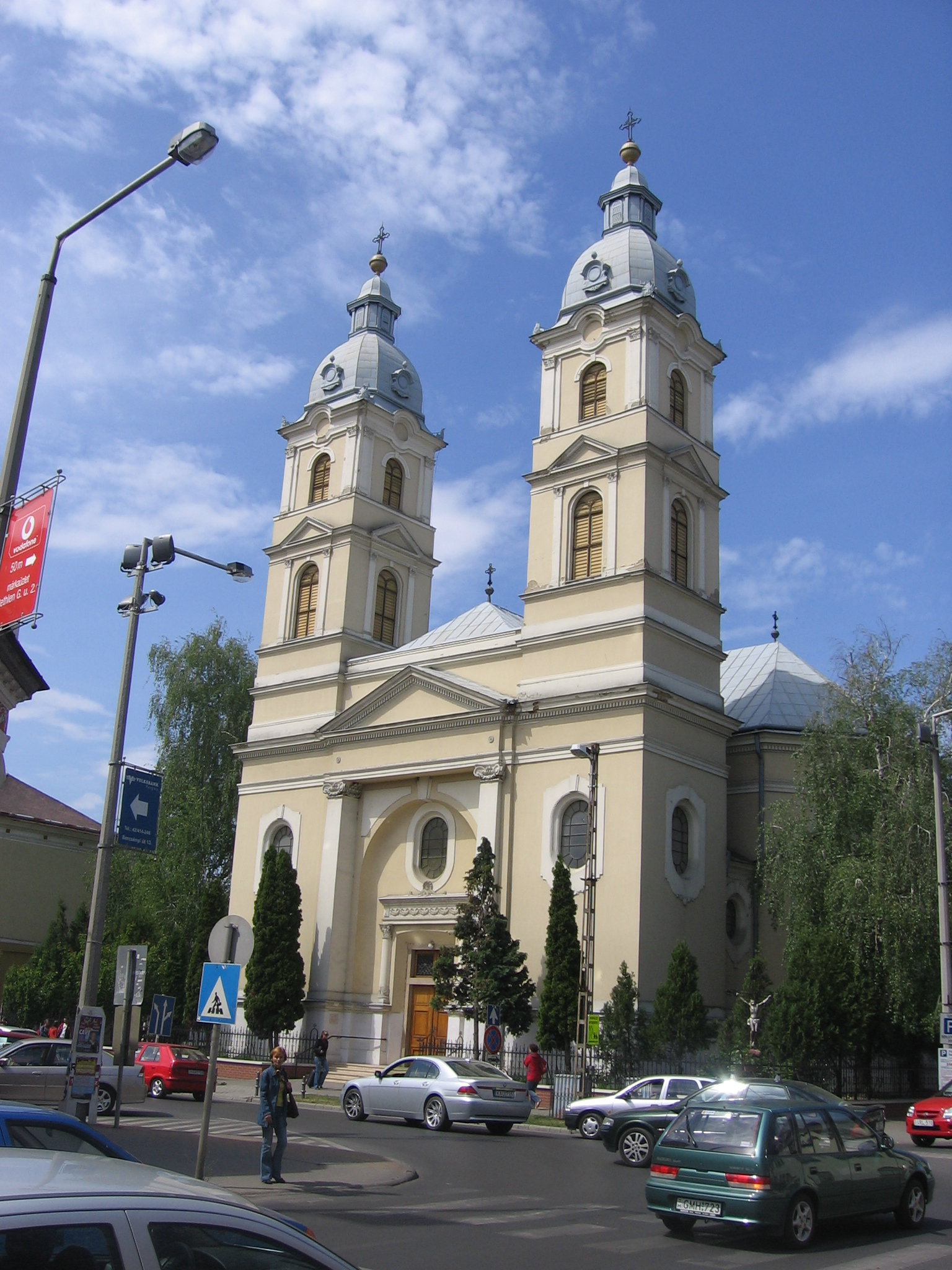
- Cathedral of the diocese

Location
- Country: Hungary
- Ecclesiastical province: Hungarian Greek Catholic Church
- Metropolitan: sui iuris
- Coordinates: 47°57′20″N 21°42′51″E

Statistics
- Area: 5,936 km^{2} (2,292 sq mi)
- Population: Total; Catholics: (as of 2016); 559,272; 102,484 (18.3%)

Information
- Rite: Byzantine Rite
- Cathedral: Cathedral of St. Nicholas in Nyíregyháza

Current leadership
- Pope: Leo XIV
- Bishop: Ábel Szocska
- Metropolitan Archbishop: Péter Fülöp Kocsis

Map
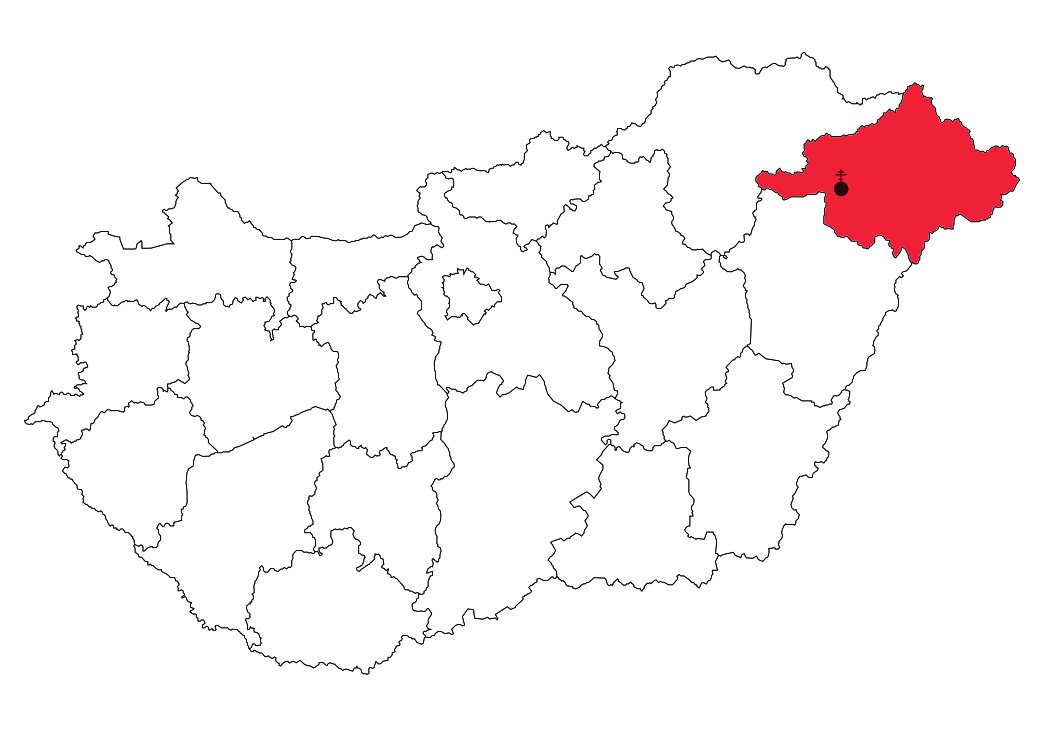
- Territory of the Eparchy of Nyíregyháza

Website
- Website

The Eparchy of Nyíregyháza is an eparchy (diocese) of the Hungarian Greek Catholic Church, an Eastern Catholic church which uses the Byzantine Rite in the Hungarian language.

It's cathedral church is Szent Miklós Görögkatolikus székesegyház which is situated in the city of Nyíregyháza, Hungary. It is a suffragan diocese of the Archeparchy of Hajdúdorog, a Metropolitanate sui juris and the Greek Catholics in Hungary' only province.

== History ==
The eparchy was erected by the Holy See on 20 March 2015, on territory split off from the then Eparchy of Hajdúdorog, which at the same time was elevated to an Archeparchy and became Nyíregyházai's Metropolitan, the other suffragan being the former Apostolic Exarchate of Miskolc, which was simultaneously promoted to Eparchy.

== Eparchial Bishops ==
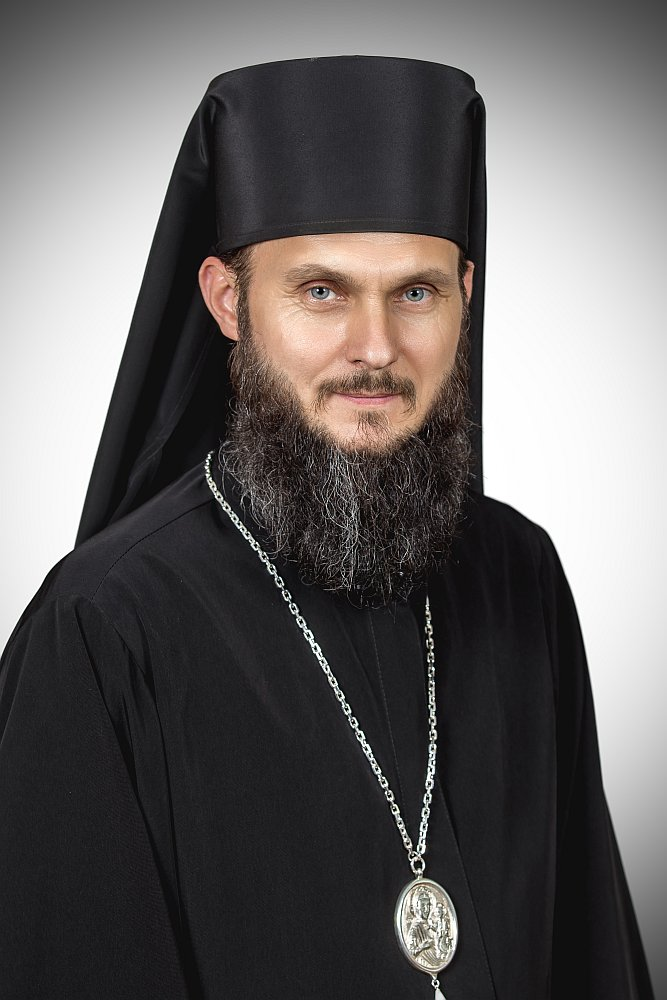
Eparch Ábel Szocska

Apostolic administrators:

- Atanáz Orosz, bishop of Miskolc (20 Mar 2015 – 31 Oct 2015)
- Fr. Ábel Szocska, O.S.B.M. (31 Oct 2015 – 7 Apr 2018)

Eparchial Bishops:

- Ábel Szocska, O.S.B.M. (since 7 Apr 2018)

== Source and External links ==
- GigaCatholic with episcopal incumbent biography links
