= Hungarian Greek Catholic Church =

Eastern Catholic church

Coordinates: 47.9554°N 21.7124°E

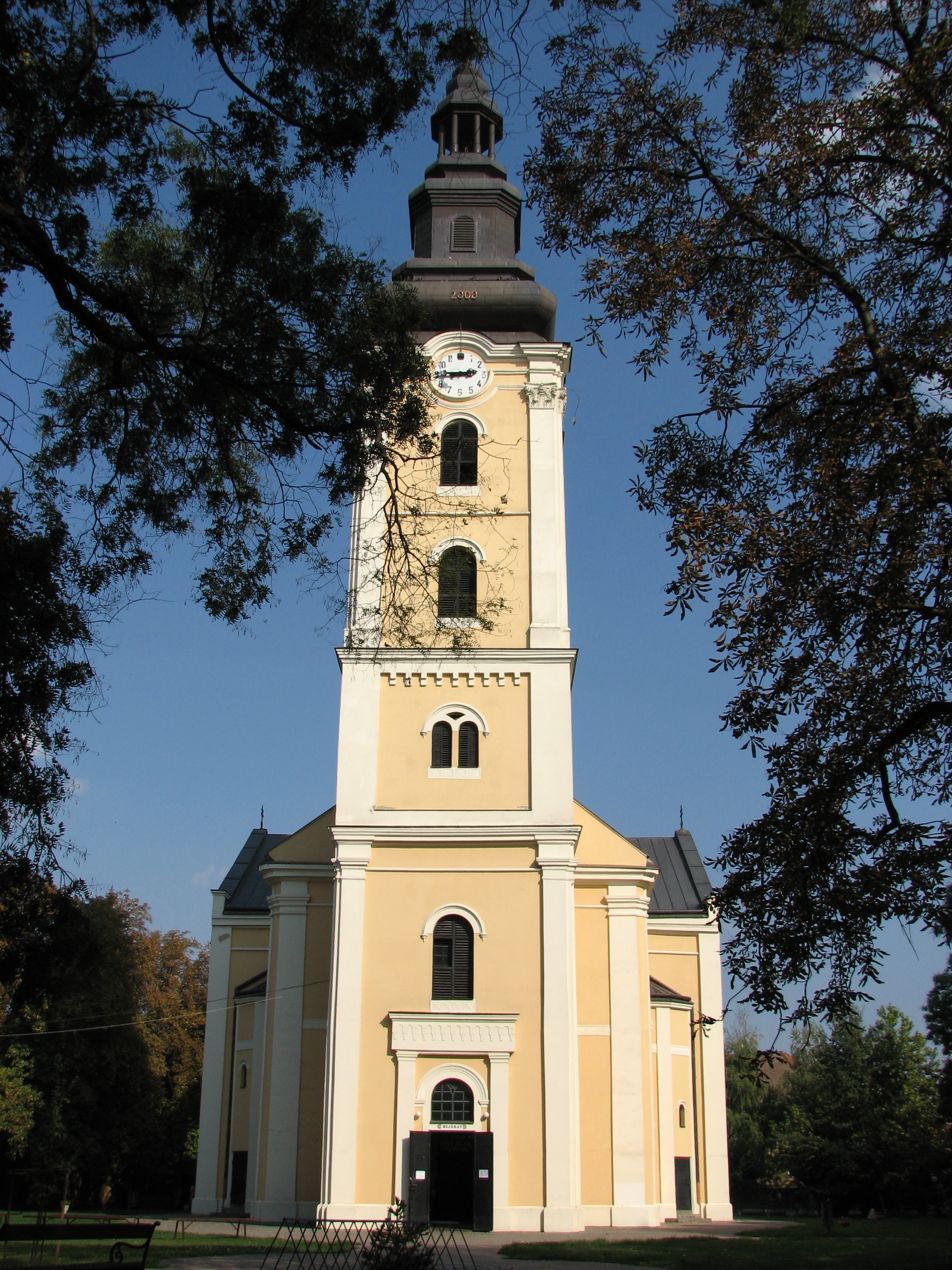
- Cathedral of Hajdúdorog, Hajdúdorog
- Type: Particular church (sui iuris)
- Classification: Christian
- Orientation: Eastern Catholic
- Theology: Catholic theology
- Polity: Episcopal
- Governance: Metropolitanate
- Pope: Leo XIV
- Archbishop: Metropolitan Péter Fülöp Kocsis
- Region: Hungary
- Language: Hungarian
- Liturgy: Byzantine Rite
- Headquarters: Debrecen, Hungary
- Founder: Franz Joseph I
- Origin: 8 June 1912; Austria-Hungary
- Separated from: Ruthenian and Romanian Greek-Catholic churches
- Branched from: Catholic Church
- Congregations: 187
- Members: 326,200
- Official website: gorogkatolikus.hu

Greek Catholic Church in Hungary administrative divisions

The Hungarian Greek Catholic Church (Note: Hungarian: Magyar görögkatolikus egyház; Latin: Ecclesia Graeco-Catholica Hungariae) or the Byzantine Catholic Church in Hungary is a sui iuris (autonomous) Eastern Catholic church based in Hungary. As a particular church of the Catholic Church, it is in full communion with the Holy See. Its liturgical usage is that of the Byzantine Rite in the Hungarian language.

== History ==
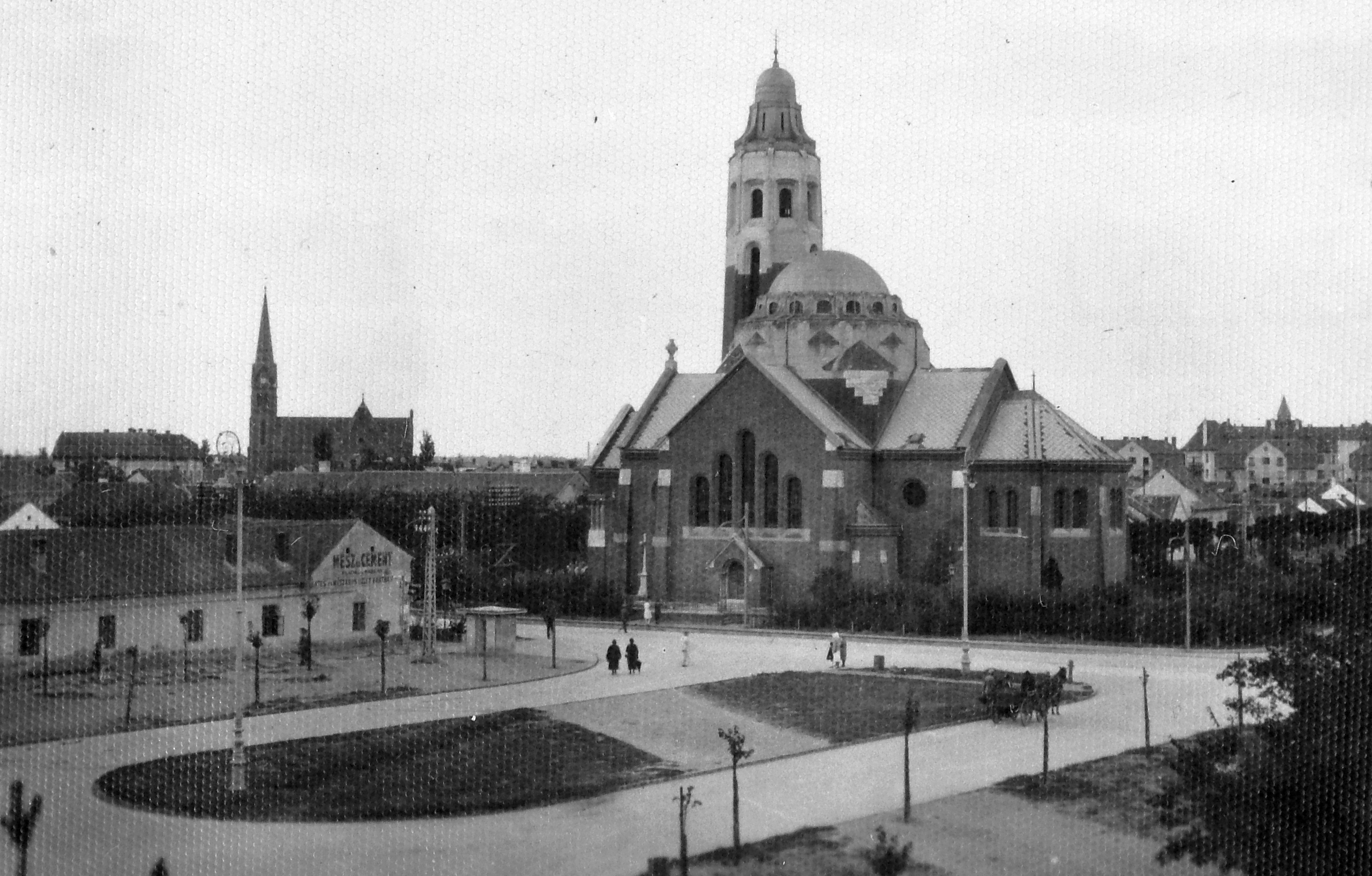
The Greek Catholic Cathedral of the Protection of the Mother of God in Debrecen, 1939

=== Development of Greek Catholicism ===
Hungary's Eastern Catholics were originally concentrated in what is now northeastern Hungary. This region was historically inhabited by Byzantine Rite Christians from the Carpathian Mountains (especially Ruthenians and Romanians). Serbs fleeing the Turkish advance arrived later in what was then Hungary, but most stayed in the area that is now part of Serbia. Later still, when the Turks were driven back from Vienna in 1683 and from Buda and central Hungary in 1686, Ruthenians and Slovaks settled in the abandoned lands of Hungary. They were cared for by the Ruthenian Eparchy of Mukacheve (Hungarian: Munkács). In the 17-18th centuries, during the conflict with Protestants, many Hungarians joined the Greek Catholic Church, and so adopted the Byzantine Rite rather than the Latin, which resulted in a considerable increase in their number.

Perhaps largely because of this last element, Byzantine Hungarians began to use the Hungarian language in their liturgy. A translation of the Liturgy of Saint John Chrysostom for private study was published in 1795. A book containing the parts of the liturgy that the people sing appeared in 1862. Representatives of 58 Hungarian-speaking parishes met in 1868 and set up an organization to promote the liturgical use of the Hungarian language and the establishment of a separate eparchy. In 1882 there was the publication, without formal ecclesiastical approval, of a Hungarian translation of the Liturgy of Saint John Chrysostom for actual use, which was soon followed by Hungarian translations of other liturgical texts.

=== Sui iuris status ===
Finally, on 8 June 1912, Pope Pius X established the Eparchy of Hajdúdorog for the 162 Hungarian-speaking Greek Catholic parishes. He limited the use of Hungarian to non-liturgical functions, requiring the clergy to use Greek in the liturgy, but granted an interval of three years for the change of language to be effected. Because of the outbreak of the First World War, this interval was prolonged indefinitely, and use of Hungarian has continued.

The change of national frontiers after the First World War led to the reduction of the territory of the Eparchy of Hajdúdorog from the 168 parishes to which it had grown to only 90. Within Hungary there were also 21 parishes of the Eparchy of Prešov and one of the Eparchy of Mukačevo. On 4 June 1924, these were brought together as the new Exarchate of Miskolc, at first - because at that time they still used Church Slavonic in the liturgy - classified as Ruthenian, but now considered part of the Hungarian Greek Catholic Church.

The church was in a unique position under the Hungarian Communist regime. Unlike its counterparts in bordering Romania, Slovakia or Soviet Ukraine, it was neither outlawed nor especially targeted for persecution. Factors for this relative leniency include the church's small size, its poverty (northeast Hungary, where its adherents are concentrated, has historically been the country's poorest area) as well as the near absence of an Orthodox jurisdiction into which Greek Catholics could have been forced to merge.

=== Later developments ===
The territory of the eparchy at first corresponded to that of the Latin Church Archdiocese of Eger in eastern Hungary and Budapest. Its jurisdiction was extended on 17 July 1980 to the whole of Hungary.

On 20 March 2015, Pope Francis elevated the Hungarian Church to a metropolitanate with Debrecen as its metropolitan see, naming Bishop Fülöp Kocsis as its metropolitan. He also raised the Apostolic Exarchate of Miskolc to the status of an eparchy, to be headed by Bishop Atanáz Orosz. Finally he erected the Eparchy of Nyíregyháza from territory previously within the See of Hajdúdorog. The two eparchies are suffragans of the Hajdúdorog see.

Some Hungarian Greek Catholics have emigrated to North America, where their few parishes fall under the jurisdiction of the Metropolis of Pittsburgh in the Ruthenian Greek Catholic Church. More than half of the diocesan priests are married.

== Structure ==
The Hungarian Greek Catholic Church comprises a single ecclesiastical province, which consists of the metropolitan archeparchy and two suffragan eparchies:

- Archeparchy of Hajdúdorog
  - Eparchy of Miskolc
  - Eparchy of Nyiregyhaza

Greek Catholic eparchs (bishops) are members of the (mainly Latin) episcopal conference of Hungary.

=== Current hierarchy of the church ===
The present Hungarian Greek Catholic episcopate (3 hierarchs as per 13 August 2025) is as follows:

Metropolitan Archbishop:

- Péter Fülöp Kocsis, Metropolitan Archbishop of Hajdúdorog (since 2008)

Eparchial Bishops:

- Atanáz Orosz, Bishop of Miskolc (since 2011)
- Ábel Szocska, OSBM, Bishop of Nyíregyháza (since 2018)

Emeritus Hierarchs:

- None

== See also ==
- Catholic Church in Hungary
