= Cathedral of Hajdúdorog =

Coordinates: 47°49′03″N 21°29′58″E

- Greek Catholic Cathedral of the Presentation of Mary in Hajdúdorog
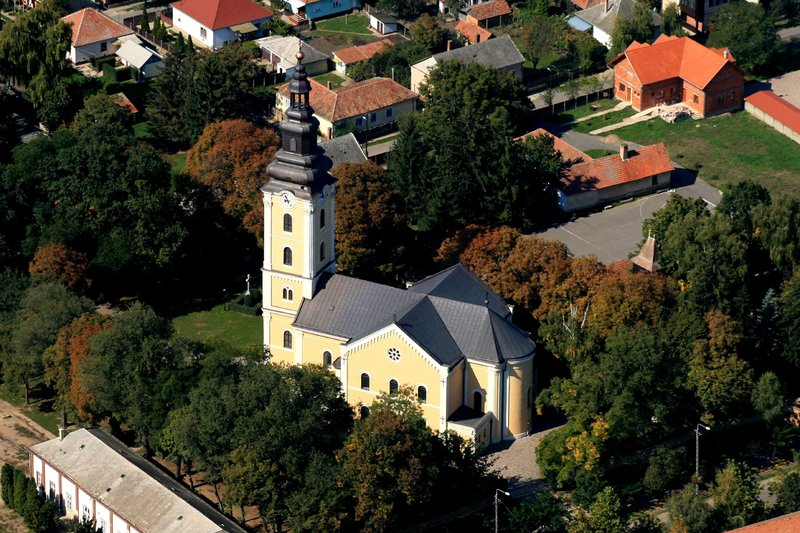
- Aerial view of the cathedral

- Position in Hungary
- Location: Hajdúdorog
- Country: Hungary
- Denomination: Hungarian Greek Catholic
- Website: gorkatszekesegyhaz.hu

History
- Status: Cathedral
- Founded: 1764 September 2
- Founder: András Bacsinszky
- Dedication: Presentation of Mary
- Dedicated: 1876
- Consecrated: 1772 November
- Events: Extended in 1868–1872; Renovated in 1937–1938, 1989–1990 and 2000–2006

Architecture
- Heritage designation: National Cultural Heritage
- Designated: 1958
- Style: Baroque Revival

Specifications
- Length: 38 m (124 ft 8 in)
- Width: 21 m (68 ft 11 in)
- Height: 48 m (157 ft 6 in)
- Materials: Brick

Administration
- Archdiocese: Archeparchy of Hajdúdorog

Clergy
- Archbishop: Péter Fülöp Kocsis

The Cathedral of Hajdúdorog, officially Greek Catholic Cathedral of the Presentation of Mary in Hajdúdorog (Hungarian: Hajdúdorogi Istenszülő Bevezetése a Templomba Székesegyház) is the cathedral of the Archeparchy of Hajdúdorog, Hungary. This status ranks the cathedral among the most important buildings of the Hungarian Greek Catholic Church. The origins of the current cathedral reaches back to 1312, when historical notes mention that a church existed in the medieval settlement of Dorogegyháza. However, the present building has 17th century foundations, and it went through several building extensions and renovations during its history. The latest restoration were completed in 2006.

Pope Pius X raised the church to the rank of a cathedral in 1912 when he erected the Diocese of Hajdúdorog with the papal bull Christifideles Graeci. The interior reflects the traditions of the Greek Catholic liturgy and architecture. The most spectacular sign of it is the 200 years old iconostasis. The 11 meters (36 feet) tall wall of icons separates the three naves and the altar. The iconostasis contains 54 holy images and it is considered one of the most important iconostases in Hungary.

More than 80% of the inhabitants of Hajdúdorog are Greek Catholic thus the cathedral is a central scene for the everyday life of the town, especially during major religious feast days. The most visited events of the cathedral are the Christmas procession and the traditional Easter services when a local bread, the pászka is sanctified.

== History of the cathedral ==
The predecessor of the modern days Hajdúdorog was founded around the beginning of the 12th century. The center of the medieval town should have been around the present area of the cathedral. The manuscripts from 1312 name the town Dorogegyháza meaning Church of Dorog. This let historians think that some sort of Catholic church stood in the center of the settlement, probably in the place of today's cathedral.

However, the present character of the religion in Hajdúdorog started to take shape after the settlement of the Hajduks in the 17th century. According to the diploma of Korpona, issued by prince Stephen Bocskay in 1605 and reassured by palatine György Thurzó in 1616, Dorog along with other towns in the region became the possession of the Hajduks. The prince also granted them titles of nobility as a reward for their help in the wars against the Turks. The new owners of Dorog were all warriors and Orthodox Christians, but according to the palatine's list, most of them had Hungarian names. The Hajduks finally settled to Dorog in 1616. The first notes about the settlement's Byzantine rite community are from 1638. Bazil Taraszovics, bishop of Munkács appointed Dorog's priest, Radivoj Marinics, archdeacon. The remarkable position refers to the strength and prestige of the community. The Hajduks started to build a small fort in the center of the town. To defend the fort, they also constructed a brick watchtower. The tower was finished by 1640, and now it serves as the lower part of the cathedral's bell tower. Within the walls of Hajdúdorog, close to the watchtower, stood the remains of the old stone church. A number of Romanians fled to the newly established town to escape from the Turkish troops. The Byzantine community was soon split to two parishes: one parish served in Romanian language and the other in Church Slavonic (Hungarian wasn't a liturgical language in Eastern Orthodoxy, so it couldn't be used). The two parishes agreed in the use of the church building in 1667. The fort, the stone church and the watchtower were seriously damaged during the wars of the 17th century. In 1742 the tower was rebuilt close to the medieval church, and it reached the height of 24 m (78.7 ft.).
In 1646, the Hajduks were still busy with the construction of their fortifications against the Turkish army, when in Ungvár Eastern Orthodox bishops and priests signed the Union of Ungvár creating a new and independent Greek Catholic Apostolic Vicariate, where later Hajdúdorog belonged to.

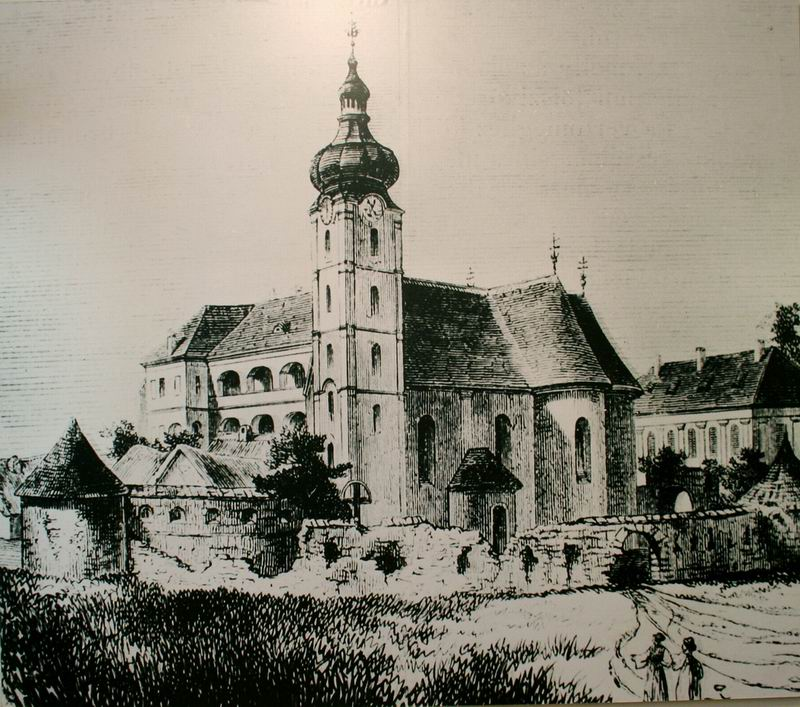
The Greek Catholic Church in Hajdúdorog on an etching from 1859

The importance of the Greek Catholic Church in Hungary increased under the rule of the strict Catholic Maria Theresa, who thought of Greek Catholicism as a consensus between Orthodoxy and Roman Catholicism. The empress erected the Eparchy of Munkács in 1771 and ordered Hajdúdorog under its jurisdiction. The Greek Catholic parish in Hajdúdorog had an adroit leader in these years, called András Bacsinszky, later bishop of Munkács. He organized the construction of the Greek Catholic church of the town, collecting the funds from the inhabitants. Bacsinszky even set up a brickwork in 1752 to produce building material for the church. The construction started on 2 September 1764 under the control of an architect, called Thomas from Munkács, and lasted until November 1772. The watchtower of the Hajduks was extended to reach the 48 m (157.5 ft) height, and topped by a Rococo (Zopf style) clad spire. The late baroque church itself was attached to the eastern side of the tower. It included only one nave in that time and had a length of 30 m (98.4 ft) and a width of 11 m (36 ft). The 17th-century tower had now double the size, and the old foundations were unable to carry the weight of the steeple. The tower had to be strengthened in 1784 and 1791, but in the end the carpenters had to remove 9.5 m (31.2 ft) from the spire of the steeple in 1857. (This is the reason why the shape of the present bell tower differs from the one on the etching from 1859.)

The parish of the new baroque church didn't spare money on the interior either. After the constructions of the church had finished, the priest hired painters, carvers and gilders to ornate the interior of the church according to the Byzantine traditions. The episcopal throne, the pulpit, the iconostasis, the side altar and the main altar with the canopy were made for the baroque church between 1790 and 1816. The first (and for a long time the only) fresco, depicting the Trinity, was painted in 1780 by an unknown diocesan artist.
According to the latest research in the archive of the diocese, and based on the professional report of the restorers, the parish hired the highest qualified iconostasis carver, called Miklós Jankovits who probably worked with a local carver, László Lengyel. The church contracted with Mátyás Hittner and János Szűcs in 1808 to paint the icons of the iconostasis. They finished the work in 1816.

By the 19th century the Greek Catholic Church established a strong and stable position in the Habsburg monarchy. The only thing that shattered its unity was the rising of nationalism. Hungarian speaking Greek Catholics still couldn't use their mother tongue in their holy services, so they started to raise their voice for the Hungarian liturgy. This movement was started by Hungarian translations of religious texts, sermons and songs; and later peaked with the so-called Hajdúdorog Movement. In 1821 the town council of Hajdúdorog abolished the Romanian parish and its services, because the majority of the town spoke Hungarian. Thus the only Greek Catholic parish that remained, served in Church Slavonic language. The lieutenant of Hajdúdorog, that time the leader of the town, named Lajos Farkas started a nationwide movement for the papal acknowledgement of the Hungarian language in Greek Catholic liturgy. Farkas' initiative spread quickly in the country among the Hungarian speaking Greek Catholics. The case got influential supporters from the upper house of the parliament and from the government too, though their purpose was more political than religious. Erecting a Hungarian Greek Catholic diocese was handy for the central government's Magyarization efforts. A Greek Catholic synod was held in the church of Hajdúdorog on 16 April 1868 that marked the start of the Movement of Hajdúdorog. Due to the decisions of the synod Emperor Franz Joseph erected the Vicariate Forane of Hajdúdorog under the jurisdiction of the Eparchy of Munkács.
To commemorate and to celebrate the success of the synod, the town decided to renovate and extend the church. The constructions started in the summer of 1868. The Northern and Southern walls of the original church were opened with large arches, and two naves were attached to the baroque building on both sides. These side naves, or aisles, were constructed to hold a gallery accessible by spiral stairways from outside of the church. A gallery was created on the western side too allowing access from the bell tower of the church. The church received its present form by the end of the renovation works in 1876. The simple Greek Catholic church was transformed to a three naves basilica. The outside appearance of the building went through major changes too. The church lost its original baroque ornaments, it was replaced by eclectic elements, and the bell tower got larger windows.

The interior of the church saw large changes and renovation too. The parish hired two painters, György Révész and Gyula Petrovics, and a gilder, Károly Müller to renovate and decorate the church interior. Révész painted the Last Supper for the main altar and the Descent from the Cross to the side altar. He was the master of the seccos that can be seen in the sanctuary, and probably with the help of Petrovics, he painted the three frescos of the ceiling: Assumption, Destroying the idols and In the age of Saint Stephen. Petrovics and Müller restored the iconostasis. They removed all the icons from the wall, Petrovics even made some changes to some of the holy images. They followed a wrong order in the so-called Feasts row when putting the icons back to the iconostasis. The renovated basilica was consecrated in 1876 and in the same time the church got dedicated to the Presentation of Mary.

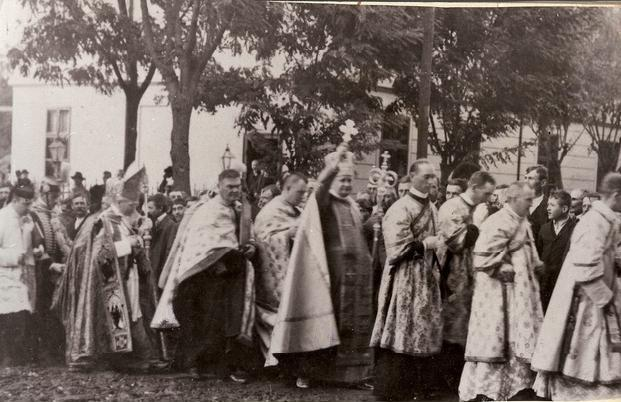
Consecration of István Miklósy, the first bishop of the Diocese of Hajdúdorog in 1913

The members of the Hajdúdorog Movement realized that their major goal, that is to use the Hungarian as an official language in the Greek Catholic liturgy, can be achieved only through the establishment of an independent Hungarian Greek Catholic diocese. The vicar forane organized a pilgrimage to Rome in 1900 to present their case and their arguments to the pope. Leo XIII granted a papal audience to the representatives of the Hungarian Greek Catholics and considered their case, but didn't erect the new diocese. In 1901 the church regained its original spire to commemorate the pilgrimage to Rome. Under the guidance of Gábor Katona, carpenter from Hajdúnánás, the spire of the bell tower was removed and replaced according to the original plans. A large, 1 m diameter globe was placed on the top of the Rococo roof structure to hold a Greek Catholic cross made of wrought iron. They put the list of the Roman pilgrims inside of this globe.
The pilgrimage and the Movement of Hajdúdorog finally reached its goal on 8 June 1912, when Pope Pius X erected the Diocese of Hajdúdorog in his Christifideles Graeci bull, and raised the church of Hajdúdorog to the rank of a cathedral. István Miklósy the first bishop of the Hungarian Greek Catholic Diocese was consecrated in the cathedral on 5 October 1913. The bishop's offices were moved first to Debrecen, then to Nyíregyháza because of the lack of infrastructure in Hajdúdorog at those times.

In 1938 Budapest hosted the 34th Eucharistic Congress bringing thousands of pilgrims and church leaders to the country. The congress was preceded by an extensive church renovation project throughout the country, not leaving Hajdúdorog untouched either. The works started in 1937, and it resulted in a decrease of the artistic value of the building and its interior. Since the renovations were initiated by the Roman Catholic Church, the Cathedral of Hajdúdorog was restored in a Latin way, losing its Byzantine characteristics. The original frescoes were painted over with low quality, neobaroque images; and all the furniture, including the iconostasis, were colored to oil green. The main altar's Last Supper painting was replaced by the Latin style Enthronement of Mary image. After the Second World War the National Office of Cultural Heritage declared the restoration low quality, and they suggested the removal of the 1937 paintings.

During the years of the communism the cathedral was neglected. The water soaked walls were the largest problem of the building by the 1980s, that threatened the wall paintings of the cathedral. Only temporary solutions were introduced until 2000. In 1989 László Puskás and his wife, Nadia were selected to repaint the ceiling frescoes of the cathedral. The couple was trained in Ukraine and they finished their work in 1990. The painters coordinated with the priests and the bishop of the cathedral on the theological and iconographical program of the frescoes to replace the Latin rite images. The fresco of the Puskás couple was consecrated on 21 November 1990, on the 350th anniversary of the cathedral. These paintings cover the ceiling of the cathedral today.

Szilárd Keresztes, bishop of Hajdúdorog started the overall renovation of the neglected cathedral in 1999 after getting financial support from the Hungarian government and the European Union. The walls and the foundations of the church were dried up and insulated, the façade was restored, the roof and the spire was rebuilt entirely and the church interior was renovated too. Györgyi Károlyi and Csongor Bedő controlled the restoration of the iconostasis, the altars, the episcopal throne, the pulpit and other furniture. The restoration works lasted until 2006.

On 30 June 2008, almost hundred years after the first bishop's consecration, the cathedral hosted Péter Fülöp Kocsis' installation to his episcopal office. Kocsis started to renovate the most important pilgrimage site of the diocese and of the country in Máriapócs. The shrine houses the holy icon of the Weeping Madonna, which was transferred to the Cathedral of Hajdúdorog for the time of the renovation works. The icon was displayed on the pulpit from 7 February until 5 September 2009. The holy image of the Theotokos was carried to and from Hajdúdorog in a procession.
The relics of Saint Stephen, the patron saint of the diocese, and Clemens Maria Hofbauer were placed in the cathedral's Southern nave on 21 November 2010 by bishop Kocsis. The relics were gifts from Christoph Schönborn, cardinal of Vienna. Recently the Cathedral of Hajdúdorog served as one of the venues of the celebrations of the 100 years old diocese. It hosted the opening ceremony on 18 February 2012 and the Ecumenical Congress of the Carpathian Basin on 1 December. On 2 December 2012 a new bronze gate was consecrated.

== The cathedral ==
There is one church in the town; cross shaped, and its altar is facing East. It is covered by four domes each has a cross on its top. The Eastern dome is much larger and wider than the others; though the Western dome, that holds the bells of the church, is taller. The two other domes are smaller than these ones. So, this church is quite original and extraordinary from architectural point of view.

— unknown Russian soldier's diary from 1849, Györffy, Katona, Klaniczay, Stoll, Szakály (1988)

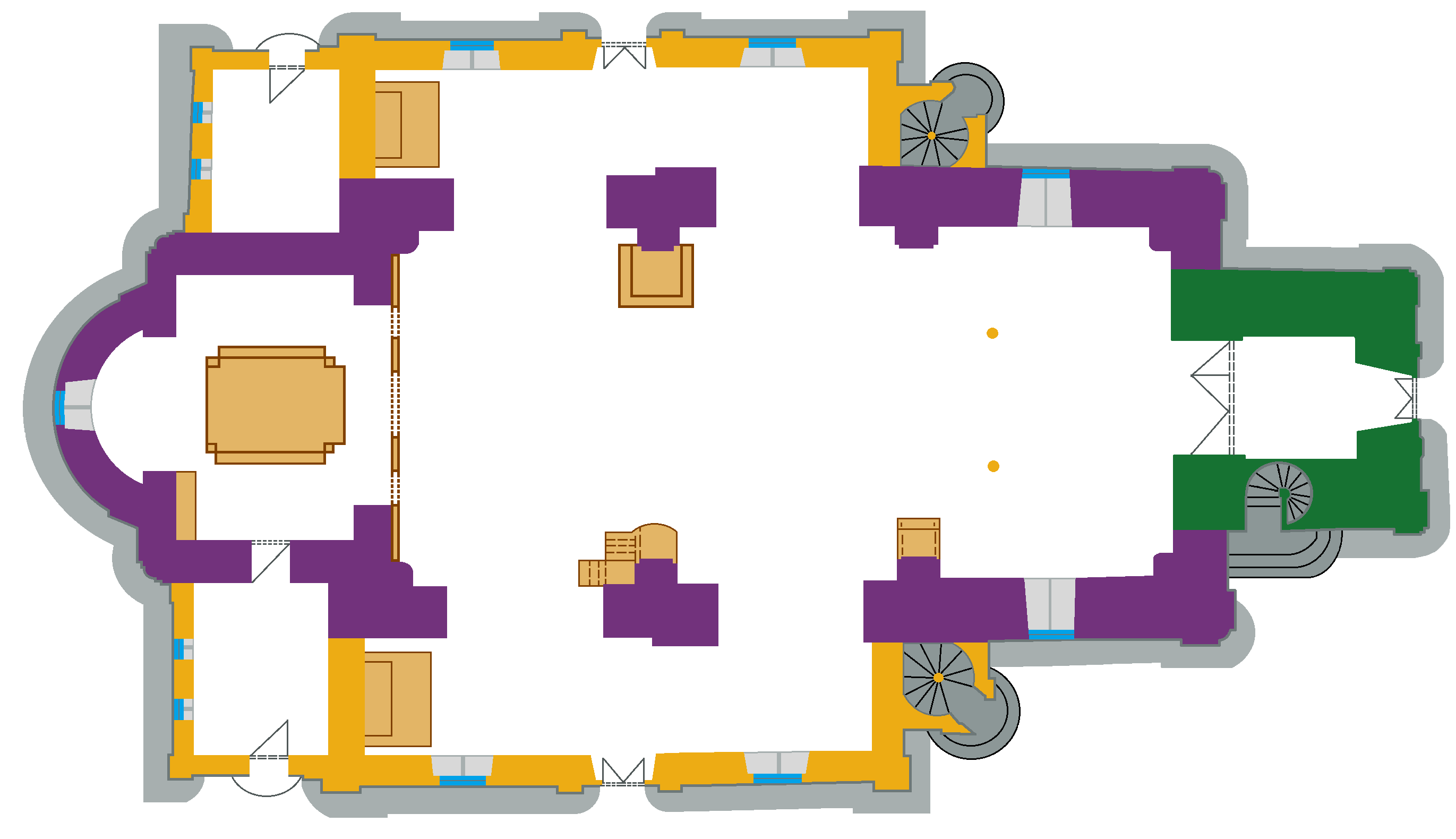
Floor plan of the cathedral: Green marks the 17th century foundations of the belfry; the baroque walls are in purple, and yellow indicates the 19th century aisles

The above lines of the Russian soldier described the Greek Catholic church of Hajdúdorog properly in the time of the Hungarian Revolution of 1848. The 1872 constructions basically didn't change the structure of the cathedral, only added two aisles to the building. The main altar is still facing towards the East according to the traditions of church orientation, and the main entrance, along with the steeple, is situated on the West. The sacristy is on the northern side of the cathedral with a direct connection to the main altar. On the southern side there is a religious store, as the Southern equivalent of the sacristy. The sacristy and the store are covered with flat roof. The three naves have a hip roof made of tin. These are described as domes in the Russian soldier's diary.
From inside the main nave's ceiling is constructed as a simple dome under the wooden structure of the roof, with the pendentive being part of the dome. The aisles have the role of emphasizing the area of the main nave, and they are covered with so-called barrel vaults. Above these vaults the galleries look to the nave, again to express its importance.

The cathedral has a longitudinal plan with a long nave in the middle. All of the major extensions of the building can be easily connected to an architectural style. The different width of the walls refers to the age, when a particular part of the cathedral was constructed. The foundation of the bell tower is the oldest part of the present day basilica, and it has 190 cm (6.23 ft.) wide walls. The main nave and the apse were added next in the baroque period. The walls here range between 135 and 162 cm (4.43–5.31 ft.) width. The youngest attachments to the cathedral were the aisles in the 19th century. They have the thinnest walls measuring "only" 80 cm (2.26 ft.).

=== Exterior and Architecture ===
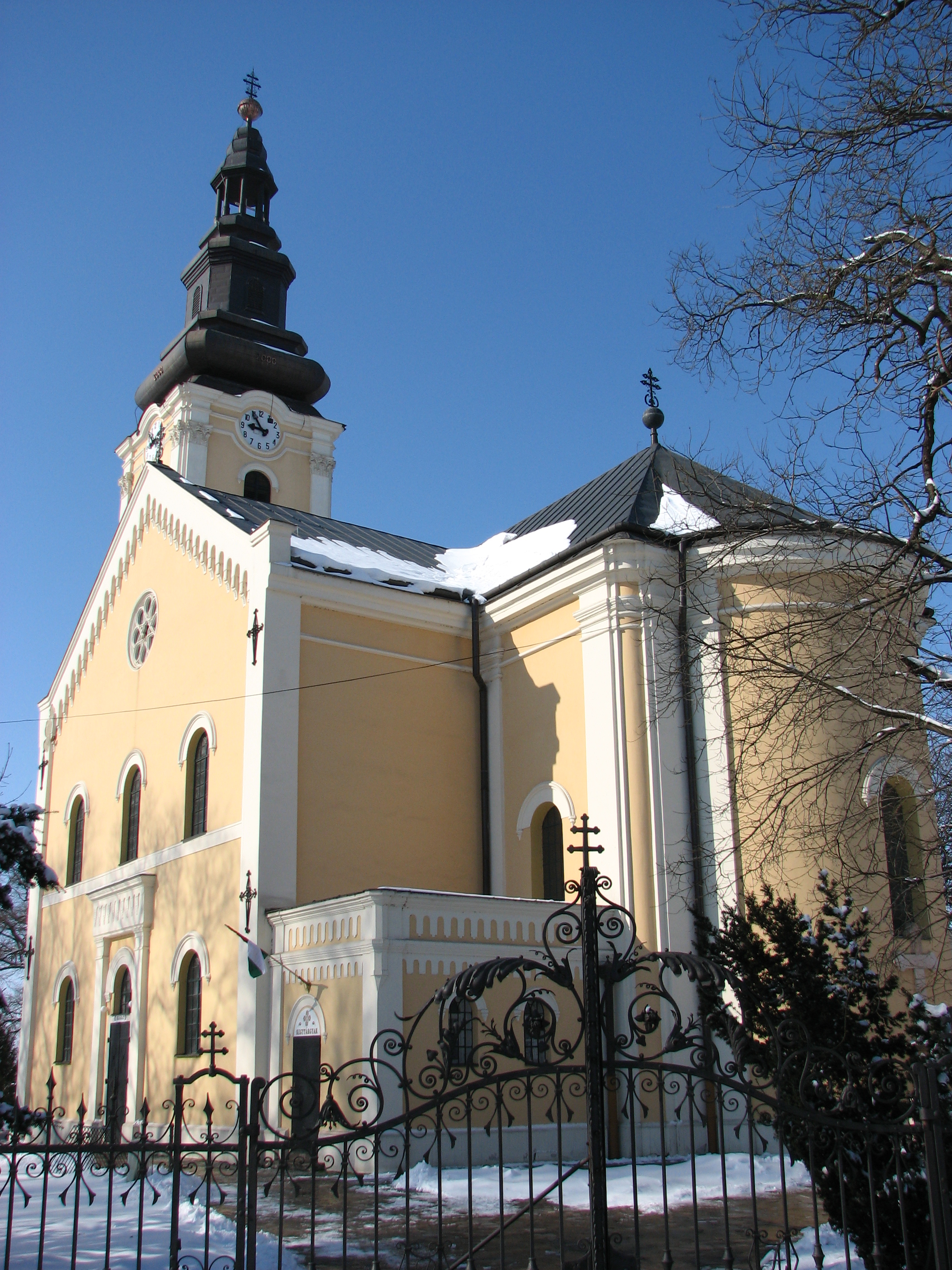
The South-Eastern façade

According to an old local saying, the tower of the cathedral can be seen from each street of the town. It was considered as the sign of God's presence everywhere, and it reminded everyone to their Greek Catholic faith. Today this old saying is not quite true, but the façade of the cathedral is still definitely the most characteristic part of Hajdúdorog's townscape. The Cathedral of the Presentation of Mary is 38 m (124.67 ft.) long, 21 m (68.9 ft.) wide and 48 m (157 ft.) tall. The Eastern façade of the building is dominated by the semicircular apse. A 3.5 m (11.48 ft.) tall, marble cross is embedded in the outer wall of the apse. It was erected in 1906 and commemorates four religious missions related to important church events and retreats. According to the records on the cross, the first retreat was between 17 and 21 March 1906. The icon of the Theotokos of Máriapócs started to shed tears for the third times in December 1905. The retreat remembered to this mirracle. The original text on the cross says: Erected to the Memory of the Holy Mission between 17 and 21 March. 1906. (Hungarian: Emeltetett az 1906. Év Márcz. 17-21ig Megtartott Szt. Missió Emlékére).
The second retreat was in 1930 March 22–30 to join to the Saint Emeric year of the Hungarian Catholic Church. The third holy mission was held on 26 March – 3 April 1938 during the Eucharistic Congress in Budapest. The last date carved in the marble cross is 12–19 March 1944. The exact background of the retreat is unknown, but probably it was connected to World War II.

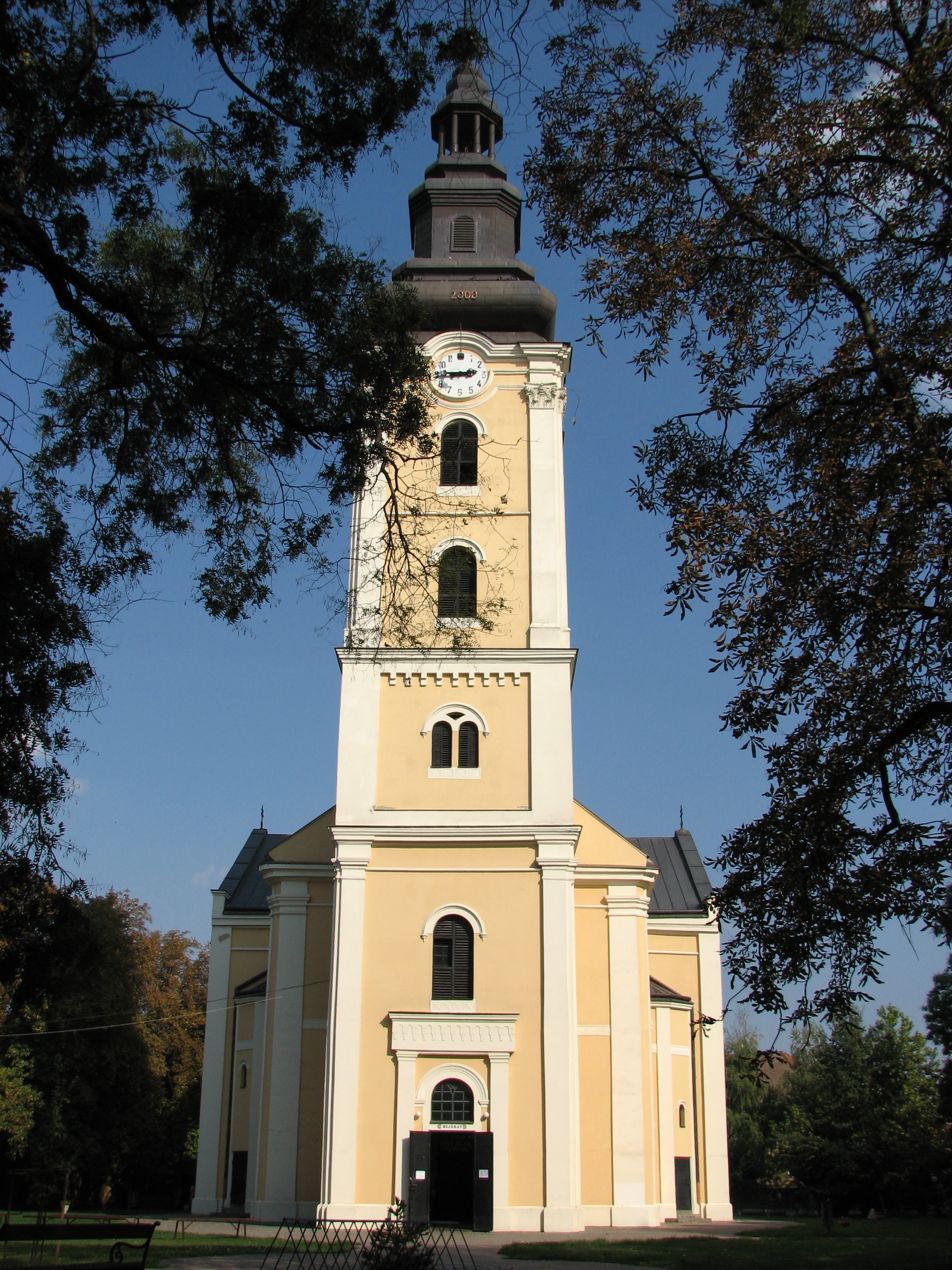
Western façade of the cathedral

The cathedral's façade on the Southern and Northern side look pretty much the same. The most characteristic part is the 15 m (49.2 ft.) long and 4 m (13 ft.) wide aisle with typical revival style ornaments and partitioning. The gabled façade reaches 17 m (55.7 ft.) height on both sides. With their robust appearance they are resembling to the Romanesque style. White pilasters frame the sides, and they are running upwards to melt into the arched frieze on the top. Originally a statue stood on the roof above each pilasters, but they were removed during the renovation works in 2000. Four crosses, made of wrought iron, are decorating now the pilasters.
The cathedral has gates both on the Southern and the northern side. They are situated in the central axis of the side façades. The cathedral has altogether 3 entrances. Beside the entrances to the aisles, there is a main gate on the western side, made of bronze. Traditionally those who are living in Hajdúdorog, enter the cathedral from their homes' direction. The gates of the aisles look exactly the same. They are framed by white pilasters topped by Doric capitals. The windows of the side naves are on three different levels. There are two arched windows on the level of the entrance. Above them, there are three more windows opening from the so-called choir galleries, and on the top of each aisle façade a rose window with 8 mullions was added.

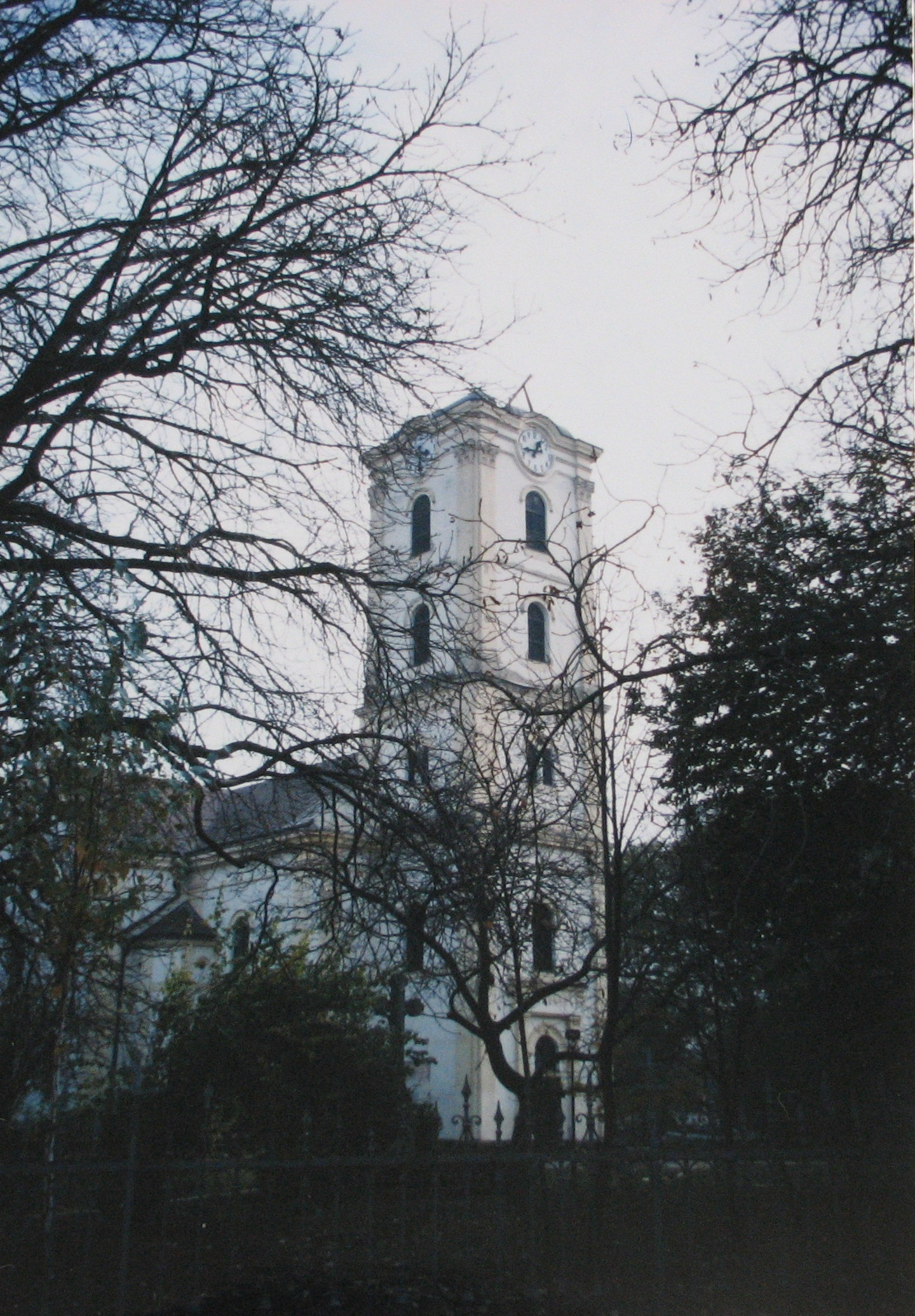
Changing of the spire in 2000. Note that this exterior shows the old, reverse coloring of the cathedral.

The sacristy and the religious store are on the eastern part of the side naves. The flat-roofed buildings have the same width as the 19th century naves. There are two other entrances on the Northern façade of the basilica. Both of them opens to a spiral stairway. The one, built in the bell tower, leads up to the organ gallery on the West, and the other stairway goes to the Northern choir gallery. There is only one spiral stairway on the southern side of the church. It leads to the Southern choir gallery. Looking to the side façades of the cathedral there are still two plaques worth to mention. The plaque on the northern side of the tower commemorates the 1869 restoration and extension works: "Renovated by the community of Hajdu Dorogh to the glory of Our Lord in 1869". The Southern façade holds a marble plaque about the 1937 renovations: "Outer renovation was made in the 1937th year of the Lord to commemorate the 34th Eucharistic Congress. The ornaments of the gates were added in the same year from the donations of the widow lady Kömmerling. The work was done by jr. János Simon, certified stonemason."

The Western façade is the most typical part of the cathedral. It is dominated by the 48 m (157.6 ft.) tall church steeple, which reaches the 50 m (164 ft.) height if we count the Greek Catholic cross on the top. Two belt courses divide the tower into three different parts. The lowest bit is 12 m (39.4 ft.) tall, and just like the main entrance, it is decorated with Doric pilasters. The middle part of the tower is 5 m (16.4 ft.) tall. It has white frames, and its primary function is to connect the main nave and its roof to the bell tower. The tower's top section is 12.5 m (41 ft.) tall. It has two windows, and it is decorated with two pilasters with Corinthian capitals. The three parts of the tower together is 29.5 m (96.8 ft.) tall. This adds up the height of the bell tower, the brick structure of the steeple.

The steeple functions also as a clock tower. It has a 2.5 m (8.2 ft.) diameter clock face on the four sides, right under the steeple's belfry part. During the 2000 renovations the clock stopped working. It was only in 2010 when the old, shabby clock work was changed to a new digital engine. The old clock work is still in its original wooden case in the belfry.

The Zopf style spire of the tower was fully renovated in 2000. The wooden structure and also the copper covering was entirely replaced. The lower part of the copper structure is the 11 m (36 ft.) tall belfry. This section houses the bells of the cathedral, and it is enclosed by louvers made of copper. The belfry is topped by the eight columns of the lantern. The 2.5 m (8 ft.) tall columns determine the shape of the highest section of the steeple, the octagonal spire of the cathedral. On the top of the spire there is a 1 m diameter copper globe that works as a time capsule too. This globe holds the original list of the pilgrims to Rome in 1900, the names of the pilgrims who followed their ancestors on bikes one century later, and the list of town dwellers who donated for the renovation works of the cathedral. The globe is situated 48 m (157 ft.) high above the town, and it is holding a 2 m tall Greek Catholic cross.

=== Interior of the Cathedral ===
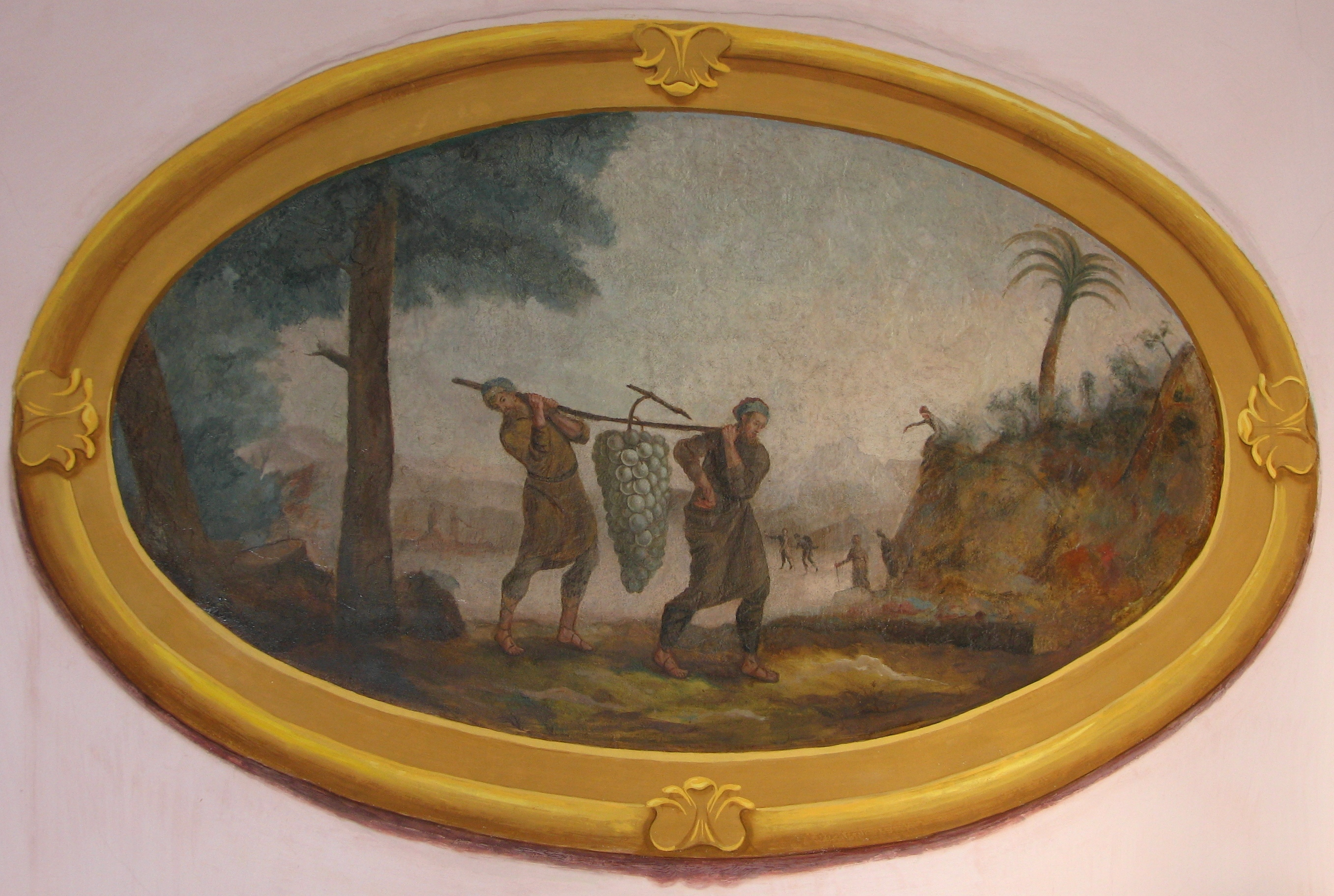
Secco of the Promised Land

==== The Altar ====
In the Byzantine rite the altar has a broader meaning. It does not only refer to the altar table, but the area surrounding it. In the Cathedral of Hajdúdorog the altar includes the sanctuary, the sacred place behind the iconostasis. The altar is the most important part of the church. It is situated on the eastern part of the building based on the traditions. The sanctuary is 7 m (23 ft.) wide and almost 10 m (33 ft.) tall. Its Eastern wall follows the semi-circular shape of the apse. On the western side the sanctuary is closed by the iconostasis. The entire floor of the altar has a 10 cm (4 inches) elevation compared to the level of the main nave. The elevation required a step between the sanctuary and the nave. This 10 cm red marble step can be found in front of the iconostasis, and its area is called soleas. There are three doors in the iconostasis that connect the altar and the main nave. These ornamented doors are only opened during holy service. There is another direct entrance to the altar from the sacristy, where the vestments and other sacred vessels are kept. Three large arched windows let the sun light to the sanctuary. One of them is in the apse, just in front of the altar table. The other two windows are on the Northern and Southern walls.

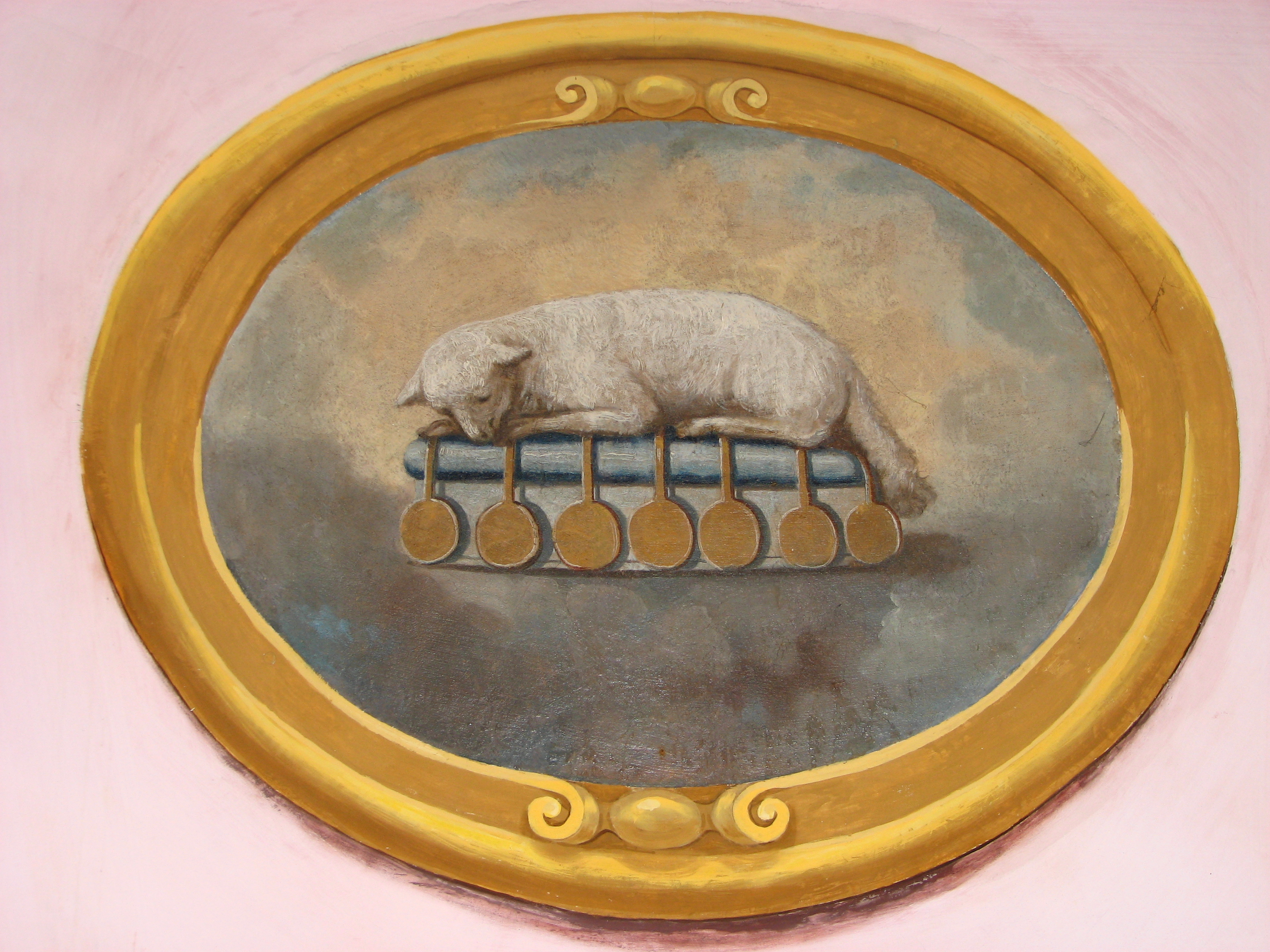
Agnus Dei secco in the sanctuary

The sanctuary has seven rather valuable seccos on its walls. The paintings were created by György Révész during the 1868 renovations, when the church was re-shaped in a Romantic style. One oval shaped mural can be found below and above each window, depicting scenes from the Old Testament. The sanctuary's seventh secco is the triangle shaped Eye of Providence painting which can't be seen from the altar. The only place where the secco is visible, is the organ gallery on the western side of the cathedral. The reason is that the Eye of Providence secco was painted to a wall surface high above the ground level of the altar, and it is parallel to the iconostasis, thus unseen from the sanctuary. The topic and the composition of the three upper seccos appear also on the Royal Doors of the iconostasis: The scene of Cain murders Abel is above the Northern window, the Noah's sacrifice secco is above the Southern window, and the Binding of Isaac scene was painted on the upper part of the apse. The seccos below the windows talk about stories from the Old Testament too, but instead of the upper sacrifice related murals, these are connected to divine prophecies. Below the Northern window, and above the entrance from the sacristy, is the mural of the Promised Land. It shows the land of Canaan, God's reward to Abraham and his descendants if they keep their faith. The lower secco of the Southern wall is called Brass Serpent, and it tells us the story of Moses who mounted a serpent of brass on a pole to cure the Israelites from the bite of the snakes. Later this story was explained in the Gospel of John as a reference to Jesus.

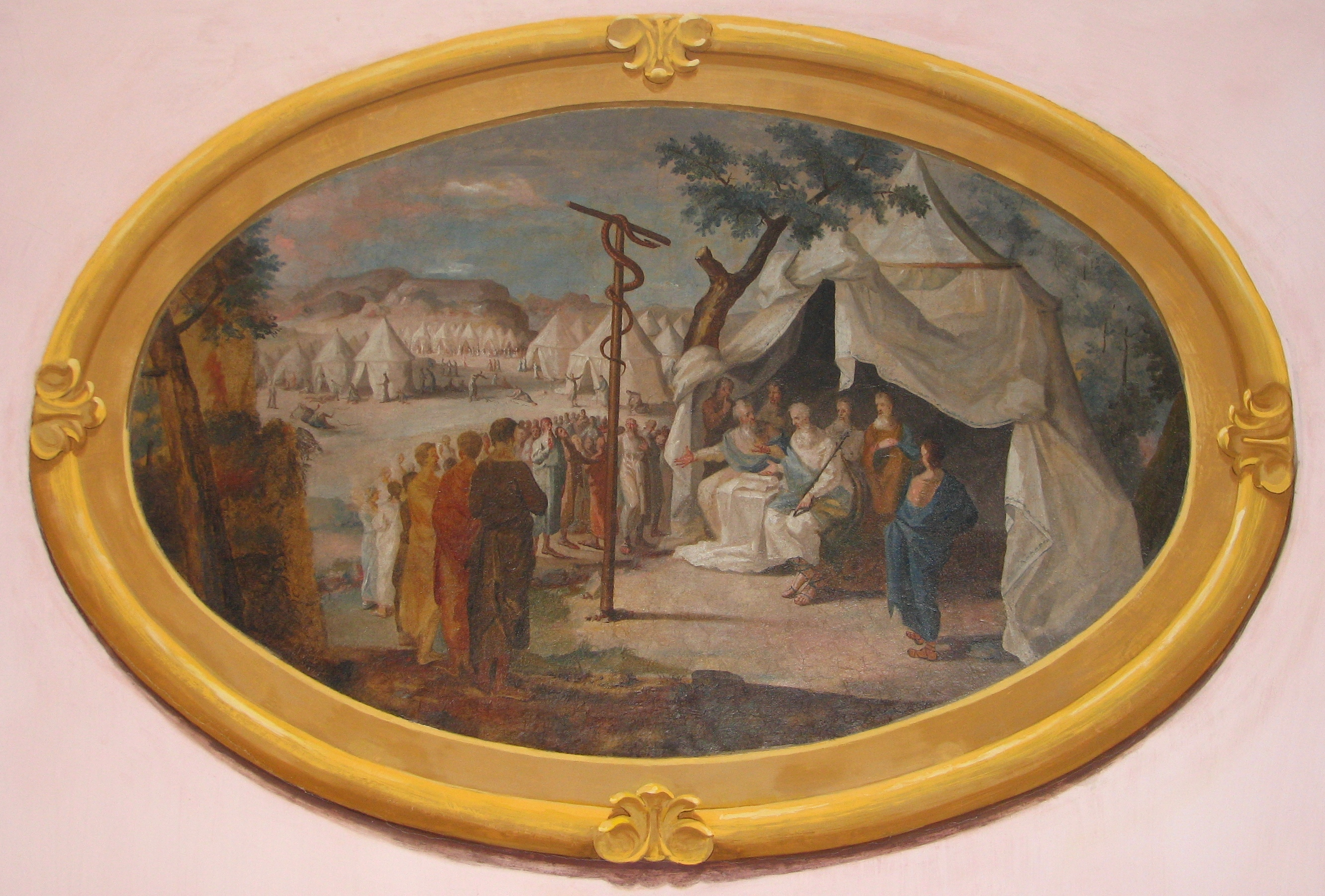
The secco of the Brass Serpent

The secco of the Agnus Dei was painted on the apse, to the most emphasized place, in front of the altar table. The lamb, symbolizing Jesus, is reposing on the Book of the Seven Seals known from the Book of Revelation. The priests, standing and praying at the altar table, are facing this mural. The lamb symbolizes the good shepherd, which is the duty of the priests; and it refers to the revelation too, reminding the priests to the importance of the strong faith.

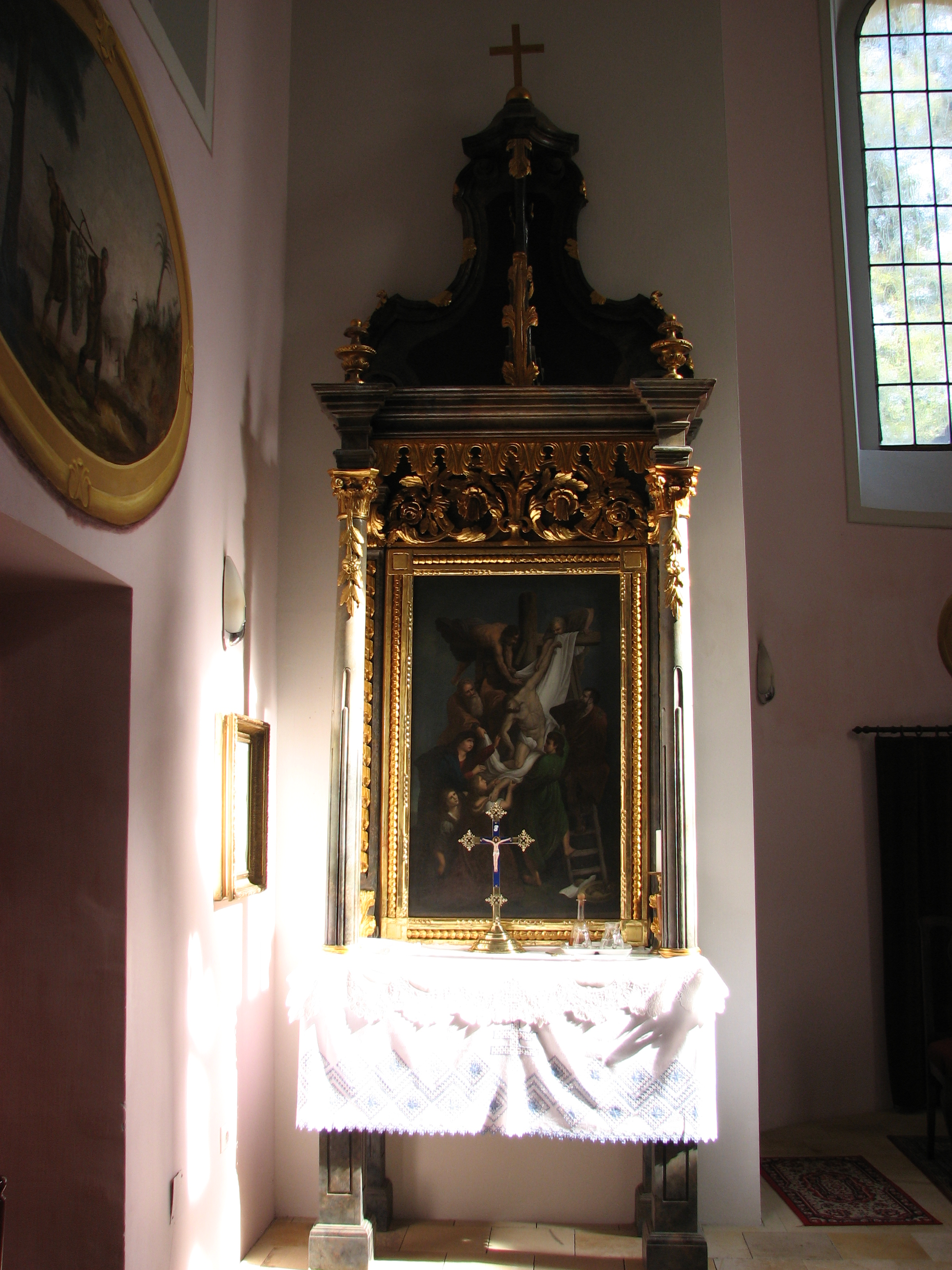
The side altar with Révész' Rembrandt replica, the Descent from the Cross

The central element of the sanctuary is the altar table with its carved baldachin. The parish hired Miklós Jankovits to make the original altar table in 1799. He finished all the carving works for the church within 2 years. This original structure was altered several times during the last 200 years. Today only the upper part of the baldachin remained from the original 18th-century altar table. Based on the report of the restorers, the original Jankovits altar probably had a much wider table, and the canopy was a bit shorter than it is today. The priest simply didn't have enough place in the sanctuary: the altar table was too large to walk around it. This problem resulted the first change of the altar in 1870. The carved foundations of the baldachin's columns were removed, and they were replaced by taller, but really simple, cuboid parts. To provide enough space for the priests, a new, smaller altar table was erected under the baldachin. The table was also turned around with its longer side parallel to the iconostasis. The result of this rearrangement was that the baldachin didn't really fit to the table itself, it was wider than needed. The parish solved this problem by the shortening of the volutes of the upper part of the baldachin. Small parts were sawed and removed from the arched top of the canopy. The re-tailored baldachin was now tall enough to let the altar table being elevated by some steps. The tabernacle of today's altar table was made originally for this smaller, second table. In 1872, by the end of the renovations, Révész' painting, the Last Supper was displayed on the main altar.

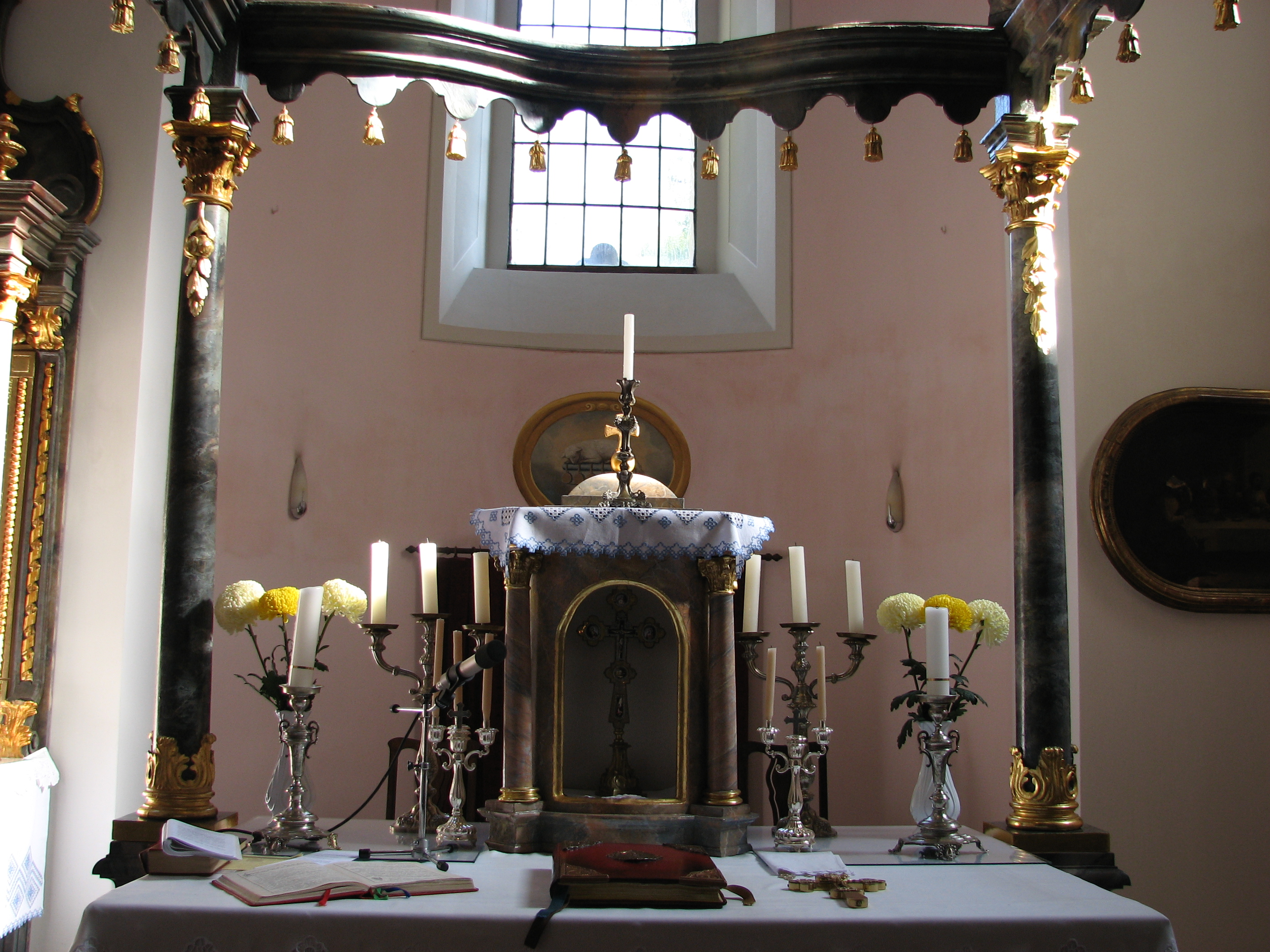
The main altar, its baldachin and the tabernacle

The main altar's major changes in the 18th century were followed by other smaller alterations in 1937. The cathedral was renovated and repainted for the Eucharistic Congress in Budapest, and since the work was paid and initiated by the Roman Catholic Church, the Latin motifs overwrote several Byzantine marks of the cathedral. The Last Supper was replaced by the Coronation of the Holy Virgin, a typical Latin scene, on the main altar. Two small wings were attached to the tabernacle, and the entire altar was repainted in white.

After the Second World War, during the years of the communist regime the church didn't have the funds or the support for any renovation works. The low quality 1937 restoration remained till the fall of the communism. During the long years the main altar got in a rather neglected shape. The truncated baldachin slowly fell to pieces. Its structure had to be supported by two iron rods to prevent from collapsing.
The main altar and the baldachin was fully restored in 2005. The major goal of the restorers was to re-create the 18th century Jankovits altar as much as possible. The original coloring of the altar was explored and restored again. The volutes of the baldachin gained back their original size, thus changing the width of the whole canopy. Györgyi Károlyi, the restorer of the main altar, studied other works of Jankovits (Serb Orthodox Church in Eger; Orthodox Church on Petőfi Square, Budapest and the Orthodox Church in Miskolc) to replace the missing parts of the altar. Károlyi had to create a new altar table and she had to replace the lower parts of the baldachin too. Today her altar is standing in the sanctuary of the cathedral. The altar table was made of oak, and it resembles to a robust marble table. Neither of the previous altar paintings got replaced to the table, only the tabernacle was restored. The foundations of the baldachin's columns were replaced along the guidelines of a committee of the Hungarian Institute of National Cultural Heritage. The committee chose a baldachin leg ending in animal claws, based on the analogy studies on Jankovits' other works. The new foundation and the old canopy was connected by long iron spines in the middle.

The side altar, also known as prothesis, is traditionally situated on the northern part of the sanctuary in the Byzantine rite churches. Priests prepare the bread and the wine on this smaller altar table for the holy liturgy. In the Cathedral of Hajdúdorog the prothesis was part of the original, early 19th century furniture made by Miklós Jankovits. It didn't go through major changes, like the main altar did. The parts above the altar table are original carvings. The table itself was changed probably in the 1870s. The arched volutes on the top of the prothesis are part of the original, Baroque structure. Two Corinthian columns hold the top structure of the prothesis, and they frame the painting of the side altar. The Descent from the Cross was painted by György Révész, approximately in 1870. He copied the composition of Rembrandt's 1634 master piece. The prothesis is ornated with typical Jankovits motifs. The gilded festoons, rose heads and acanthus leaves appear on the iconostasis and on other furniture too. The prothesis was over-painted with white oil paint during the Latinizing 1937 renovations. It was restored in 2005.

==== Iconostasis ====
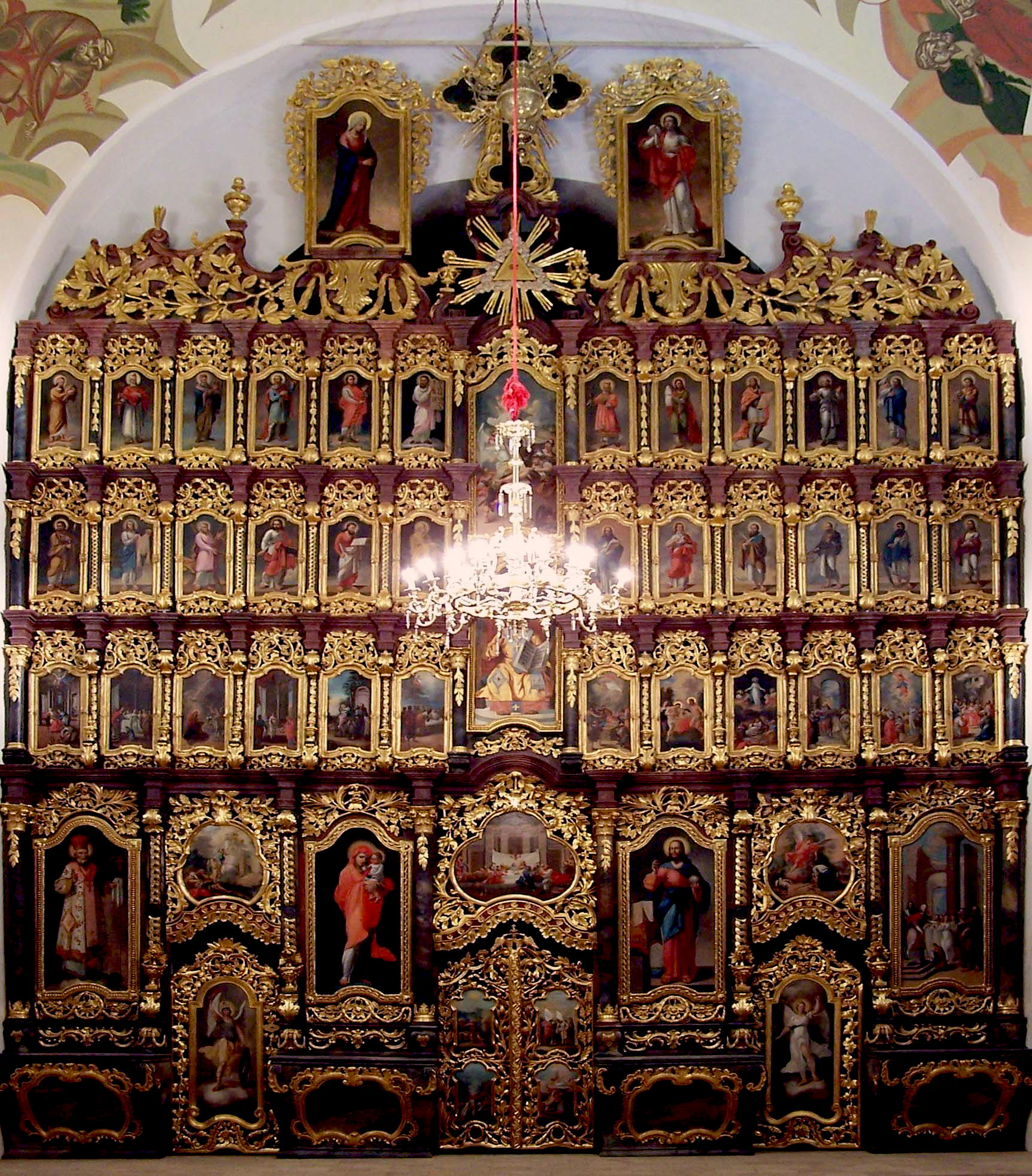
The iconostasis of the cathedral

The iconostasis is undoubtedly the most characteristic part of an Eastern Catholic church interior. The wall of icons is traditionally erected between the altar and the nave. The iconostasis of the Cathedral of Hajdúdorog is the largest Greek Catholic wall in Hungary. It is 11 m (36 ft.) tall and 7 m (23 ft.) wide, holding 54 icons on five tiers.

Hajdúdorog had the largest number of Greek Catholic inhabitants in the beginning of the 19th century in the Eparchy of Munkács, and by far the largest number of Hungarian speaking Greek Catholics. The parish, with the support of the town, decided to hire the most notable iconostase-carver master in the country to express this favored rank. Miklós Jankovits was hired by the Greek Catholic parish of Hajdúdorog in 1799 to carve the wooden framework, including the doors and the icon frames of the iconostasis. Mátyás Hittner and János Szűts could only start the painting and gilding works in 1808. The last icon was completed in 1816.

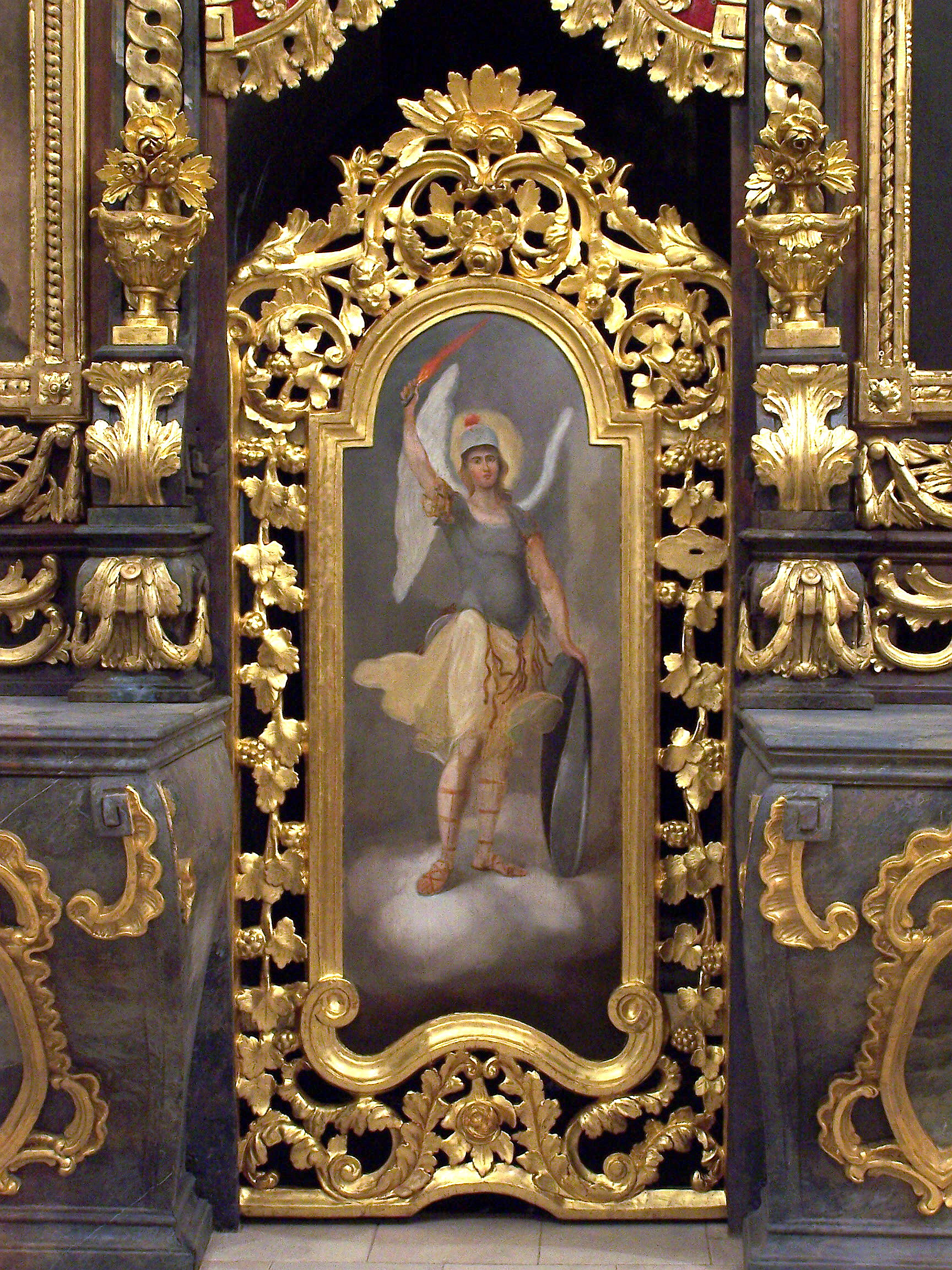
The icon of Michael Archangel on the Northern door of the iconostasis

The icons were painted clearly in Western style, quite unusual in Eastern rite churches. Instead of the traditional Byzantine iconographic depiction, the painters used the deep, rich colors, the intense light and dark shadows, and the eventful and realistic portrayal of late Baroque painting. The exact reason for turning towards the Western style is still disputed. However, Greek Catholicism by nature is closer to the Latin Rite, especially in 19th-century Hungary, where most of the population was Roman Catholic. Thus Western art and probably the Catholic rulers of the country, the Habsburgs, influenced the painters and the parish too.

While the structure of the iconostasis is based on Slavic tradition, it also displays a number of differences. Given Hungary's Roman Catholic majority, the artists who decorated Eastern rite churches usually either copied the style of a church in an Orthodox country or came from an Orthodox country themselves. Jankovits had Greek ancestors, but his icon screens were considered the only works with a style typical of Hungary. He combined several different styles. Rich, gilded ornaments, Zopf shapes of rose heads, tulips and Acanthus leaves characterize his work. Jankovits usually carved figures of animals on the top of the Royal Doors, clearly marking his style. In Hajdúdorog he added two ravens.
Another important difference is that the icons do not start from the floor level. Altarpieces, that were not part of the original structure, stand between the holy doors instead. And the lifelike portraits typical of Western style are seldom found on Eastern icon screens.

The iconostasis frames were slightly altered before the icons were completed. A local craftsman probably added the altarpieces between the doors. The icon screen underwent four renovations. The first affected only the so-called "Sovereign tier" in 1868. A few years later, in the 1870s the entire work was renovated by György Révész and his team. In the years preceding the 1938 34th Eucharistic Congress in Budapest, the Catholic Church undertook renovation work in churches throughout the country. In 1937 the iconostasis of Hajdúdorog was re-painted in a rather low artistic quality. Györgyi Károlyi and Csongor Bedő completed the latest renovation in 2002, restoring the original colors and compositions as far as they possibly could.

== See also ==
- List of cathedrals in Hungary

== Bibliography ==
Primary sources

- Sz. Kürti, Katalin (1989). Hajdúdorog, Görög Katolikus Székesegyház; a Tájak Korok Múzeumok Kiskönyvtára c. sorozat 329. száma. Veszprém: TKM Egyesület. ISBN 963-555-604-7.
- Berci, László (2001). Hajdúdorog Görög Katolikus Püspöki Székesegyház története (Művészettörténeti áttekintés). Budapest.
- Terdik Szilveszter (3 September 2010). "A hajdúdorogi ikonosztázionról". Byzantinohungarica. Archived from the original on 19 December 2013.
- Károlyi Györgyi; Bedő Csongor (2002). Hajdúdorog, Görög Katolikus Székesegyház ikonosztázion restaurálási dokumentációja. Budapest.
- Károlyi Györgyi (2001). Hajdúdorog, Görög Katolikus Székesegyház belső restaurálása. Budapest.

Secondary sources

- Csánki, Dezső (2002) [1890]. Magyarország történelmi földrajza a Hunyadiak korában I. kötet. Budapest: Arcanum Kiadó. ISBN 963-9374-36-9.
- Pásztor Bazil, ed. (2008). Hajdúdorogi Görög Katolikus Székesegyház (in Hungarian). Hajdúdorogi Görög Katolikus Székesegyház.
- Kniezsa, István (2001) [1943]. Kelet-Magyarország helynevei. Budapest: Lucidus Kiadó. ISBN 963861630X.
- Fejér, György (1832). Codex Diplomaticus Hungariae ecclesiasticus ac civilis, 8. kötet/1 (in Latin). Budae.
- Dercsényi, Balázs (1991). Katolikus templomok Magyarországon. Budapest: Hegyi & Társa Kiadó. ISBN 963-7592-00-8.
- Dudás László, ed. (1999). A Hajdúdorogi Főesperesi Levéltár iratainak lajstroma és mutatója 1562–1819 (PDF). Nyíregyháza: Görög Katolikus Püspöki Levéltár. ISBN 963-035133-1. Archived from the original (PDF) on 2 September 2014.
- Nagy, Márta (1994). Ortodox ikonosztázionok Magyarországon. Debrecen.
- Niessen, James (1994). "Hungarians and Romanians in Habsburg and Vatican diplomacy: The creation of the Diocese of Hajdúdorog in 1912" (PDF). The Catholic Historical Review. LXXX (2). Catholic University of America Press: 238–257. Archived from the original (PDF) on 5 January 2015.
- István Gulyás; Imréné Csomós. Ágoston Seidl (2000). Szakvélemény a hajdúdorogi Görög Katolikus Székesegyház utólagos falszigetelésének tárgyában. Budapest.
- József Végh; Zoltán Cserpák (1999). Székesegyház felújításáról építési engedélyezési tervdokumentáció. Budapest.
- Irén Pappné Papp; Györgyné Galamb, eds. (2000) [1901]. Emlékkönyv a Görög Szert. Katholikus Magyarok Római Zarándoklatáról. Hajdúböszörmény: Hajdúdorogi Mészáros Károly Városi Könyvtár. ISBN 963-00-2456-X.
- Tamás Véghseő. "A Hajdúdorogi Egyházmegye rövid története". Diocese of Hajdúdorog.
- Galambvári, Péter (June 2009). "Örömünnep Hajdúdorogon". 20 éve újra város Hajdúdorog. Hajdúdorog Város önkormányzatának: 2–3.
- Véghseő, Tamás; Terdik Szilveszter (2012). "...minden utamat már előre láttad" Görögkatolikusok Magyarországon. Strasbourg: Éditions du Signe. ISBN 978-2-7468-2774-5.
- Володимир, Ярема (1994). Символіка церковного інтерєру. Дивний світ ікон. Lviv.
- dr. Orosz, Erika (2009). "Városnapi különszám, 20 éves a városunk". Hajdúdorogi Újság. XVIII. ISSN 1216-0628.
- Dalanics, Zoltán (2010). "Ereklyék a Hajdúdorogi Székesegyházban". Hajdúdorogi Újság. XIX.. ISSN 1216-0628.
- György Györffy; Tamás Katona; Tibor Klaniczay; Béla Stoll; Ferenc Szakály, eds. (1988) [1849]. A magyarországi hadjárat 1849. Orosz szemtanúk a magyar szabadságharcról. Budapest: Európa könyvkiadó. ISBN 963-07-4541-0.
- Compu-Tik (27 January 2011). "Antik órák, zsebórák, óraszerkezetek". Index Fórum.
- Károlyi Györgyi (2005). Hajdúdorog, Görög Katolikus Székesegyház főoltár restaurálási dokumentációja. Budapest.
- Véghseő, Tamás; Terdik, Szilveszter; Kocsis, Fülöp (2012). "...minden utamat már előre láttad" Görögkatolikusok Magyarországon. Strasbourg: Éditions du Signe. ISBN 978-2-7468-2774-5.
- Deák, Klára (1992). Főrestaurátori szakvélemény a hajdúdorogi görög katolikus templom ikonosztázáról. Budapest.
