= Miklós Dudás =

Miklós Dudás may refer to:

- Miklós Dudás (bishop) (1902–1972), Hungarian Greek Catholic bishop
- Miklós Dudás (canoeist) (1991–2026), Hungarian sprint canoeist
