= Hungarian Catholic Eparchy of Miskolc =

Eastern Catholic eparchy in Hungary

Coordinates: 48.1066°N 20.7904°E

Diocese of Miskolc Dioecesis Miskolcensis Miskolci egyházmegye
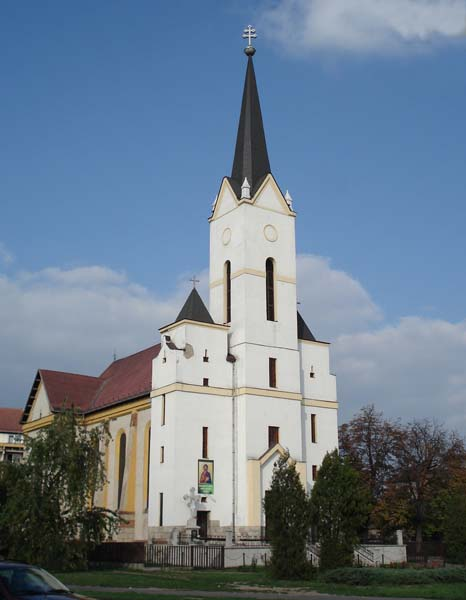
- Cathedral of the diocese

Location
- Country: Hungary
- Ecclesiastical province: Hungarian Greek Catholic Church
- Metropolitan: sui iuris
- Population: 50,000

Information
- Rite: Byzantine Rite
- Cathedral: Cathedral of the Assumption in Miskolc

Current leadership
- Pope: Leo XIV
- Bishop: Atanáz Orosz
- Metropolitan Archbishop: Péter Fülöp Kocsis

Map
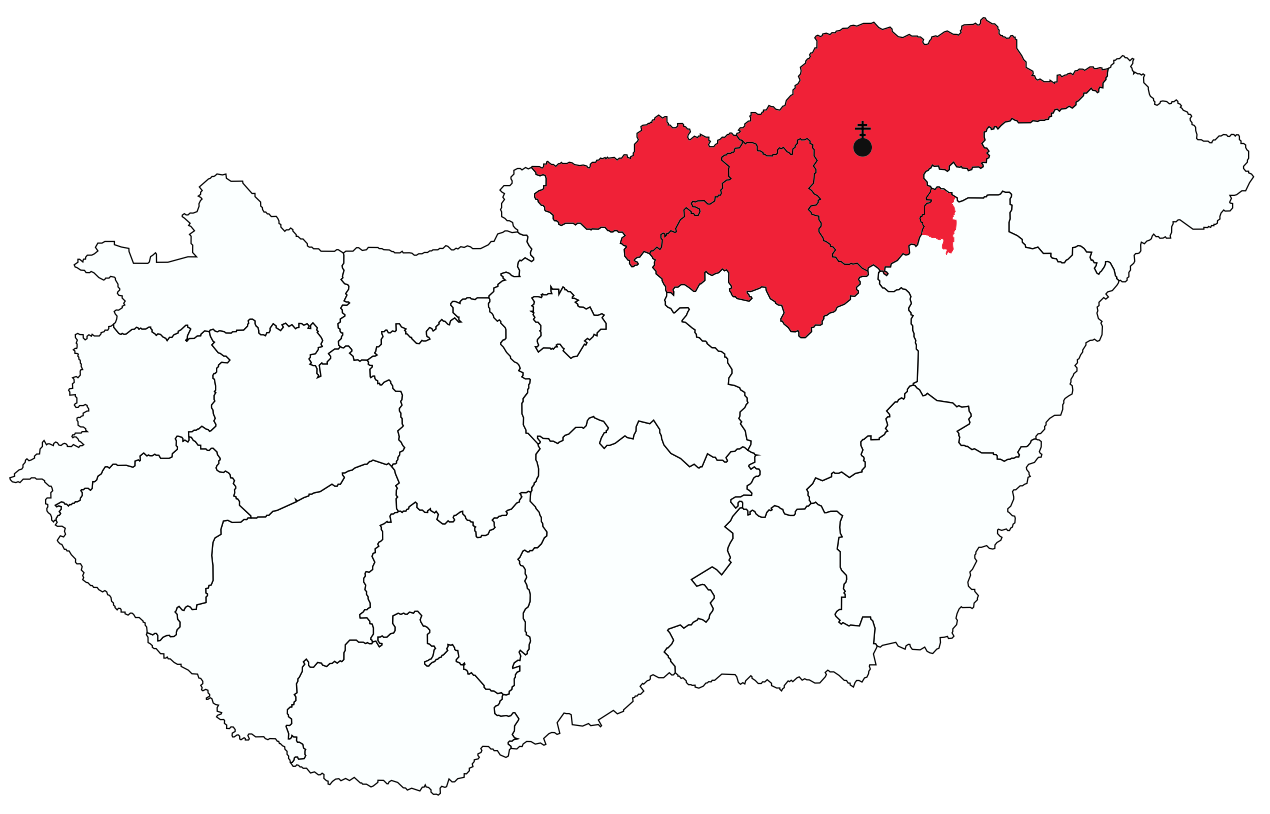
- Territory of the Eparchy of Miskolc

Website
- Website

The Eparchy of Miskolc (Latin Dioecesis Miskolcensis) is an eparchy (diocese) of the Hungarian Greek Catholic Church which is a particular church sui iuris of the Catholic Church. It uses the Byzantine Rite in the Hungarian language in its liturgical services.

It is a suffragan diocese of the Archeparchy of Hajdúdorog which is a sui iuris metropolis of the Church that covers the entire country of Hungary. It depends on the Roman Congregation for the Oriental Churches.

The cathedral church of the eparchy is the Cathedral of the Assumption ("Nagyboldogasszony püspöki székesegyház"), in the city of Miskolc in north-eastern Hungary.

== History ==
- It was established on 4 June 1924 as the Apostolic Exarchate of Miskolc. In Eastern Catholic Churches, an Apostolic Exarchate is a missionary, pre-diocesan jurisdiction that is comparable to a Latin Apostolic Prefecture. In this case, it is closer to an Apostolic Vicariate as all incumbents held titular sees). It consisted of the 21 Rusyn parishes formerly in the diocese of Prešov that remained in Hungarian territory after Czechoslovakia was created. They were provided with a distinct identity because they used Slavonic in the liturgy. By the 1940s, however, they had all begun to use Hungarian.
- On 5 March 2011 it gained territory from what was then the Eparchy of Hajdúdorog.
- On 20 March 2015 it was elevated to an eparchy and became a suffragan of the Metropolitan Archeparchy of Hajdúdorog.

== Episcopal Hierarchs ==
Apostolic Exarchs of Miskolc

- Antal Papp (1924.07.14 – 1945.12.24) (born Ukraine), Titular Archbishop of Cyzicus (1924.07.14 – 1945.12.24); previously Titular Bishop of Lyrba (1912.04.29 – 1912.06.02) & Coadjutor Eparch of Mukacheve of the Ruthenians (Ukraine) (1912.04.29 – 1912.06.02), succeeding as Eparch (Bishop) of Mukacheve of the Ruthenians (1912.06.02 – 1924.07.14)
- Miklós Dudás, Basilian Order of Saint Josaphat (O.S.B.M.) (1946.10.14 – 1972.07.15), while Eparch (Bishop) of Hajdúdorog of the Hungarians (Hungary) (1939.03.25 – 1972.07.15)
- Imre Timkó (1975.01.07 – 1988.03.30), while Eparch of Hajdúdorog of the Hungarians (Hungary) (1975.01.07 – 1988.03.30)
- Szilárd Keresztes (1988.06.30 – 2007.11.10), while Bishop of Hajdúdorog of the Hungarians (Hungary) (1988.06.30 – 2007.11.10); previously Titular Bishop of Chunavia (1975.01.07 – 1988.06.30) & Auxiliary Eparch of Hajdúdorog of the Hungarians (Hungary) (1975.01.07 – 1988.06.30); later Apostolic Administrator of Hajdúdorog of the Hungarians (2007.11.10 – 2008.05.02)
- Apostolic Administrator Péter Fülöp Kocsis (2008.05.02 – 2011.03.05), while Eparch of Hajdúdorog of the Hungarians (Hungary) (2008.05.02 – 2015.03.20), later promoted its first Archeparch (Metropolitan of Hajdúdorog of the Hungarians) (2015.03.20 – ...), President of Council of the Hungarian Church (2015.03.20 – ...)
- Atanáz Orosz (2011.03.05 – 2015.03.20 see below), Titular Bishop of Panium (2011.03.05 – 2015.03.20)

Suffragan Eparchs (Bishops) of Miskolc

- Atanáz Orosz (see above 2015.03.20 – ...), also Apostolic Administrator of Nyíregyháza of the Hungarians (Hungary) (2015.03.20 – 2015.10.31).

== Statistics and extent ==
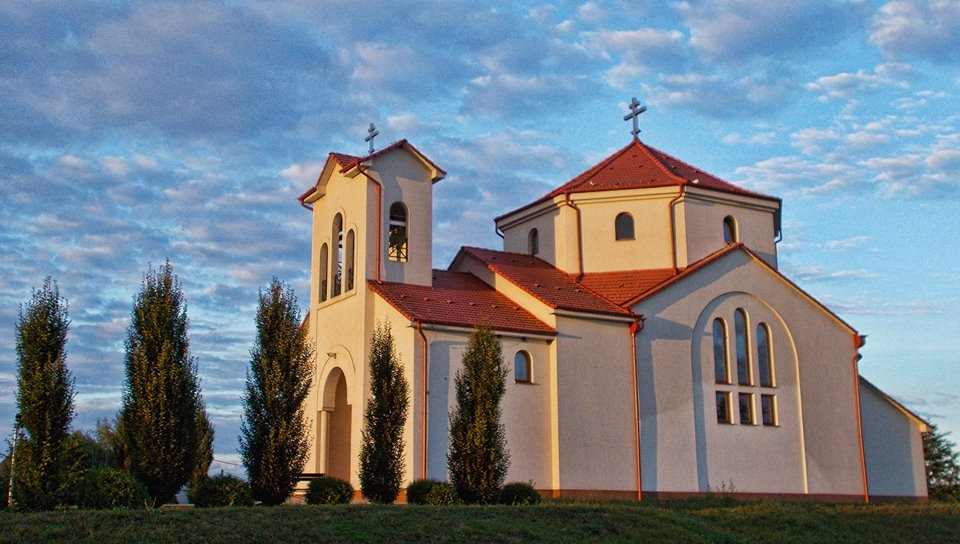
St. Andrew Greek Catholic Church of Szirma

As per 2014, it pastorally served 51,100 Hungarian (Byzantine rite) Catholics in 62 parishes and 10 missions with 71 priests (diocesan) and 21 seminarians.

The eparchy covers three Hungarian comitat (counties) : Borsod-Abaúj-Zemplén, Heves and Nógrád, plus part of Hajdúnánás.

Since 2012, the then exarchate include 59 parishes (in Hungarian : parókia) grouped in six vicariates : Abod, Edelény, Irota, Kazincbarcika, Múcsony, Ózd, Rakaca, Rakacaszend, Sajószentpéter, Szuhakálló, Viszló, Baktakék, Csobád, Encs, Felsővadász, Gadna, Garadna, Homrogd, Kány, Mogyoróska, Pere, Selyeb, Szikszó, Abaújszántó, Baskó, Bekecs, Bodrogkeresztúr, Bodrogolaszi, Boldogkőváralja, Komlóska, Mezőzombor, Szerencs, Tokaj, Tolcsva, Miskolc-Avas, Miskolc (-Belváros), Miskolc-Diósgyőr, Miskolc-Görömböly, Miskolc-Szirma, Arnót, Berzék, Eger, Emőd, Felsőzsolca, Hejőkeresztúr, Sajópálfala, Sajópetri, Sajóvámos, Szirmabesenyő, Tiszaújváros, Alsóregmec, Dámóc, Filkeháza, Kenézlő, Mikóháza, Pácin, Rudabányácska, Sárospatak, Sárospatak-Végardó, Sátoraljaújhely, Vajdácska and Zemplénagárd.

== See also ==
- List of Catholic dioceses in Hungary

== Sources and external links ==
- GigaCatholic, with Google satellite photo - data for all sections
