= Julije Drohobeczky =

Catholic Bishop

- Titular Bishop of Polybotus
- Native name: Юлій Дрогобецький
- Church: Greek Catholic Church of Croatia and Serbia
- See: Titular See of Polybotus
- In office: 18 May 1917 – 11 February 1934
- Predecessor: Position established
- Successor: Auguste Sieffert
- Previous post: Bishop of Križevci (1891-1917)

Orders
- Ordination: 27 March 1881 by Ivan Pasteliy
- Consecration: 11 July 1892 by Yuliy Firtsak

Personal details
- Born: 5 November 1853 near Uzhhorod, Kingdom of Hungary, Austrian Empire
- Died: 11 February 1934 (aged 80) Strmac Pribićki, Sava Banovina, Kingdom of Yugoslavia

Julije Drohobeczky (Ukrainian: Юлій Дрогобецький; 5 November 1853 – 11 February 1934) was a Ruthenian and Croatian Greek Catholic hierarch. He was the bishop from 1891 to 1917 (in fact – until 1914) of the Eastern Catholic Eparchy of Križevci. From 1917 he was the titular bishop of Polybotus.

Greek Catholic bishops at the Coronation of Charles IV of Hungary, 1916. First row: István Miklósy, Antal Papp; third row: Valeriu Traian Frențiu, Demetriu Radu; last row: Julije Drohobeczky

Born in Gany, near Uzhhorod, Austrian Empire (present day – Ukraine) in 1853, he was ordained a priest on 27 March 1881 for the Ruthenian Catholic Eparchy of Mukacheve. Fr. Drohobeczky was active in popular education and local politic in Zakarpattia.

He was confirmed as the Bishop by the Holy See on 17 December 1891. He was consecrated to the Episcopate on 26 May 1892. The principal consecrator was Bishop Yuliy Firtsak and co-consecrators were Bishop Ján Vályi and Bishop Mihail Pavel.

He died in Strmac Pribićki, Kingdom of Yugoslavia (present day – Croatia) on 11 February 1934.

Catholic Church titles
Preceded by Ilija Hranilović	Eastern Catholic Bishop of Križevci; 1891–1917	Succeeded by Dionisije Njaradi (as Ap. Administrator)
