= Archeparchy of Hajdúdorog =

Eastern Catholic archeparchy in Hungary

Archeparchy of Hajdúdorog Archidioecesis Haidudoroghensis Hajdúdorogi Főegyházmegye

Catholic
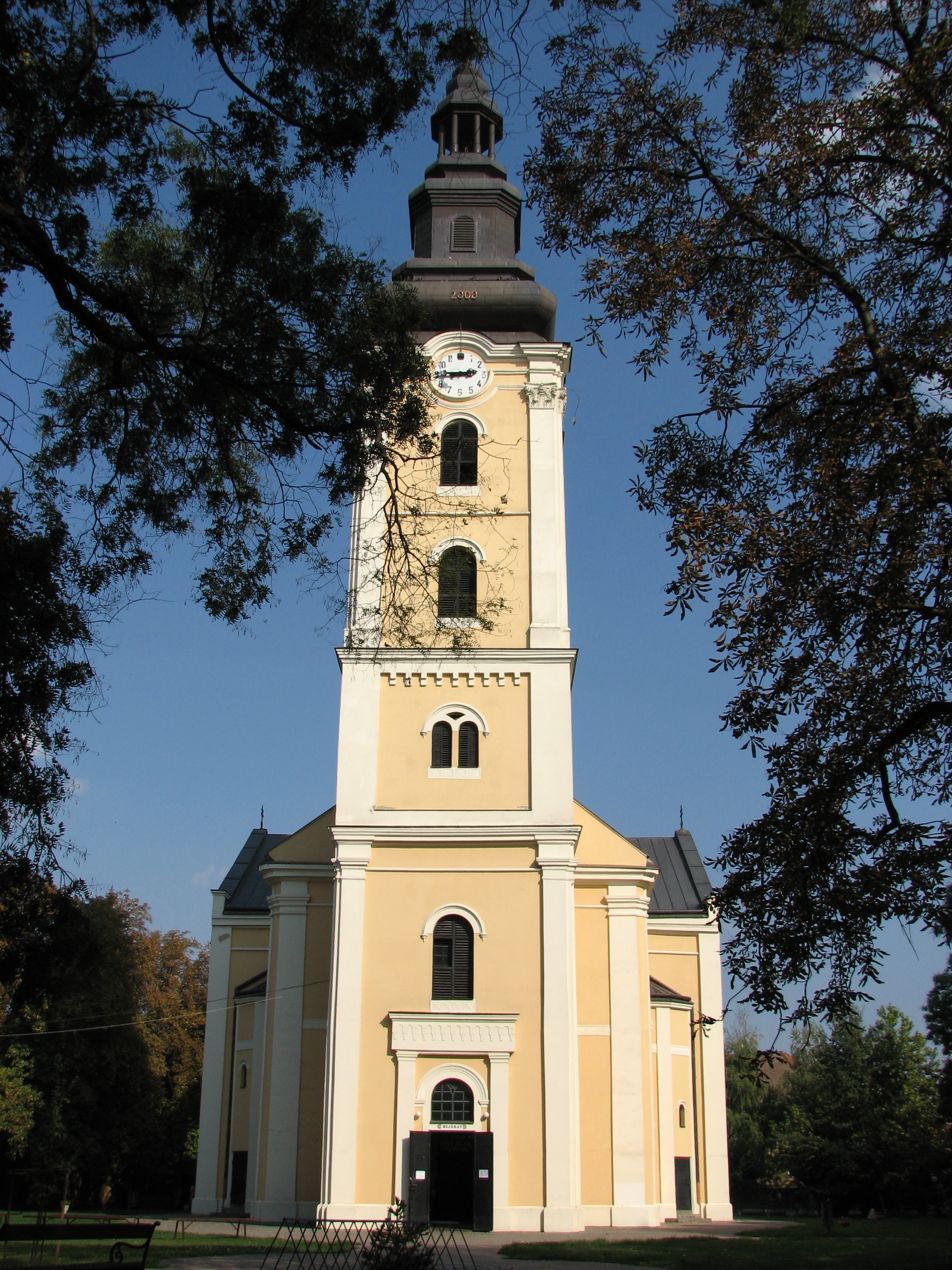
- Hajdúdorog Cathedral

Location
- Country: Hungary
- Metropolitan: Metropolitan see sui iuris of Hajdúdorog

Statistics
- Area: 73,341 km^{2} (28,317 sq mi)
- Population: Total; Catholics: (as of 2011); 8,207,275; 197,501 (2.4%)

Information
- Denomination: Catholic Church
- Sui iuris church: Hungarian Greek Catholic Church
- Rite: Byzantine Rite
- Cathedral: Cathedral of the Presentation of Mary

Current leadership
- Pope: Leo XIV
- Metropolitan Archbishop: Péter Fülöp Kocsis

Map
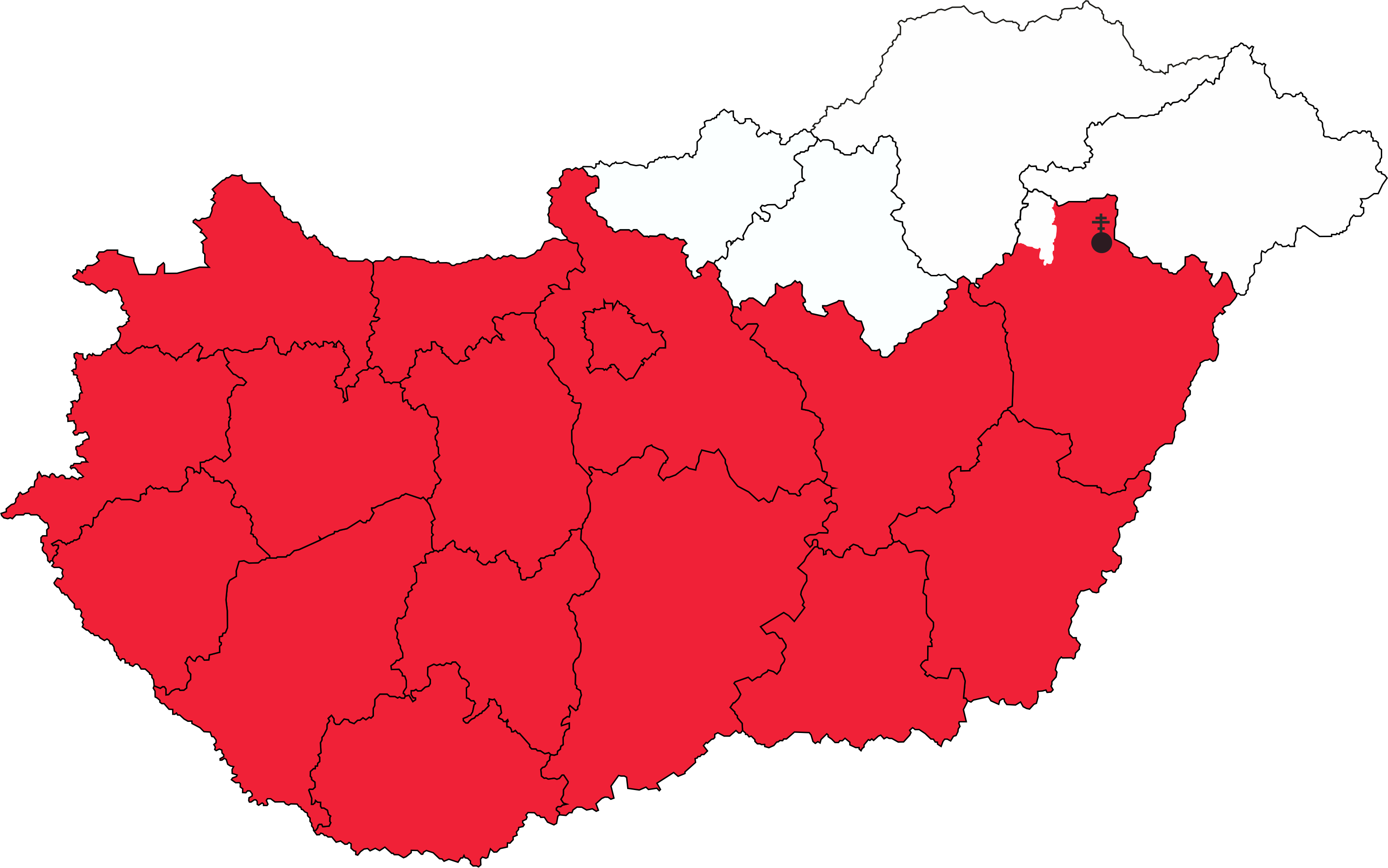
- Territory of the Archeparchy of Hajdudorog, excluding the Eparchy of Miskolc and Eparchy of Nyiregyhaza

Website
- Website

The Archeparchy of Hajdúdorog (Latin: Archidioecesis Haidudoroghensis) is a Hungarian Greek Catholic archeparchy of the Catholic Church that is in full communion with the Holy See. The archeparchy is the metropolitan see of its ecclesiastical province which covers the whole of Hungary. The archeparch (equivalent to an archbishop in the Latin Church) is also, ex officio, the metropolitan bishop of the metropolis. The cathedral church of the archeparchy is the Cathedral of the Presentation of Mary in the city of Hajdúdorog.

== History ==
On 8 June 1912, it was established as Eparchy (Eastern Catholic diocese) of Hajdúdorog, on territory formerly belonging to the Metropolitan Archeparchy of Făgăraș and Alba Iulia, the Greek Catholic Archeparchy of Prešov, the Latin Metropolitan Archdiocese of Esztergom (Hungary), the Eparchies of Gherla, Armenopoli and Szamos-Ujvár, Mukachevo and Oradea Mare.

According to Austro-Hungarian authorities, a bomb sent by Ilie Cătărău exploded on 23 February 1914 at the palace of the new Eparchy of Hajdúdorog; 3 people were killed and over 20 wounded.

On 9 April 1934, the eparchy lost territory to Metropolitanate sui juris of Făgăraş and Alba Iulia and Eparchies of Maramureş and Oradea Mare (in Romania) and on 5 March 2011 lost more territory to the pre-existing, also Hungarian (Greek) Catholic Apostolic Exarchate of Miskolc.

On 20 March 2015, it was elevated to Archeparchy and Metropolitanate sui juris, with two simultaneously created suffragan Eparchies comprised in its new province:

- the Eparchy of Nyíregyháza (Hungarian Greek Catholic Church), split from Hajdúdorog's former territory
- the Eparchy of Miskolc, promoting the former Apostolic Exarchate of Miskolc to diocesan rank.

== Special churches ==
- Cathedral : Istenszülő templomba vezetése Görög katolikus székesegyház, in Hajdúdorog
- Minor Basilica : Görög Katolikus Lelkészi Hivatal Kegytemplom, in Máriapócs, Szabolcs-Szatmár-Bereg

== List of eparchs ==
Eparchs (Bishops) of Hajdúdorog (Byzantine Rite)

- Antal Papp (1912 – 1913), Apostolic Administrator
- István Miklósy (23 June 1913 – 30 October 1937)
- Miklós Dudás, O.S.B.M. (25 March 1939 – 15 July 1972)
- Imre Timkó (7 January 1975 – 30 March 1988)
- Szilárd Keresztes (30 June 1988 – 10 November 2007; previously Auxiliary Bishop and Titular Bishop of Chunavia 7 January 1975 – 30 June 1988)
- the above Szilárd Keresztes as Apostolic Administrator 10 November 2007 – 5 February 2008)
- Bishop Péter Fülöp Kocsis (5 February 2008 – 20 March 2015 - see below)

Archeparchs (Archbishops) of Hajdúdorog (Byzantine Rite)

- Archbishop Péter Fülöp Kocsis (see above - 20 March 2015 – present)

== See also ==
- Roman Catholicism in Hungary

== Sources and external links ==
- GCatholic.org, with biography links from incumbent (arch)bishops
- Catholic Hierarchy
- Véghseő Tamás: Our Paths. Byzantine Rite Catholics in Hungary
