= Antal Papp =

Hungarian Eastern Catholic priest

Apostolic Exarchate of Miskolc
- Apostolic Exarch of Miskolc
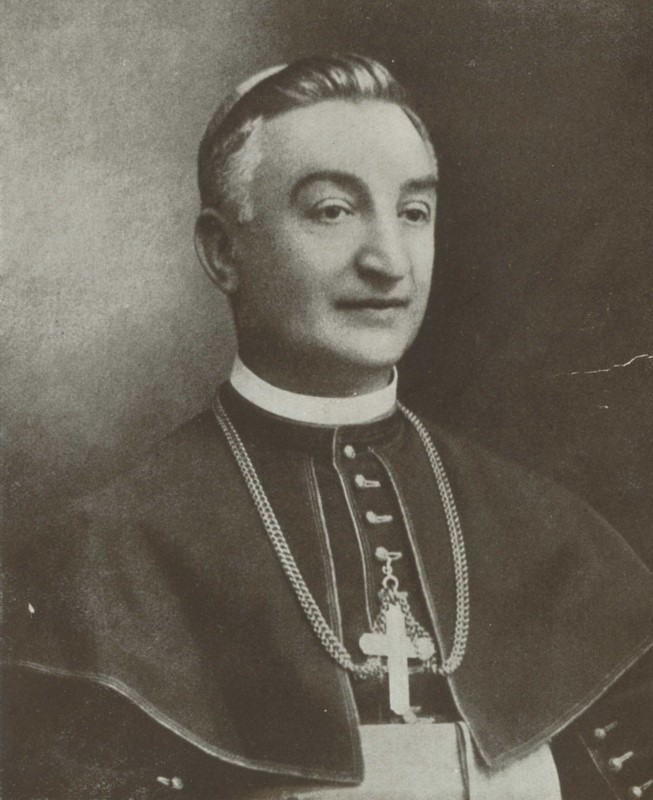
- Church: Hungarian Greek Catholic Church
- Archdiocese: Apostolic Exarchate of Miskolc
- In office: 14 July 1924 – 24 December 1945
- Predecessor: Position established
- Successor: Atanáz Orosz
- Other post: Titular Archbishop of Cyzicus (1924-1945)
- Previous posts: Bishop of Mukachevo (1912-1924); Apostolic Administrator of Hajdúdorog (1912-1913)Titular Bishop of Lyrbe (1912); Coadjutor Bishop of Mukachevo (1912)

Orders
- Ordination: 24 December 1893 by Yuliy Firtsak
- Consecration: 14 October 1912 by Julije Drohobeczky

Personal details
- Born: 17 November 1867 Nagykálló, Kingdom of Hungary, Transleithania, Austria-Hungary
- Died: 24 December 1945 (aged 78) Miskolc, Kingdom of Hungary

Antal Papp (17 November 1867 – 24 December 1945) was a Ruthenian and Hungarian Greek Catholic hierarch. He was bishop of the Ruthenian Catholic Eparchy of Mukacheve from 1912 to 1924, Apostolic Administrator of the new created Hungarian Greek Catholic Eparchy of Hajdúdorog from 1912 to 1913 and Apostolic Administrator of Apostolic Exarchate of Miskolc from 1924 to 1945 as titular archbishop of Cyzicus.

Greek Catholic bishops at the Coronation of Charles IV of Hungary, 1916. First row: István Miklósy, Antal Papp; third row: Valeriu Traian Frențiu, Demetriu Radu; last row: Julije Drohobeczky

Born in Nagykálló, Austria-Hungary in 1867, he was ordained a priest on 24 December 1893. He was appointed the Bishop by the Holy See on 29 April 1912. He was consecrated to the Episcopate on 14 October 1912. The principal consecrator was Bishop Julije Drohobeczky, and the principal co-consecrators were Bishop József Lányi de Késmark and Bishop Győző Horváth. Bishop Papp was elevated as titular archbishop of Cyzicus on 14 July 1924.

He died in Miskolc on 24 December 1945.

Catholic Church titles
Preceded by Yuliy Firtsak	Ruthenian Catholic Bishop of Mukacheve; 1912–1924	Succeeded by Petro Hebey
New title	Hungarian Catholic Eparchy of Hajdúdorog; 1912–1913 (as Apostolic Administrator)	Succeeded by István Miklósy
New title	Apostolic Exarchate of Miskolc; 1924–1945 (as Apostolic Administrator)	Succeeded by Miklós Dudás
