= István Miklósy =

Hungarian Greek Catholic hierarch

- Eparch of Hajdúdorog
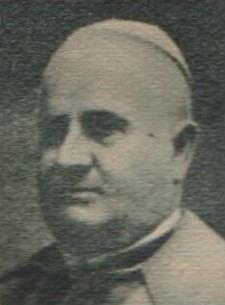
- Church: Hungarian Greek Catholic Church
- Diocese: Eparchy of Hajdúdorog
- In office: 23 June 1913 – 29 October 1937
- Predecessor: Eparchy erected
- Successor: Miklós Dudás

Orders
- Ordination: 17 April 1884 by Ivan Pasteliy
- Consecration: 5 October 1913 by Julije Drohobeczky

Personal details
- Born: 22 August 1857 Rákóc, Zemplén County, Kingdom of Hungary, Austrian Empire
- Died: 29 October 1937 (aged 80) Nyíregyháza, Szabolcs–Ung County, Kingdom of Hungary

István Miklósy (22 August 1857 – 29 October 1937) was a Hungarian Greek Catholic hierarch. He was the first eparchial bishop of the Hungarian Greek Catholic Eparchy of Hajdúdorog from 1913 to 1937.

Born in Rakovec nad Ondavou, Austria-Hungary (present day – Slovakia) in 1857, he was ordained a priest on 17 April 1884, appointed the Bishop by the Holy See on 23 June 1913. He was consecrated to the Episcopate on 5 October 1913. The principal consecrator was Bishop Julije Drohobeczky, and the principal co-consecrators were Bishop Augustín Fischer-Colbrie and Bishop József Lányi de Késmark.

Greek Catholic bishops at the Coronation of Charles IV of Hungary, 1916. First row: István Miklósy, Antal Papp; third row: Valeriu Traian Frențiu, Demetriu Radu; last row: Julije Drohobeczky

He died in Nyíregyháza on 29 October 1937.

Catholic Church titles
Preceded by Antal Papp (as Apostolic Administrator)	Hungarian Catholic Bishop of Hajdúdorog; 1913–1937	Succeeded by Miklós Dudás
