= Szilárd Keresztes =

Hungarian Greek Catholic bishop (1932–2025)

- Eparch of Hajdúdorog
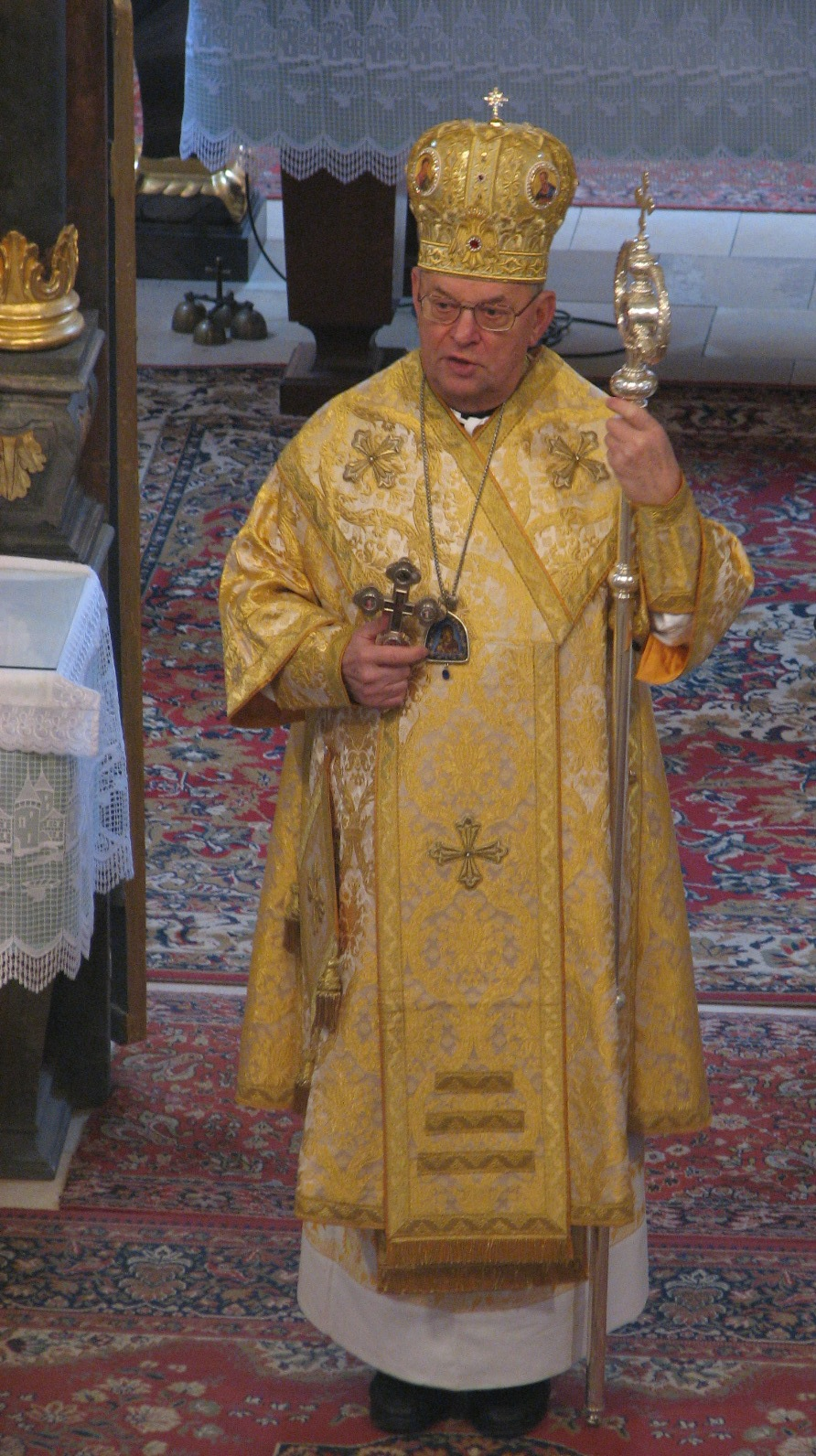
- Church: Hungarian Greek Catholic Church
- Diocese: Eparchy of Hajdúdorog
- In office: 30 June 1988 – 10 November 2007
- Predecessor: Imre Timkó
- Successor: Péter Fülöp Kocsis
- Other post: Apostolic Administrator of Miskolc (1988-2007)
- Previous post: Titular Eparch of Chunavia (1975-1988)Auxiliary Eparch of Hajdúdorog (1975-1988)

Orders
- Ordination: 7 August 1955 by Miklós Dudás
- Consecration: 8 February 1975 by Imre Timkó

Personal details
- Born: 19 July 1932 Nyíracsád, Szabolcs–Ung County, Kingdom of Hungary
- Died: 13 August 2025 (aged 93) Nyíregyháza, Szabolcs–Szatmár–Bereg County, Hungary

Szilárd Keresztes (19 July 1932 – 13 August 2025) was a Hungarian Greek Catholic bishop. He was Bishop of Hajdúdorog and apostolic administrator of the Apostolic Exarchate of Miskolc from 1975 to 2008.

== Early life ==
Keresztes was born in Nyíracsád, Hungary on 19 July 1932. He studied philosophy and theology between 1950 and 1955 at the Greek Catholic Major Seminary of Nyíregyháza. He was ordained priest by Bishop Miklós Dudás OSBM of Hajdúdorog in 1955. He earned a doctorate in sacred theology in 1957 at the Pázmány Péter Academy of Theology in Budapest. He served as parish pastor in Kispest, Budapest from 1957 to 1960. Between 1960 and 1970 he was associate pastor and chanter in Nyíregyháza, where he also taught philosophy, dogmatic theology and catechetics. In 1966 he won a scholarship to study at the Pontifical Oriental Institute in Rome, Italy as a student of the Pontifical Hungarian Institute for three years, where he obtained a licentiate in eastern theology. In 1970 he was made a canon of the Cathedral of Hajdúdorog, in 1975 parish administrator in Nyíregyháza.

== Bishop ==
On 10 January 1975, Pope Paul VI appointed him titular bishop and on 8 February 1975, dr. Imre Timkó consecrated him in Nyíregyháza and Szeged Cserháti Joseph Joachim bishop of Pécs assistants. From 1975 to 1988 he was assistant bishop vicar of Budapest and in Miskolc he was the Apostolic Vicar General Governorship. From 1984 until 1988 in the Eastern Kódexrevíziós Pontifical Commission he worked. Between 1987-1988 was rector of the Roman Pontifical Institute of Hungary. On 30 June 1988, Pope John Paul II named him Hajdúdorog diocesan bishop and Apostolic Exarchate of Miskolc. On 28 February 2000 he celebrated an anniversary of his consecration as a bishop. Pope John Paul II greeted him by a personal letter.

== Professional offices ==
- 1988-1990 Committee member of the Pontifical Oriental Kódexrevíziós.
- 1989-94 to the members of the Congregation for Eastern Churches.
- 11 September 2000, from the immigrants and members of the Pontifical Council Útonlevők.
- By 2008, the Hungarian Catholic Bishops' Conference Committee for Migration and the Economic Commission chairman.

== Educational institutions founded ==
Saint Nicholas Nursery School, Nyíregyháza

The St. Nicholas was founded in 1990 kindergarten Cross Solid Hajdúdorog bishop Nyíregyháza. The preparations, after the state returned music school building (Bethlen G Street) started its activities in the kindergarten in September 1996. Then the bishop in May 2004 devoted the new building (Whistle Street), with effect from 1 September to kindergarten there.

Greek Catholic Education Centre, Hajdúdorog

Solid Cross in June 1991 the Greek Catholic Grammar School founded by the Basilian monks run by, established in 1942 Hajdúdorog Hungarian Greek Catholic Fiúlíceum Cantor and Teacher-Training Institute site. By 1998, the old monastery was built around the building complex which houses the education building, a chapel and school house. From 1 September 2006, Greek Catholic Education Centre operates under the name of the institution

Saint Nicholas Nursery, Miskolc

Miskolc Greek Catholic Primary School

Újfehértó Greek Catholic Preschool

== Formal and social distinctions ==
The Hungarian Government "Award for Minorities" (1996)

Hajdúdorog Freeman of the City (1996)

The Hungarian Order of Merit Cross (1997)

Bocskai Award (2000)

Tolerance Award (2004)

Pro Comitatu charge (2008)

== Death ==
Keresztes died at the Seregély István Papi Social Home in Nyíregyháza, on 13 August 2025, at the age of 93.

== Sources ==
- http://www.magyarkurir.hu/?m_op=view&id=18892
- http://www.atanaz.hu/HDEM/puspok/keresjub.htm
- http://szentbazil.hu/
- http://dragon.intrex.hu/szentmiklosovoda/
- http://gorkataltisk.uw.hu/
- http://www.magyarkurir.hu/?m_op=view&id=2426
- http://www.magyarkurir.hu/?m_op=view&id=5856
- http://www.magyarkurir.hu/?m_op=view&id=980
- http://www.bucsujaras.hu/tanulmany/gkszemle/2005/keresztes3.htm
- http://www.radiovaticana.org/index.html
- http://www.gorogkatolikus.hu/
