= Nyíracsád =

- Village
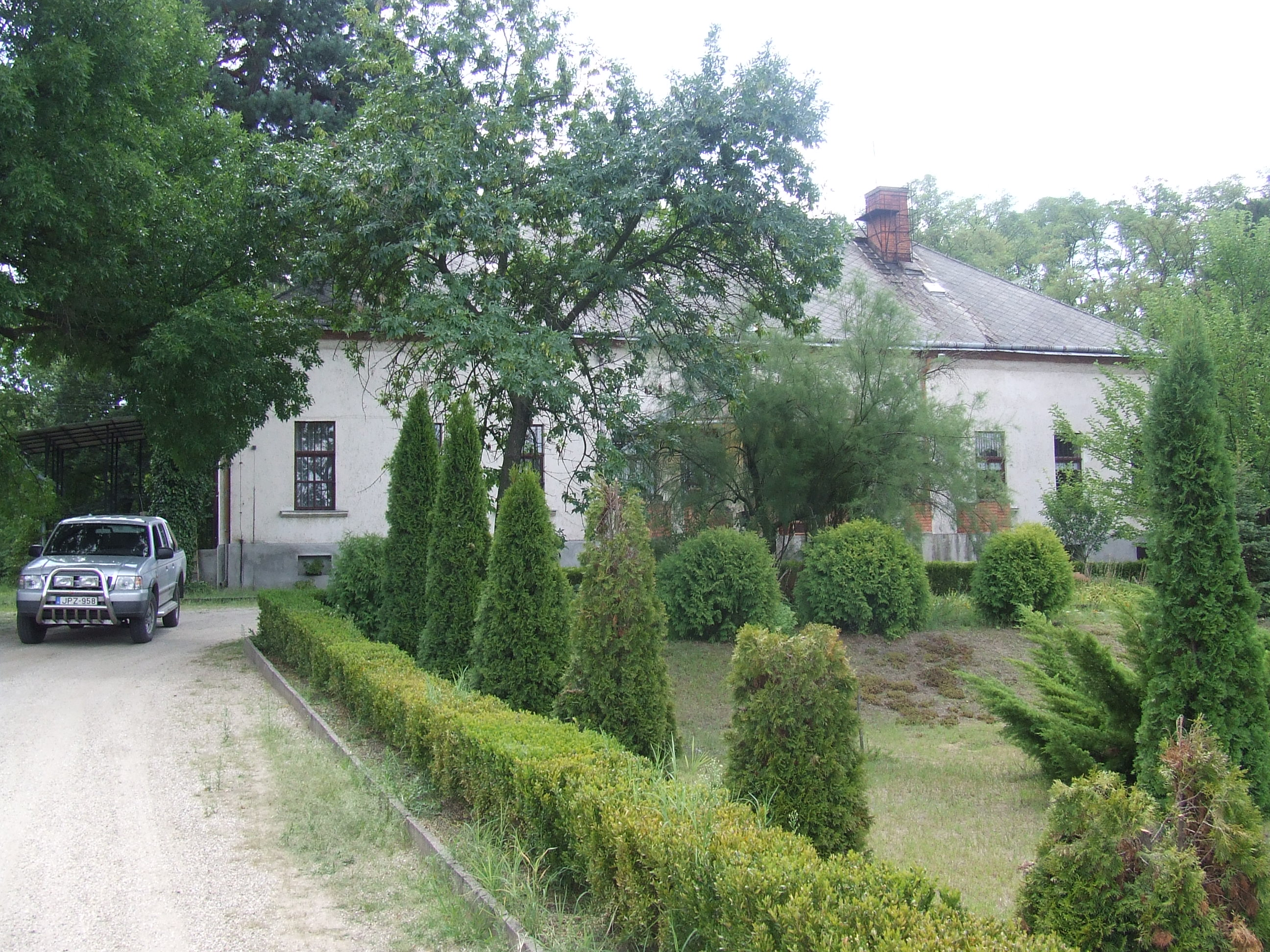
- Buzita Castle in Nyíracsád

- Coat of arms

- Location within Hungary
- Coordinates: 47°36′N 21°59′E
- Country: Hungary
- County: Hajdú-Bihar

Area
  - Total: 75.00 km^{2} (28.96 sq mi)

Population (2015)
  - Total: 3,800
  - Density: 50.7/km^{2} (131/sq mi)
- Time zone: UTC+1 (CET)
  - Summer (DST): UTC+2 (CEST)
- Postal code: 4262
- Area code: 52

Nyíracsád is a village in Hajdú-Bihar county, in the Northern Great Plain region of eastern Hungary.

== Geography ==
It covers an area of 75 km^{2} (29 sq mi) and has a population of 3588 people (2023).

== History ==
Archeological remains indicate that the area was settled by Avars and early Hungarians. The village's name first appears in writing in 1312. The village was first ruled by the Gutkeled clan, who ruled the village even into the 15th century. Their rule was not continuous, however, as other families took possession of the settlement, including the Dobi family. The wars of the 17th century did not drive the village extinct, but its population fell dramatically.

During the Reformation, the majority of the population converted, and in the 17th and 18th centuries, a sizeable orthodox population settled in the village. From 1739 to 1740 there was an outbreak of the plague, which killed a total of 904 villagers.

== Demographics ==
As of 2023, the village had a total population of 3588. As of 2022, the town was 94.1% Hungarian, 4.1% Roma, and 1.6% of non-European origin. The remainder chose not to respond. The population was 42.1% Greek Catholic, 16.1% Roman Catholic, and 14.5% Reformed.

== Notable people ==
- Szilárd Keresztes, Greek Catholic bishop
