= Imre Timkó =

- Eparch of Hajdúdorog
- Church: Hungarian Greek Catholic Church
- Diocese: Eparchy of Hajdúdorog
- In office: 7 January 1975 – 30 March 1988
- Predecessor: Miklós Dudás
- Successor: Szilárd Keresztes
- Other post: Apostolic Administrator of Miskolc (1975-1988)

Orders
- Ordination: 8 December 1945 by Miklós Dudás
- Consecration: 8 February 1975 by Joakim Segedi

Personal details
- Born: 13 August 1920 Budapest, Kingdom of Hungary
- Died: 30 March 1988 (aged 67) Nyíregyháza, Szabolcs–Szatmár County, Hungarian People's Republic

Imre Timkó (13 August 1920 – 30 March 1988) was a Hungarian Greek Catholic hierarch. He was bishop of the Hungarian Greek Catholic Eparchy of Hajdúdorog from 1972 to 1988 and Apostolic Administrator of Apostolic Exarchate of Miskolc from 1972 to 1988.

Born in Budapest, Hungary in 1920, he was ordained a priest on 8 December 1945. He was appointed the Bishop by the Holy See on 7 January 1975. He was consecrated to the Episcopate on 8 February 1975. The principal consecrator was Bishop Joakim Segedi, and the principal co-consecrators were Archbishop József Ijjas and Archbishop József Bánk.

He died in Nyíregyháza on 30 March 1988.

Catholic Church titles
Preceded by Miklós Dudás	Hungarian Catholic Bishop of Hajdúdorog; 1972–1988	Succeeded by Szilárd Keresztes
Preceded by Miklós Dudás	Apostolic Exarchate of Miskolc; 1972–1988 (as Apostolic Administrator)	Succeeded by Szilárd Keresztes
