= Péter Fülöp Kocsis =

Hungarian Greek Catholic archbishop (born 1963)

The Most Reverend Péter Fülöp Kocsis
- Archbishop of Hajdúdorog
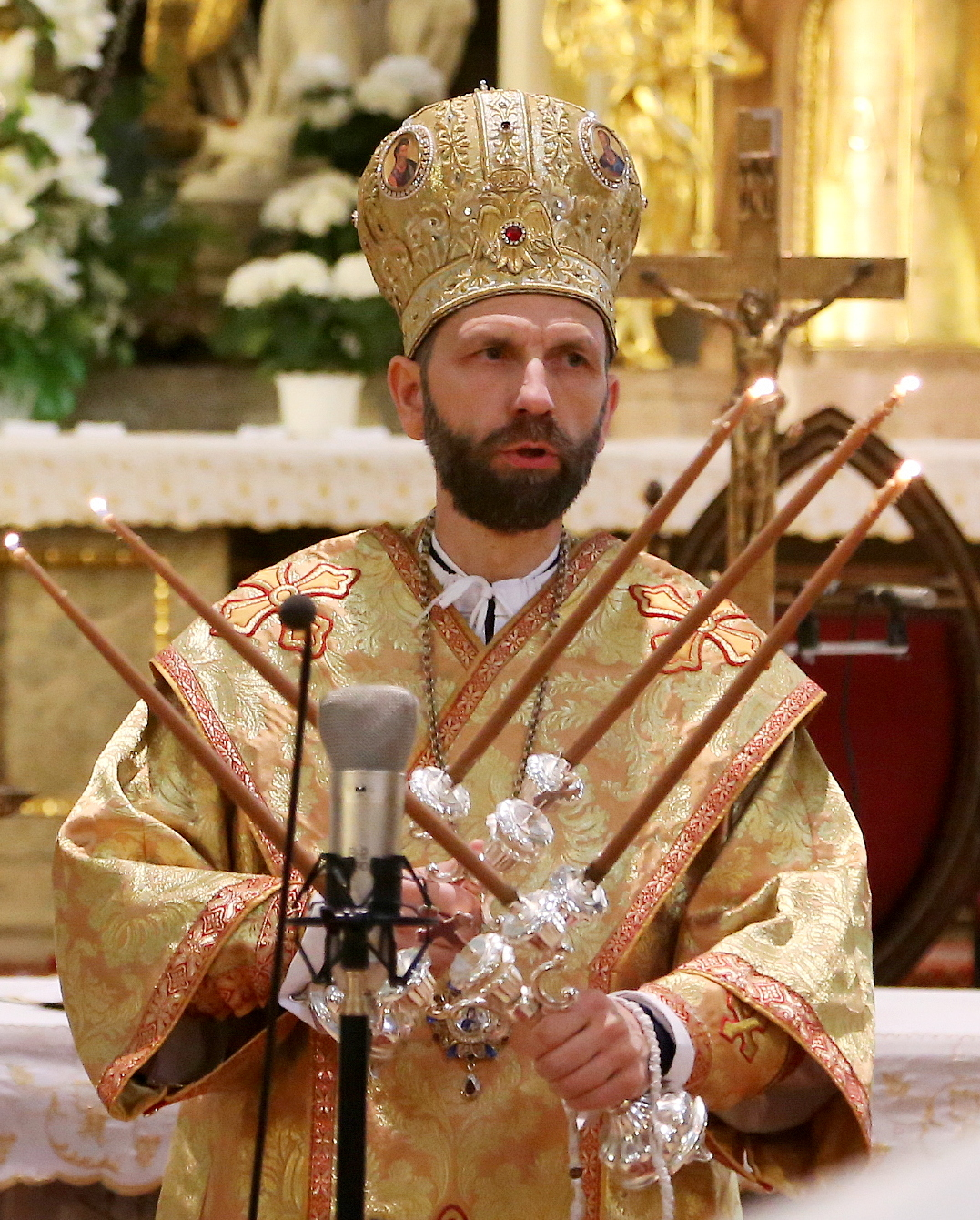
- Péter Fülöp Kocsis in 2013
- Church: Hungarian Greek Catholic Church
- Archdiocese: Hajdúdorog
- See: Hajdúdorog
- In office: 2008 - present
- Predecessor: Szilárd Keresztes
- Previous post: Exarch of Miskolc (2008-2011)

Orders
- Ordination: August 2, 1989
- Consecration: June 30, 2008 by Szilárd Keresztes

Personal details
- Born: January 13, 1963 (age 63) Szeged, People's Republic of Hungary (present day Hungary)

Péter Fülöp Kocsis (born 13 January 1963 in Szeged, Hungary) is the metropolitan archbishop of the Archeparchy of Hajdúdorog and the head of the Hungarian Greek Catholic Church.

== Biography ==
Metropolitan Fülöp studied philosophy and theology at the Saint Athanasius Greek Catholic Theological Institute in Nyíregyháza, Hungary and pedagogy and psychology at the Pontifical Salesian University in Rome, Italy. He was ordained priest in 1989. He served as catechist at a Greek Catholic primary school in Nyíregyháza, than became parish pastor in Tornabarakony. Between 1995 and 1999 he received monastic formation as novice at the bi-ritual Benedictine monastery of Chevetogne. He was tonsured a monk in 1998 on 6 November 1998 by Bishop Szilárd Keresztes of Hajdúdorog receiving his monastic name, Fülöp (Philip). After the retirement of Bishop Szilárd Keresztes, Pope Benedict XVI appointed him to be Bishop of Hajdúdorog and apostolic administrator of the Apostolic Exarchate of Miskolc in 2008. He was consecrated bishop on 30 June 2008 at the Cathedral of Hajdúdorog. The principal consecrator was Bishop Emeritus Szilárd Keresztes, principal co-consecrators were Metropolitan Archbishop Ján Babjak SJ of Presov and Bishop Milan Šašik CM of Munkachevo.

In March 2015 Pope Francis elevated the Eparchy of Hajdúdorog to the rank of metropolitan archeparchy, with Fülöp Kocsis as its archbishop and head of the Hungarian Greek Catholic Church.

Catholic Church titles
Preceded by Szilárd Keresztes	Bishop of Hajdúdorog; 2008–2015	Succeeded by Himself as Archbishop of Hajdúdorog
Preceded by Szilárd Keresztes	Apostolic Exarchate of Miskolc; 2008–2011 (as Apostolic Administrator)	Succeeded by Atanáz Orosz
Preceded by New creation	Archbishop of Hajdúdorog; 2015–present	Incumbent
