= Yuliy Firtsak =

Ruthenian Greek Catholic hierarch (1836–1912)

- Bishop of Mukachevo
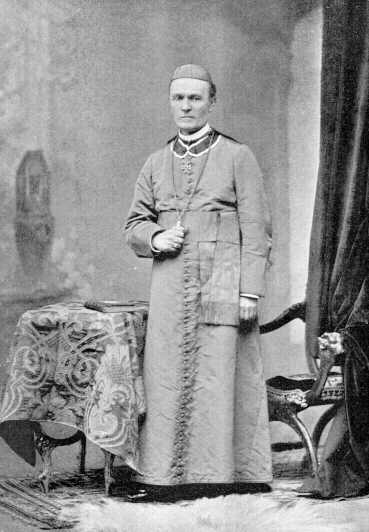
- Native name: Юлій Фірцак
- Church: Ruthenian Greek Catholic Church
- Diocese: Eparchy of Mukachevo
- In office: 17 December 1891 – 1 June 1912
- Predecessor: Ivan Pasteliy
- Successor: Antal Papp

Orders
- Ordination: 26 September 1861 by Vasyl Popovych
- Consecration: 10 April 1892 by Ján Vályi

Personal details
- Born: 22 August 1836 Horlyó, Kingdom of Hungary, Austrian Empire
- Died: 1 June 1912 (aged 75) Ungvár, Kingdom of Hungary, Transleithania, Austria-Hungary

Yuliy Firtsak (Ukrainian: Юлій Фірцак, Hungarian: Firczák Gyula; 22 August 1836 – 1 June 1912) was a Ruthenian Greek Catholic hierarch. He was bishop of the Ruthenian Catholic Eparchy of Mukacheve from 1891 to 1912.

== Life ==
Born in Khudlyovo, Austrian Empire (present day – Ukraine) in 1836, he was ordained a priest on 26 September 1861. He was appointed the Bishop by the Holy See on 17 December 1891. He was consecrated to the Episcopate on 10 April 1892. The principal consecrator was Bishop Ján Vályi, and the principal co-consecrators were Bishop Mihail Pavel and Bishop Gyula Meszlényi.

He died in Uzhhorod on 1 June 1912.

Catholic Church titles
Preceded by Ivan Pasteliy	Ruthenian Catholic Bishop of Mukacheve; 1891–1912	Succeeded by Antal Papp
