= Assumption Cathedral, Miskolc =

Coordinates: 48.1066°N 20.7904°E

Assumption Cathedral
- Nagyboldogasszony püspöki székesegyház
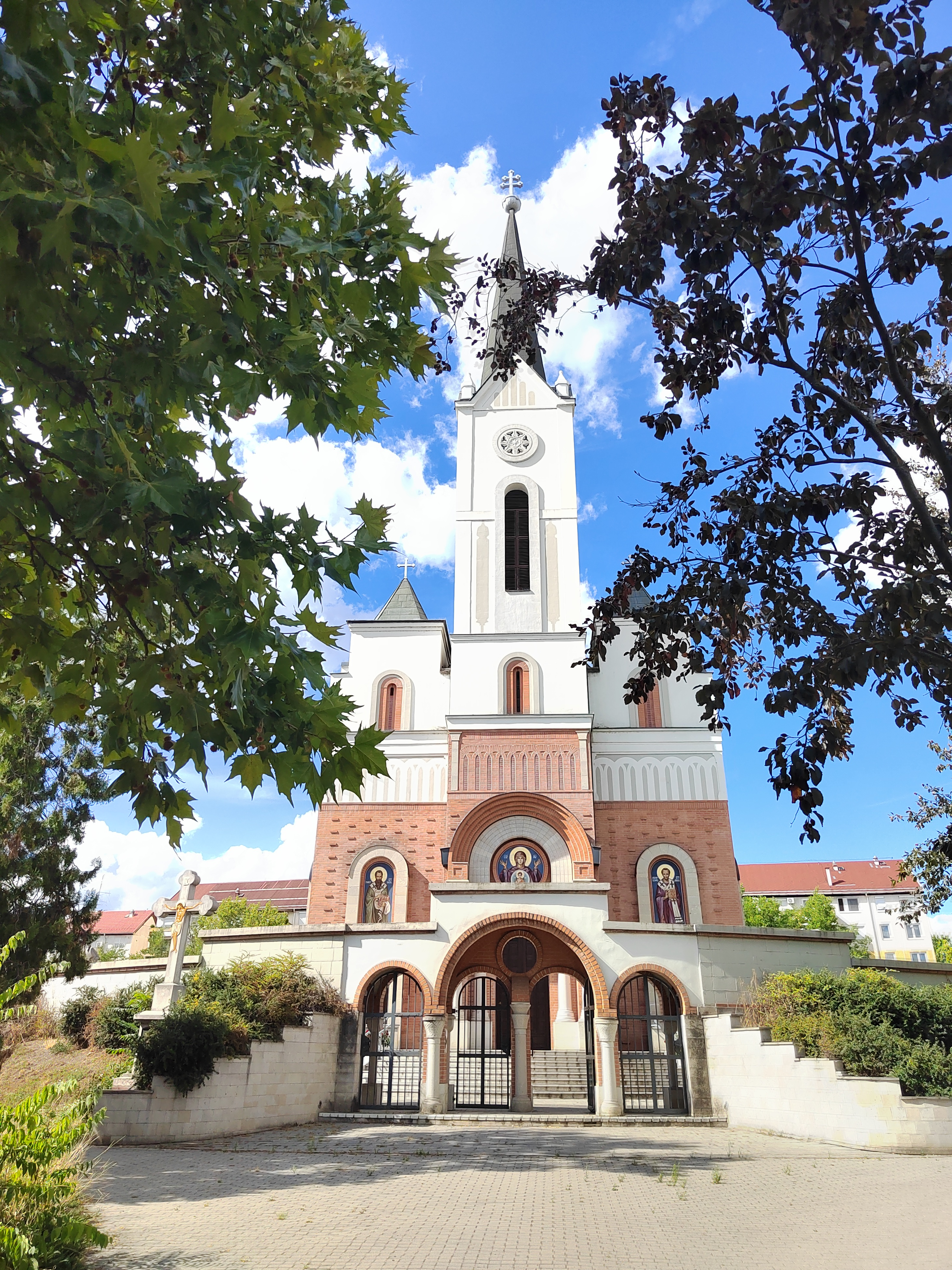
- Assumption Cathedral
- Location: Miskolc
- Country: Hungary
- Denomination: Catholic (Hungarian rite)

The Assumption Cathedral (Hungarian: Nagyboldogasszony püspöki székesegyház) also called Miskolc Cathedral is the name given to a Catholic religious building located in the city of Miskolc, the fourth largest city in the European country of Hungary. Work on the construction of the church began in 1902 and ended in 1912. In 1924 the church was elevated to cathedral.

The temple follows the Hungarian or the Byzantine rite and serves as the cathedral of the Eparchy of Miskolc (Eparchia Miskolcensis or Miskolci Egyházmegye) that got its current status by decision of Pope Francis in March 2015 as part of the reorganization of the Greek Catholic Hungarian Church, one of the eastern churches in full communion with the Pope in Rome.

The construction style has pre-modern and neo-Gothic elements.

== See also ==
- List of cathedrals in Hungary

Internal view
