= Rakovec nad Ondavou =

Municipality in Slovakia

Rakovec nad Ondavou Rákóc
- Municipality
- Flag

- Location of Rakovec nad Ondavou in the Košice Region Location of Rakovec nad Ondavou in Slovakia
- Coordinates: 48.77°N 21.78°E
- Country: Slovakia
- Region: Košice Region
- District: Michalovce District
- First mentioned: 1266

Area
  - Total: 15.21 km^{2} (5.87 sq mi)
- Elevation: 125 m (410 ft)

Population (2025)
  - Total: 997
- Time zone: UTC+1 (CET)
  - Summer (DST): UTC+2 (CEST)
- Postal code: 720 3
- Area code: +421 56
- Vehicle registration plate (until 2022): MI
- Website: www.rakovecnadondavou.sk

Rakovec nad Ondavou (Hungarian: Rákóc) is a village and municipality in Michalovce District in the Kosice Region of eastern Slovakia.

== Etymology ==
The name is of Slovak origin. It derives from rak - a crayfish.

== History ==
In historical records the village was first mentioned in 1266.

== Geography ==
The municipality lies at an altitude of 125 metres (410 ft) and covers an area of 15.21 km^{2} (5.87 sq mi) (2025).

== Population ==
Population statistic (10 years)
Year	1995	2005	2015	2025
Count	1071	1062	1051	997
Difference		−0.84%	−1.03%	−5.13%

Population statistic
Year	2024	2025
Count	1015	997
Difference		−1.77%

It has a population of 997 people (31 December 2025).

=== Ethnicity ===
Census 2021 (1+%)
Ethnicity	Number	Fraction
Slovak	975	96.05%
Not found out	28	2.75%
Total	1015	

In year 2021 was 1015 people by ethnicity 975 as Slovak, 28 as Not found out, 7 as Hungarian, 5 as Romani, 3 as Czech, 3 as Ukrainian, 3 as Rusyn, 2 as English and 1 as Polish.

Note on population: The difference values of population numbers in the table "Population statistic" and in the sections "Ethnicity" & "Religion" is caused by the use of various statistical methods.

=== Religion ===
Census 2021 (1+%)
Religion	Number	Fraction
Greek Catholic Church	543	53.5%
Roman Catholic Church	343	33.79%
None	69	6.8%
Not found out	26	2.56%
Evangelical Church	14	1.38%
Calvinist Church	12	1.18%
Total	1015	

In year 2021 was 1015 people by religion 543 from Greek Catholic Church, 343 from Roman Catholic Church, 69 from None, 26 from Not found out, 14 from Evangelical Church, 12 from Calvinist Church, 6 from Eastern Orthodox Church, 1 from Other and 1 from Buddhism.
