= Miklós Dudás (bishop) =

Hungarian Greek Catholic hierarch

Miklós Dudás O.S.B.M.
- Eparch of Hajdúdorog
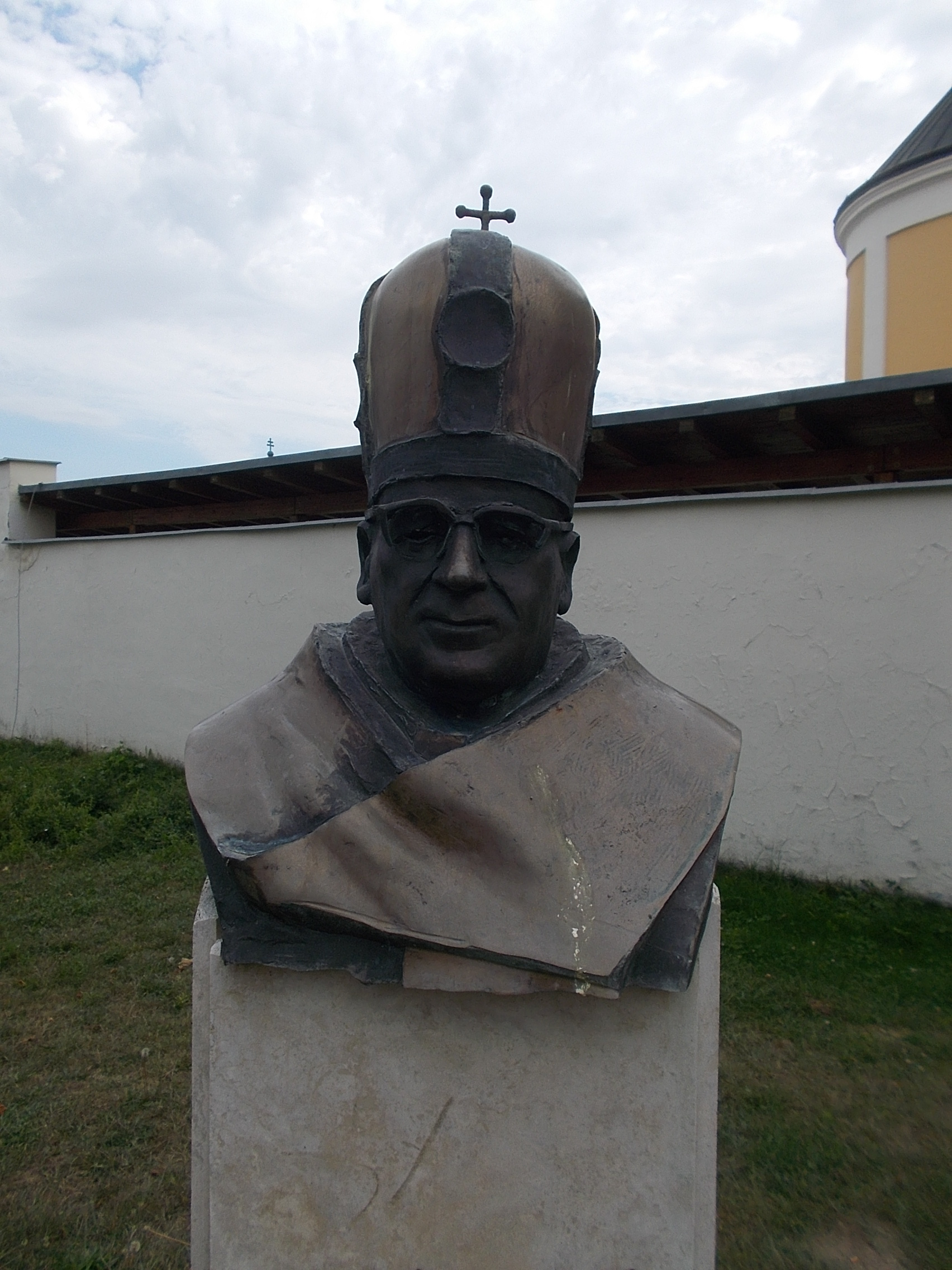
- Bust of Dudás in Kossuth Lajos Square, in the town of Máriapócs, Szabolcs–Szatmár–Bereg County
- Church: Hungarian Greek Catholic Church
- Diocese: Eparchy of Hajdúdorog
- In office: 25 April 1939 – 15 July 1972
- Predecessor: István Miklósy
- Successor: Imre Timkó
- Other post: Apostolic Administrator of Miskolc (1946-1972)
- Previous post: Apostolic Administrator of Mukachevo (1944)

Orders
- Ordination: 8 September 1927 by Istvan Miklósy
- Consecration: 14 May 1939 by Antal Papp

Personal details
- Born: 27 October 1902 Máriapócs, Kingdom of Hungary, Transleithania, Austria-Hungary
- Died: 15 July 1972 (aged 69) Nyíregyháza, Szabolcs–Szatmár County, Hungarian People's Republic

Miklós Dudás O.S.B.M. (27 October 1902 – 15 July 1972) was a Hungarian Greek Catholic hierarch. He was bishop of the Hungarian Greek Catholic Eparchy of Hajdúdorog from 1939 to 1972, Apostolic Administrator of the Ruthenian Catholic Eparchy of Mukacheve from 1943 to 1946 and Apostolic Administrator of Apostolic Exarchate of Miskolc from 1946 to 1972.

== Life ==
Born in Máriapócs, Austria-Hungary in 1902, he was ordained a priest on 8 September 1927. He was appointed a bishop by the Holy See on 25 March 1939. He was consecrated to the Episcopate on 14 May 1939. The principal consecrator was Antal Papp, and the principal co-consecrators were Endré Kriston and Zoltán Lajos Meszlényi.

He died in Nyíregyháza on 15 July 1972.

== See also ==
- Catholic Church in Hungary

Catholic Church titles
| Preceded by István Miklósy | Hungarian Catholic Bishop of Hajdúdorog; 1939–1972 | Succeeded by Imre Timkó |
| Preceded by Oleksandr Stoyka | Ruthenian Catholic Eparchy of Mukacheve; 1943–1946 (as Apostolic Administrator) | Succeeded by Theodore Romzha (as Ap. Administrator) |
| Preceded by Antal Papp | Apostolic Exarchate of Miskolc; 1946–1972 (as Apostolic Administrator) | Succeeded by Imre Timkó |
