= Bezeredi =

Bezeredi or Bezerédi is a surname. Notable people with the surname include:

- Gyula Bezerédi (1858–1925), Hungarian sculptor
- Lujo Bezeredi (1898–1979), Croatian-Hungarian sculptor and painter
- Zoltán Bezerédi (born 1955), Hungarian actor

== See also ==
- Bezeréd, village in Zala County in the south-western region of Hungary
