= Turkiewicz =

Turkiewicz is a Polish surname, a patronymic form of the English surname Turk. Notable people with the surname include:

- Jim Turkiewicz (born 1955), ice hockey player
- Michał Turkiewicz (1956–2021), Polish politician
- Sophia Turkiewicz, Australian film and television director
