= Thürk =

Thürk or Thurk is a German language ethnonymic surname for derived from the ethnonym Turk. Notable people with the name include:

- Harry Thürk (1927–2005), German writer
- Michael Thurk (born 1976), German footballer

== See also ==
- Turk (surname)
