= Turk =

Turk or Turks may refer to:

== Communities and ethnic groups ==
- Turkish people, or the Turks, a Turkic ethnic group and nation
- Turkish citizen, a citizen of the Republic of Turkey
- Turkic peoples, a collection of ethnic groups who speak Turkic languages
- Turks, reference to the Ottoman Empire
- Turk (term for Muslims), used by non-Muslim Balkan peoples
- Turks of South Carolina, a group of people in the US
- Inhabitants of Faymonville, Liège, Belgium, nicknamed "Turks"
- Inhabitants of Llanelli, Carmarthenshire, Wales, nicknamed "Turks"

== People ==
- Turk (surname), a list of people with the name
- Turk (nickname), a list of people with the nickname
- Turk (rapper), stage name of American rapper Tab Virgil Jr. (born 1981)
- Philippe Liégeois (born 1947), pen name "Turk", Belgian comic book artist
- Al-Turk, a list of people with the name

== Places ==
- Brig o' Turk, a small rural village in Scotland
- Turks Islands, part of the Turks and Caicos Islands, West Indies
- Turk Site, an archaeological site in Kentucky, US

== Arts and entertainment ==
=== Fictional entities ===
- Turks (Final Fantasy VII), from the video game Final Fantasy VII
- Turks, a motorcycle club from the 1985 film Mask
- Christopher Turk, from the TV series Scrubs
- Turk Barrett, from Marvel comics
- Terry Lynch, from the 1985 film Turk 182
- The Turk, a chess computer from a self-titled episode of the TV series Terminator: The Sarah Connor Chronicles
- Virgil "The Turk" Sollozzo, a character from the 1972 film The Godfather
- Turk Malloy, a member of Danny Ocean's heist crew from the 2001 film Ocean's Eleven

=== Works ===
- The Turk (play), by John Mason
- "Turk", a track on the 2007 album Death Is This Communion by High on Fire
- Turks (TV series), a 1999 American police drama
- "Turks" (song), 2020, by Nav and Gunna

== Other uses ==
- Türk (magazine), periodical published by the Committee of Union and Progress in Cairo between 1903 and 1907

== See also ==
- Turkmen (disambiguation)
- Turk's Head (disambiguation)
- Turck (disambiguation)
- Turku, a city in Finland
- Mechanical Turk or The Turk, a fraudulent chess-playing machine constructed in the late 18th century
