= Heads in heraldry =

Heraldic figure

A Turk's head couped in the arms of the Hungarian town Komádi.

The heads of humans and other animals are frequently occurring charges in heraldry. The blazon, or heraldic description, usually states whether an animal's head is couped (as if cut off cleanly at the neck), erased (as if forcibly ripped from the body), or cabossed (turned affronté without any of the neck showing). Human heads are often described in much greater detail, though some of these are identified by name with little or no further description.

== Forms of display ==
Heads may appear:

- cabossed (also caboshed or caboched): with the head cleanly separated from the neck so that only the face shows
- couped: with the neck cleanly separated from the body so that the whole head and neck are present
- erased: with the neck showing a ragged edge as if forcibly torn from the body.

Heads that are couped or erased face dexter unless otherwise specified for differencing. Heads of horned beasts are often shown cabossed to display the horns, but instances can be found in any of these circumstances.

=== Cabossed ===
A stag's head cabossed sable attired gules in the arms of Calder

In heraldry, cabossed, or caboched, is a term used where the head of a beast is cut off behind the ears, by a section parallel to the face; or by a perpendicular section: in contrast to couping, which is done by a horizontal line, and farther from the ears than cabossing.

Cabossed heads are shown facing forward (affronté).

=== Couped ===
Heads that are couped have a straight edge, as if cut with a sword.

=== Erased ===
A lion's head erased argent, langued azure

Erasure in blazon, the language of heraldry, is the tearing off of part of a charge, leaving a jagged edge of it remaining. In blazons the term is most often found in its adjectival form, erased, and is usually applied to animate charges, most often heads or other body parts.

John Craig's dictionary of 1854 says:

In Heraldry, anything is said to be erased which appears forcibly torn off, leaving the edges jagged and uneven.

When a tree or other plant is shown uprooted, with the bare roots showing, it is called eradicated.

There are different traditions for the erasing of heads. For instance, with the head of a bear, whether couped or erased, in English heraldry the separation is done horizontally under the neck, which is not lost, whereas in Scottish heraldry the usual practice is for the head to be separated from the body vertically, without keeping the neck attached to it.

== Heads of humans ==
Heads of humans are sometimes blazoned simply as a "man's head", but are far more frequently described in greater detail, either characteristic of a particular race or nationality (such as Moor's heads, Saxons' heads, Egyptians' heads or Turks' heads), or specifically identified (such as the head of Moses in the crest of Hilton, or the head of St. John the Baptist in the crest of the Worshipful Company of Tallow Chandlers). Several varieties of women's heads also occur, including maidens' heads (often couped under the bust, with hair disheveled), ladies' heads, nuns' heads (often veiled), and occasionally queens' heads. The arms of Daveney of Norfolk include "three nun's heads veiled couped at the shoulders proper," and the bust of a queen occurs in the arms of Queenborough, Kent. Infants' or children's heads are often couped at the shoulders with a snake wrapped around the neck (e.g. "Argent, a boy's head proper, crined or, couped below the shoulders, vested gules, garnished gold," in the arms of Boyman).

== Heads of animals ==
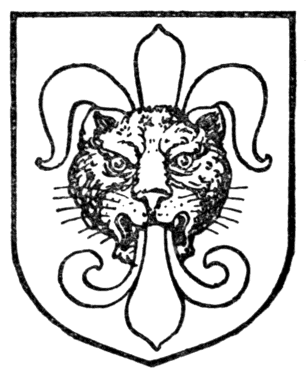
A leopard's head jessant-de-lys

While lions passant guardant (i.e. walking with head turned to full face) are often called leopards in heraldry, the heads and faces of natural leopards occur frequently in armory, as crests as well as charges. The key distinction being that a leopard's head shows the neck, the leopard's face (turned affronté and cut off cleanly behind the ears) occurs far more frequently. A curious development, unique to the leopard's face, is when it is run through with a fleur-de-lis, called a leopard's face jessant-de-lys. When the face of a fox is shown (i.e. cabossed), it is termed a fox's mask.

Predatory creatures, including eagles, lions, griffins, bears and boars, are often armed of a different tincture, referring to the colour of the creature's claws or talons and beak, teeth or tusks. In the case of the boar, its armaments include only its tusks, but not its hooves, which may be unguled of another tincture. Deer and moose are antler-bearing herbivores, so their antlers are not considered armaments but their attire, so these may be attired of a distinct tincture, while horn-bearing beasts such as bulls, rams and goats may be armed.

== Gallery ==
Head of St. Erik (Swedish: Erik den helige, patron saint of Stockholm) couped and crowned Or, and a griffin's head erased sable armed and langued gules, in the arms of Stockholm County

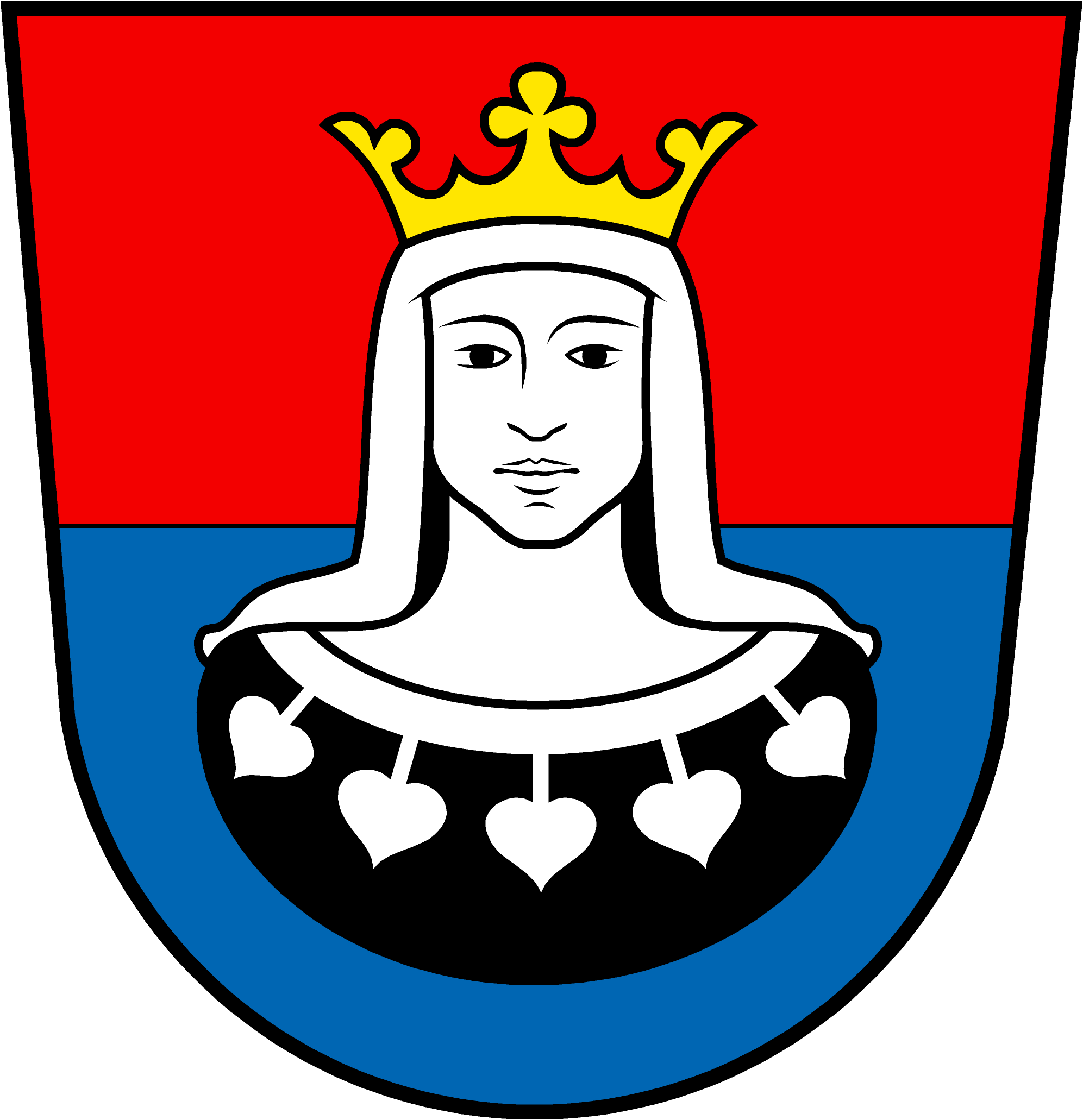
Head of Queen Hildegard (second wife of Charlemagne) in the arms of the Imperial Ducal Abbey of Kempten

Four moors' heads couped and blindfolded in the arms of Sardinia

Seven human heads in the coat of arms of Nurmijärvi

A Turk's head cabossed, pigtailed and moustached sable, transfixed upon a scimitar, in the arms of Hajdúdorog, Hungary

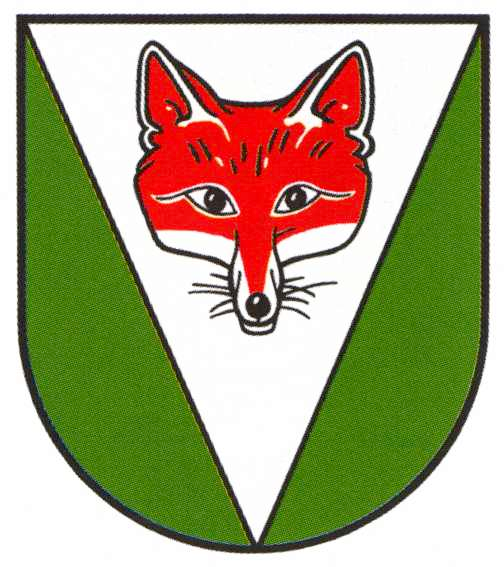
A fox's mask in the arms of Winkel, a quarter in the German city of Gifhorn

A stag's head cabossed sable attired gules in the arms of Calder

A boar's head erased sable armed argent in the arms of Denhoff

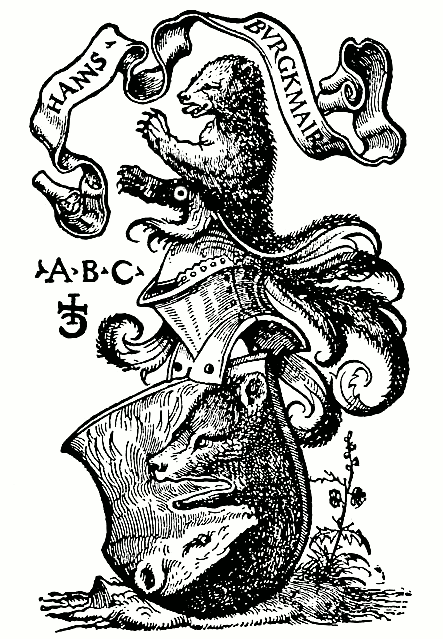
Interlocking bear heads in the arms (granted 1516) of Hans Burgkmair the Elder

The current coat of arms of Aragon (Spain) features four heads of Moors

After the conquest of Raab from the Turks, Adolf von Schwarzenberg modified the Schwarzenberg coat of arms to include the head of a Turk

The coat of Avenches, Switzerland

Talbot’s head erased gules langued azure

Boar's head erased argent langued gules tusked or

Griffin's head erased

Cow’s head erased proper

Stag's head erased

Fox’s head erased or langued gules

Lion's gambs erased, in the arms of Hubert Chesshyre, Norroy and Ulster King of Arms (1995–1997)

A boar's head erased

A wolf head erased in the coat of arms of Sipoo

== See also ==
- Moor's head (heraldry)
- Turk head (heraldry)
- Skull and crossbones (symbol)
- Totenkopf
- Jessant-de-lys
