= Al-Turki =

Al-Turki is an Arabic-language surname meaning "the Turk". Notable people with the name include:

- Abdullah bin Abdulmohsen Al-Turki (born 1940), Muslim religious leader from Saudi Arabia
- Amajur al-Turki (died c. 878), Abbasid military officer of Turkic ethnicity
- Azjur al-Turki, Abbasid military officer of Turkic ethnicity
- Hassan Abdullah Hersi al-Turki (1944–2015), Somali Islamist military leader
- Homaidan Al-Turki (born 1969), Saudi-American rapist
- Mohammed Al Turki, Saudi film producer
- Said Farouk Al-Turki (born 1943), Saudi Arabian Olympic athlete
- Wasif al-Turki (died 867), Abbasid general of Turkic ethnicity

== See also ==
- Taybah al-Turki, village in central Syria
- Turki (name)
