= Turk (nickname) =

Turk or The Turk is a nickname for:

- Turk Broda (1914–72), Canadian hockey player
- Carolina Duer (born 1978), known as "The Turk", Argentine world champion boxer
- Turk Edwards (1907–1973), American football player
- Turk Farrell (1934–1977), American baseball player
- Gerard Gallant (born September 2, 1963), nicknamed "Turk", Canadian ice hockey coach and former player
- Turk Lown (1924–2016), American baseball player
- Turk McBride (born 1985), American football player
- Turk Murphy (1915–1987), American trombonist and bandleader
- Derek Sanderson (born 1946), nicknamed "Turk", Canadian hockey player
- Turk Wendell (born 1967), American baseball player
- Raymond Westerling (1919–87), nicknamed "The Turk", Dutch officer who attempted a coup in Indonesia

== See also ==
- Turk (disambiguation)
- Turk (surname)
- El Turco (Spanish, 'The Turk'), a list of people with the nickname
- Faymonville, Belgium, whose inhabitants are nicknamed Turks
- Llanelli, Wales, whose inhabitants are nicknamed Turks
- Louis William, Margrave of Baden-Baden (1655–1707), known as Türkenlouis ('Turkish Louis')
