= Zalakoppány =

- Suburb
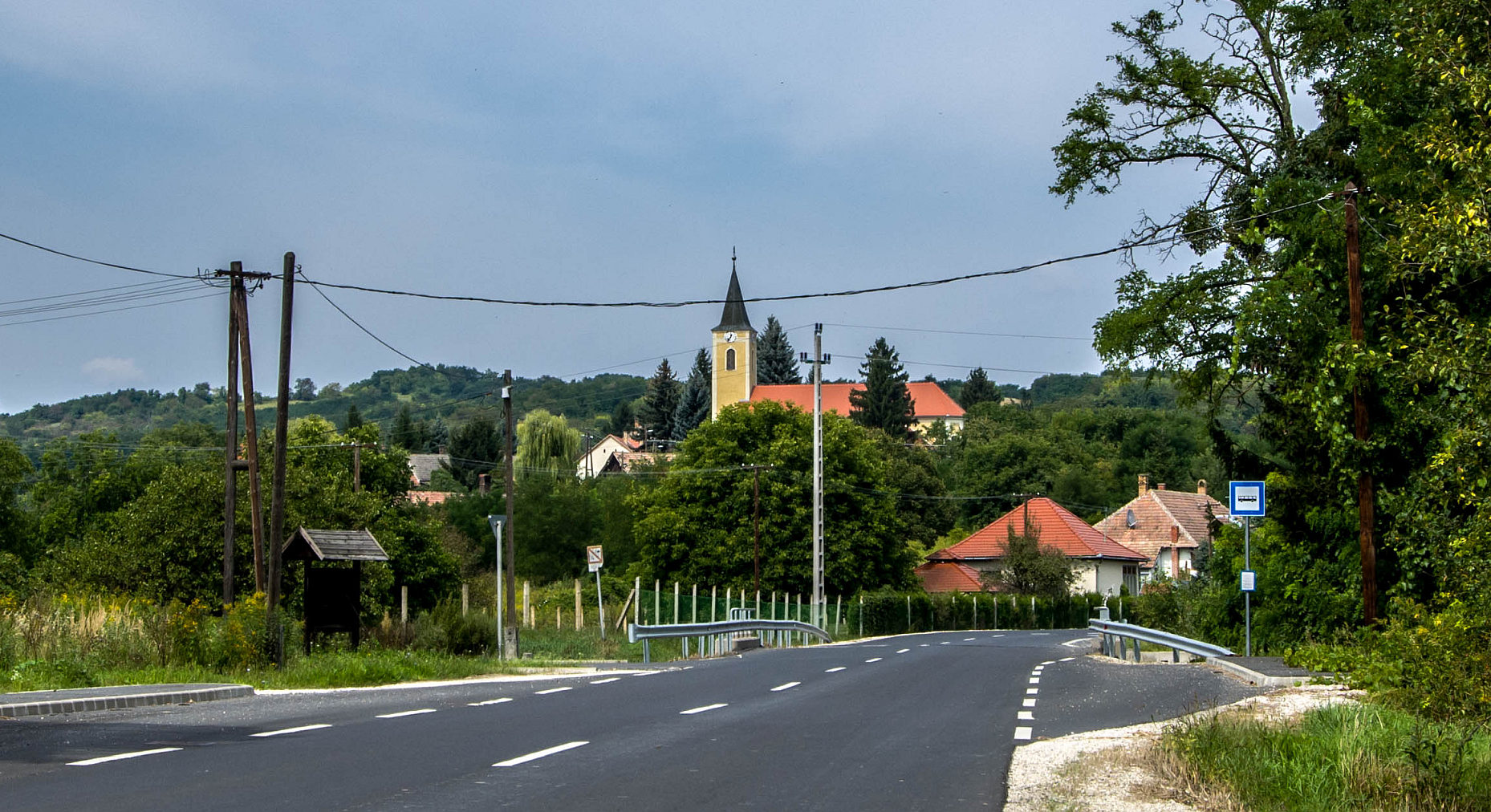
- Interactive map of Zalakoppány
- Coordinates: 46°53′1″N 17°4′13″E
- Country: Hungary
- County: Zala
- Town: Zalaszentgrót

Government
  - Type: Sub-municipality
  - Sub-municipality representative: János Veress

Area
  - Total: 1 km^{2} (0.39 sq mi)
- Elevation: 136 m (446 ft)

Population (2011)
  - Total: 291
- Postal code: 8785
- Website: zalakoppany.hu

Zalakoppány is a suburb of the town Zalaszentgrót in Zala county, Hungary. It was an independent village until 1984.

== History ==
=== Prehistoric times ===
Evidence suggests that the village area was inhabited by at least the Late Bronze Age by Celtic groups. There was a fortification in the area locally called Aszaltető.

=== Medieval times ===
After the Hungarian conquest, the area was part of the Zala estates of chieftain Koppány, hence the name of the settlement. The earliest written record of the area dates back to 1217 in the form of Kopan. In the Middle Ages, it formed the ancestral estate of the Bezerédi family of the clan Lőrente (with the neighbouring village of Bezeréd), its parish priest mentioned in 1419, so it must have had a church by then. The village remained populated during the Turkish occupation, owned by the Bezerédi, Fényes and Kozáry families.

=== 18th century ===
A tax record from 1720 describes 16 taxpayers. In 1740, Maria Theresia lists six plots of land in Zalakoppány among the estates donated to the Vajda family. Mid-century censuses record 100-150 different surnames in the village. The village's Baroque church, dedicated to the Assumption, committed by Márton Bíró Padányi, Archbishop of Veszprém, was built in 1756. A military survey of 1763-1787 shows about 140 houses, with the size and structure of the village being almost identical to that of today.

=== 19th century ===
37 soldiers from Zalakoppány took part in the Hungarian Revolution of 1848. The Pallas Encyclopedia of 1891 mentions a population of 1269 and that the settlement had a post office and a postal savings bank. Famous politician Ferenc Deák living in the nearby Kehidakustány also had estates among the vineyards belonging to the village, this was for a time commemorated by a carved post in the hills.

=== 20th century ===
In the First World War, about 400 inhabitants of Zalakoppány fought as soldiers, 53 of them did not return home - their memorial plaque was unveiled in 1932 next to the church. In the 1920s, coal was prospected and found in the area around the village, which led to the discovery of the artesian well in the "Kanizsa" part of the village. The Zalakoppány mill and the Mittermayer-Horváth mill, which can still be found in its ruins, operated in the village until the beginning of the 20th century, next to the latter was also a bathing place on the river Zala. World War II claimed 35 military and 15 civilian victims. They are also commemorated by a marble slab and memorial posts in the church forecourt. The church was completely renovated in 1972.

The village lost its independence in 1984, when along with the neighbouring settlements (Csáford, Tekenye, Zalaudvarnok), as the farthest, Zalakoppány was also incorporated into Zalaszentgrót, thereby granting it town status.

== Present time ==
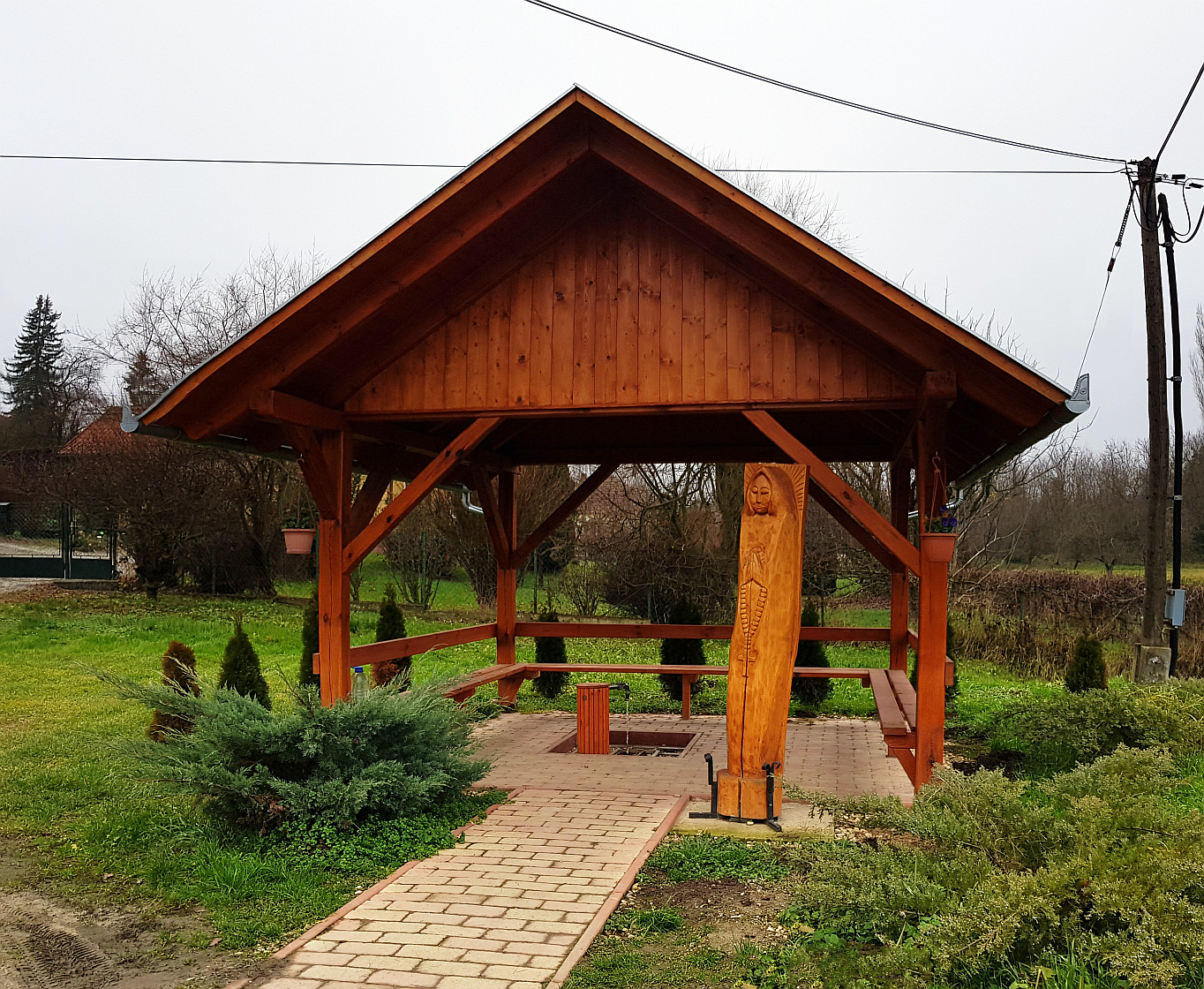

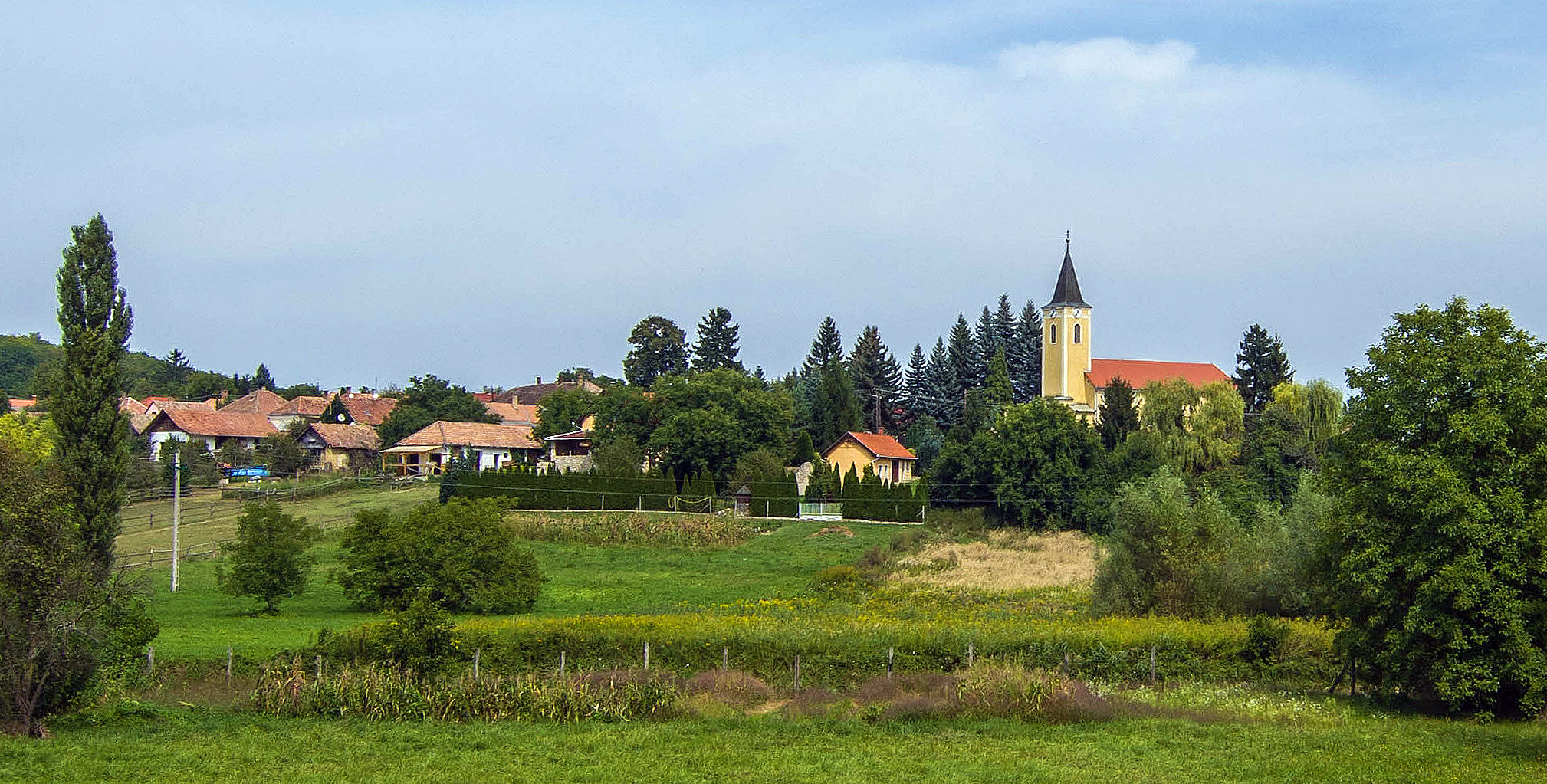

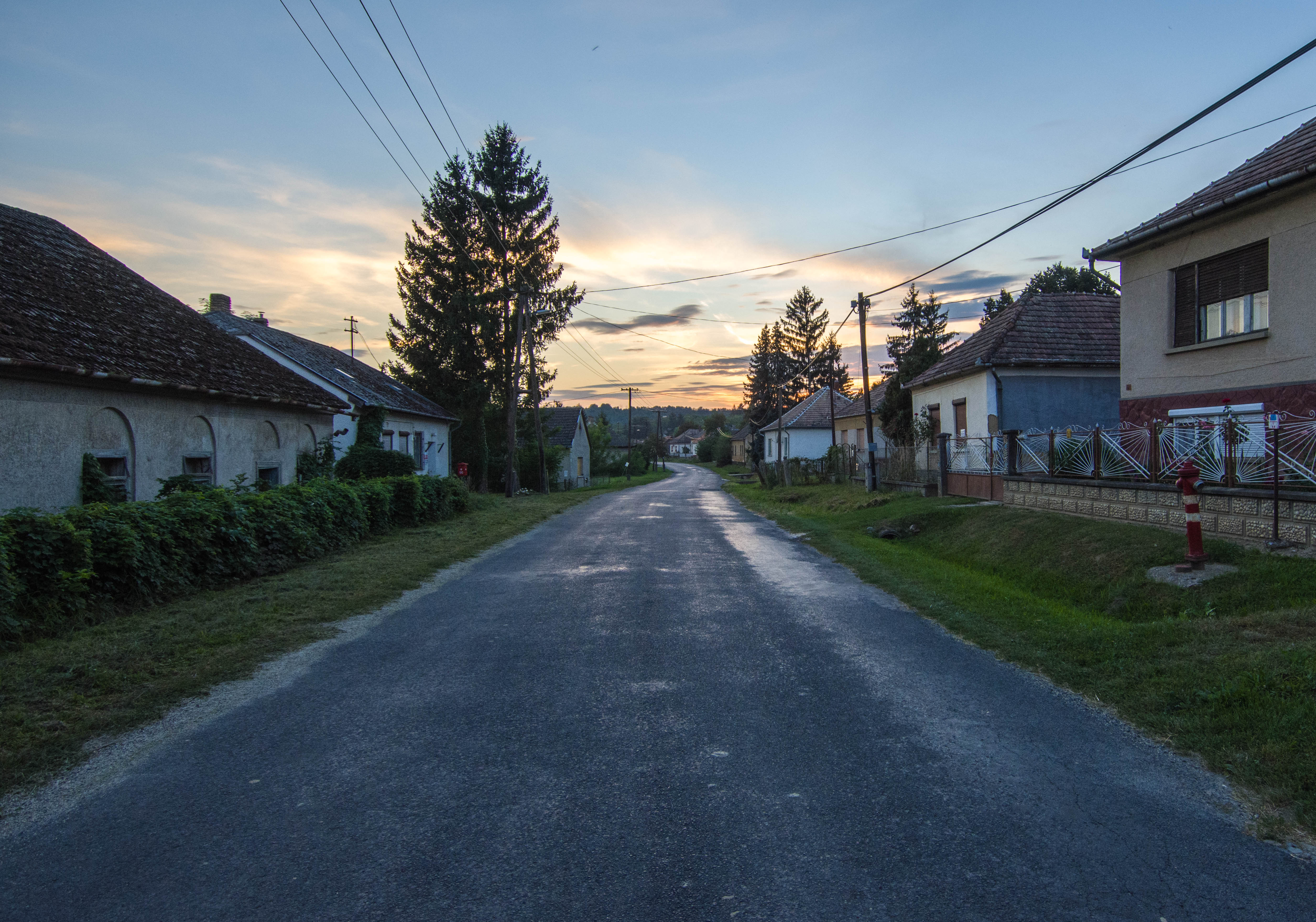

Roof and railing was added to the artesian well in 2017, and a statue of the Blessed Virgin Mary by woodcarver Lajos Szabó was erected next to it.

The Association for a More Livable Zalakoppány (Élhetőbb Zalakoppányért Egyesület) has been operating in the village since 2015, helping to improve the life of the village by organising events and renovating/maintaining public spaces.

The village day is held on the 15th of August.

Representatives of the Zalakoppány sub-municipality:

- 2006-2014: József Beke
- 2014-: János Veress

== Notable persons born or living here ==
- Farkas Háry (~1765-1851) Respector of Zala County
- Elek Békefi (1859-1909) teacher, viticulturist
- József Békefi (1897-?) teacher, composer, poet, writer
- Ildikó Benyó (1946-2011) graphic artist, painter

Opera singer János Sárdy spent part of his childhood here, his sister's renovated tomb can be found in the village cemetery.
