= Özgen =

Özgen is a Turkish surname. Notable people with the surname include:

- Abdulkadir Özgen (born 1986), Turkish-German footballer
- Pemra Özgen (born 1986), Turkish tennis player
- Tolga Özgen (born 1980), Turkish footballer

== See also ==
- Özgentürk, people with this name
