= Drugu =

Dru gu (also Trugu) is the Tibetan term for Turkic peoples. They are also referred to as Du ru ka, which is based on the Sanskrit word Turuṣka. Turuṣka was a corrupted form of the ethnic name Turk.
