= Turk head (heraldry) =

Heraldry figure of severed head

Coat of arms of the Hungarian town Komádi.

In European heraldry, the severed Turk head, (Note: Hungarian: Törökfej; Polish: Turecka głowa; Czech and Slovak: Turecká hlava; Serbo-Croatian: Turska glava, Турска глава; Ukrainian: Турецька голова, romanized: Turetska holova.) most often as pierced by a sword, signifies the many wars fought by European Christian states against the attacking Muslim, Turkish-led Ottoman Empire. Other depictions include the head held up by a victor or picked by a raven. It is used in modern town, municipality and village coats of arms in Hungary, Serbia, Croatia and the Czech Republic.

== List ==
=== Cities and towns ===
- Hungary: Bezeréd, Derecske, Komádi, Gáborján, Hajdúdorog, Hajdúnánás, Szécsény, Tépe
- Serbia: Kikinda, Vršac
- Croatia: Đelekovec
- Czech Republic: Orlík nad Vltavou

=== Families ===
It was adopted by some Austro-Hungarian nobility, such as:

- The Balogh of Nemčice (in Slovakia), Mezőcsávás (in Romania), Csegö (?), Szász-Czegö (?)
- The Schwarzenberg of Český Krumlov (in Bohemia)
- The Baky
- The Benkeö of Kezdi-Sarfalva
- The Branovacki
- The Csernovics
- The Csernoevicz
- The Csokits
- The Dunca of Sajo
- The Eperjessy of Gyulafehérvár (in Romania)
- The Gaines
- The Kajdachy
- The Karácson
- The Kovács
- The Kruchió
- The Latinovics
- The Nagy
- The Okolicsányi
- The Pótsa

== Gallery ==
Schwarzenberg family arms, with a crow pecking at a Turk's head

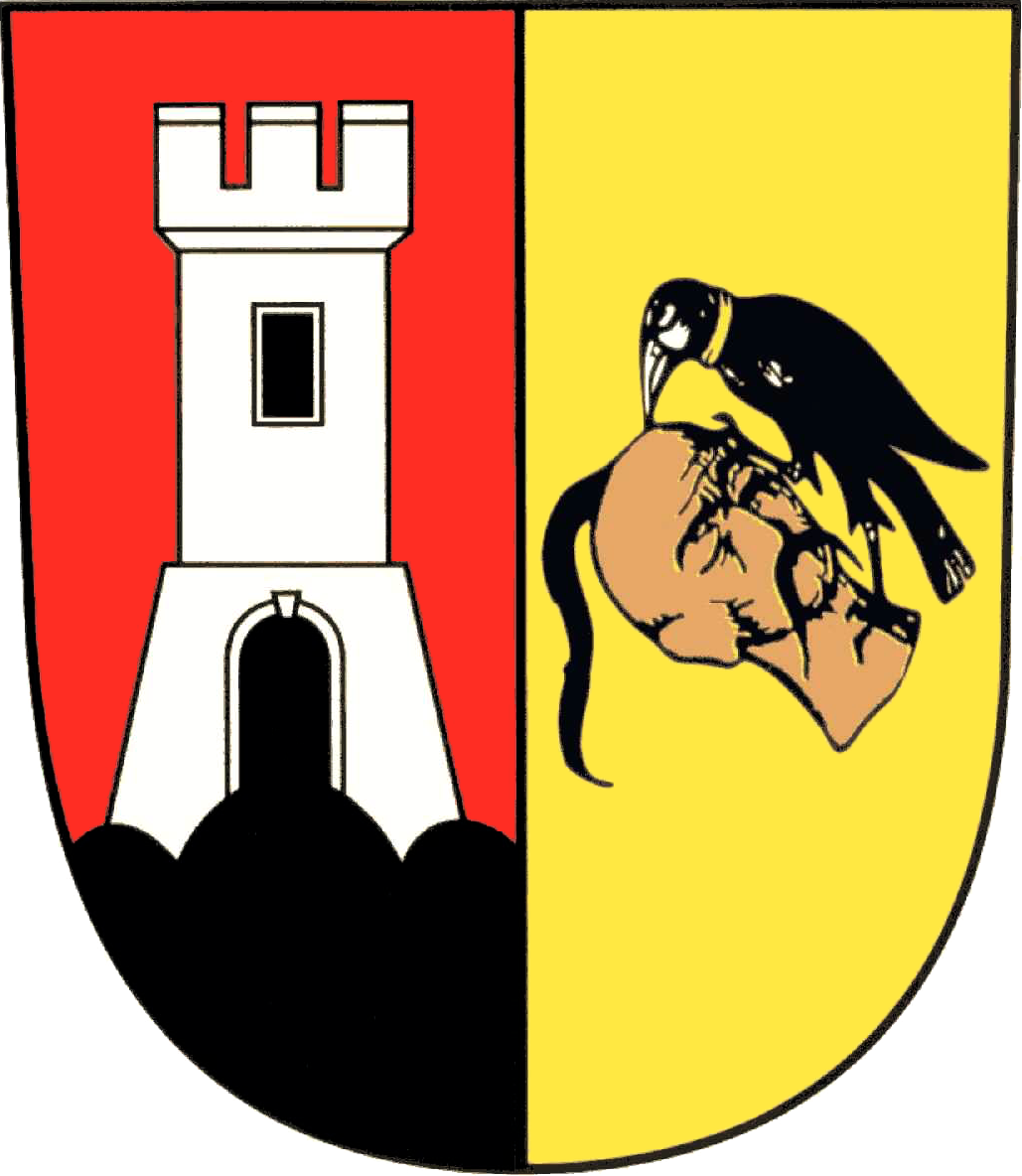
Arms of the town of Orlík nad Vltavou, Czech Republic

Arms of the town of Derecske, Hungary

Arms of the town of Hajdúdorog, Hungary

Arms of the Balogh family from Mezőcsávás, Hungary

Arms of the town of Tépe, Hungary

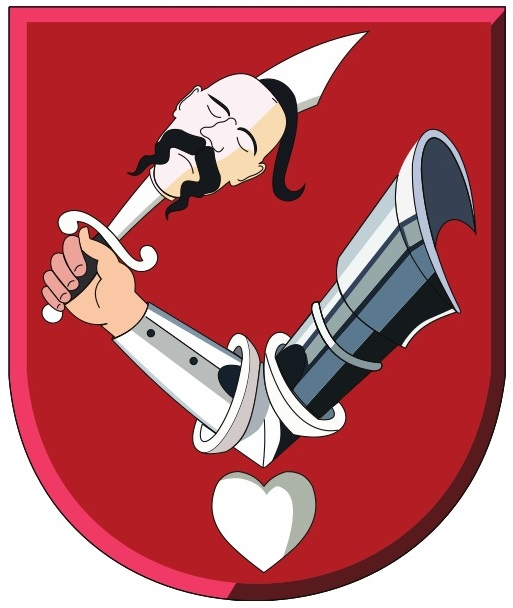
Arms of the city of Kikinda, Serbia

== See also ==
- Heads in heraldry
- Moor's head (heraldry)
- Ottoman wars in Europe
