= Tuerk =

Tuerk is a surname, and is a variation of Turk. Notable people with the surname include:

- Fred J. Tuerk (1922–2001), American journalist and politician
- Matthew Tuerk (born 1975), American politician
- Max Tuerk (1994–2020), American football player
