= El Turco =

El Turco is Spanish for "the Turk". It is the nickname of:

- Abraham Ancer (born 1991), Mexican professional golfer
- Julio Asad (born 1953), Argentine former footballer and manager
- Omar Asad (born 1971), Argentine football manager and former player and current coach
- Nayib Bukele (born 1981), President of El Salvador
- Jorge Cafrune (1937–1978), Argentine folklore singer
- Álvaro Fayad (1946–1986), Colombian guerrilla
- Claudio García (1963), Argentine footballer and manager
- Andrés Gil (musician) (born 1948), Colombian musician, songwriter, and teacher
- Claudio Husaín (born 1974), Argentine footballer
- Hugo Maradona (1969–2021), Argentine footballer and coach
- Carlos Menem (1930–2021), Argentine former president and senator
- Antonio Mohamed (born 1970), Argentine former footballer and current manager
- Toprak Razgatlıoğlu (born 1996), Turkish motorcycle racer
- Marcelo Sajen (1965–2004), Argentine serial rapist
- El Turco (guide), a 15th-century Native American

== See also ==
- Turk (nickname)
