= Özgentürk =

Özgentürk is a Turkish surname, composed of "Özgen" and "türk". Notable people with this surname include:

- Ali Özgentürk (1945–2025), Turkish film director, screenwriter, and producer
- Nebil Özgentürk (born 1959), Turkish writer, journalist, and director of documentaries
