= John Mason (playwright) =

17th-century English playwright

John Mason was an English playwright, author of the Jacobean revenge tragedy An Excellent Tragedy of Mulleasses the Turke, and Borgias Governour of Florence, commonly referred to as The Turk (play), first published in 1610.

Little of Mason's life is known. An 18th-century writer reported that Mason may have graduated from St Catharine's College, Cambridge in 1606. He owned a half-share of the Whitefriars Theatre, which performed The Turk.
