= Turk's Head (disambiguation) =

Turk's Head is a 2010 French film.

Turk's Head may also refer to:

- Turk's head knot, a decorative knot
- Turk's head brush, a type of cleaning brush
- Turk's Head Building, in Providence, Rhode Island, U.S.
- Turks Head, in Ross Island, Antarctica
- Turk head (heraldry), a heraldic charge
- West Chester, Pennsylvania, which was formerly known as Turk's Head

== See also ==
- Melocactus, or Turk's cap cactus
- Echinocactus horizonthalonius, or Turk's head cactus
- Ferocactus hamatacanthus, or Turk's head
