= Zalaszentgrót =

- Flag Coat of arms

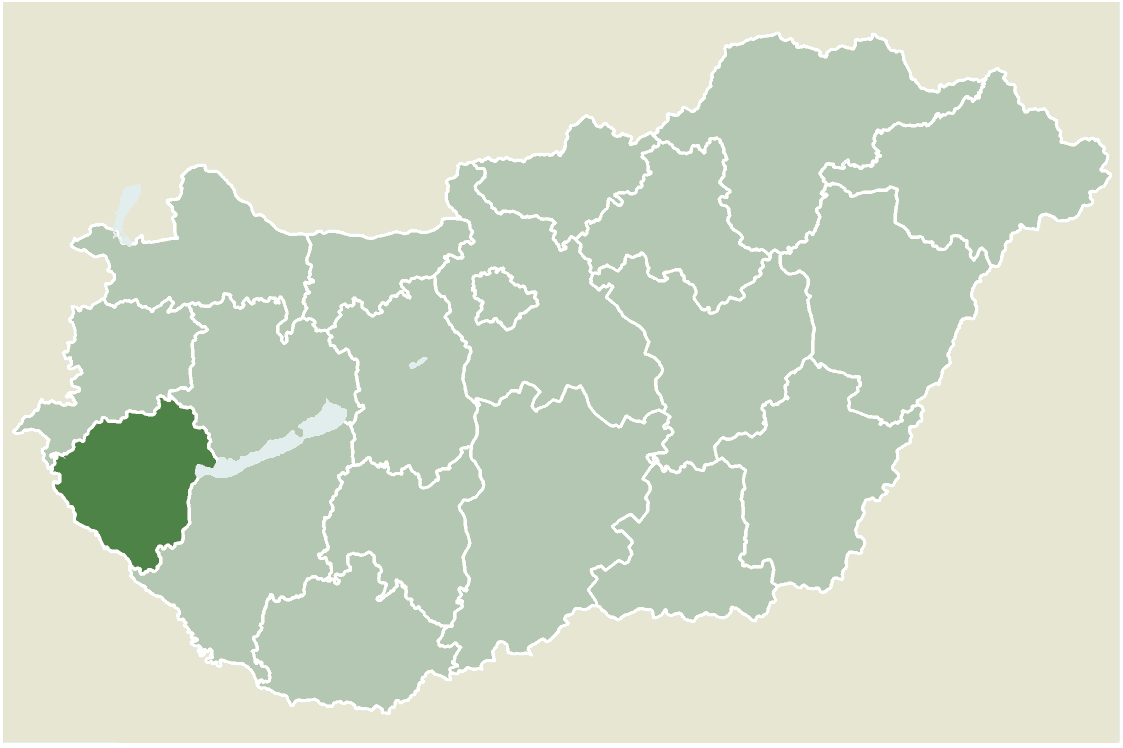
- Location of Zala county in Hungary

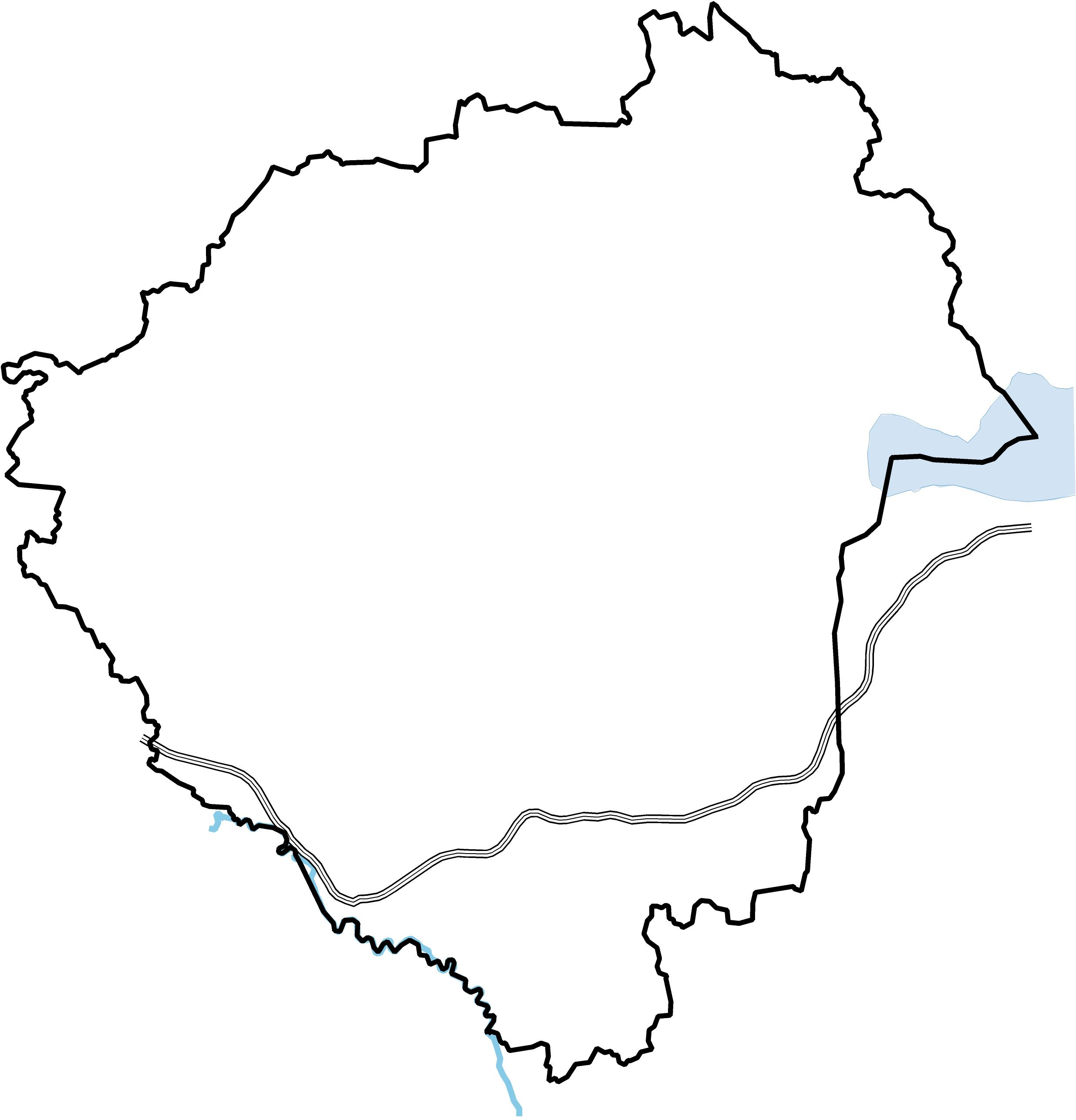
- Location of Zalaszentgrót Zalaszentgrót (Hungary)
- Coordinates: 46.94040°N 17.08138°E
- Country: Hungary
- County: Zala County

Area
  - Total: 81.62 km^{2} (31.51 sq mi)

Population (2019)
  - Total: 6,172
  - Density: 75.62/km^{2} (195.9/sq mi)
- Time zone: UTC+1 (CET)
  - Summer (DST): UTC+2 (CEST)
- Postal code: 8790
- Area code: 83

Zalaszentgrót is a town in Zala County, Hungary. The settlement incorporates the suburbs Kisszentgrót, Tüskeszentpéter, Csáford, Zalakoppány, Zalaudvarnok and Aranyod.

== Twin towns – sister cities ==
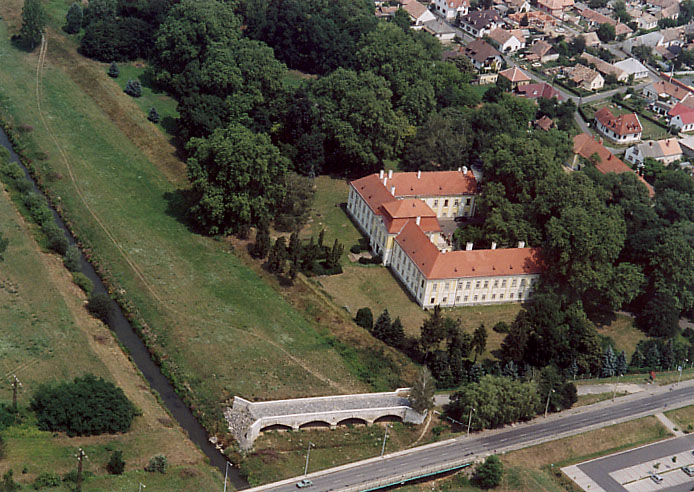
Aerial view of Zalaszentgrót

Zalaszentgrót is twinned with:

- Germersheim, Germany
- Lindås, Norway
- Merkinė, Lithuania
