= Turck (disambiguation) =

Turck is a German manufacturing company.

Turck may also refer to:

- Turck, Kansas, a place in the United States
- Eliza Turck (1832–1891), English painter and writer
- Ludwig Türck (1810–1868), Austrian neurologist

== See also ==
- Turk (disambiguation)
