= Gyula Bezerédi =

Hungarian sculptor

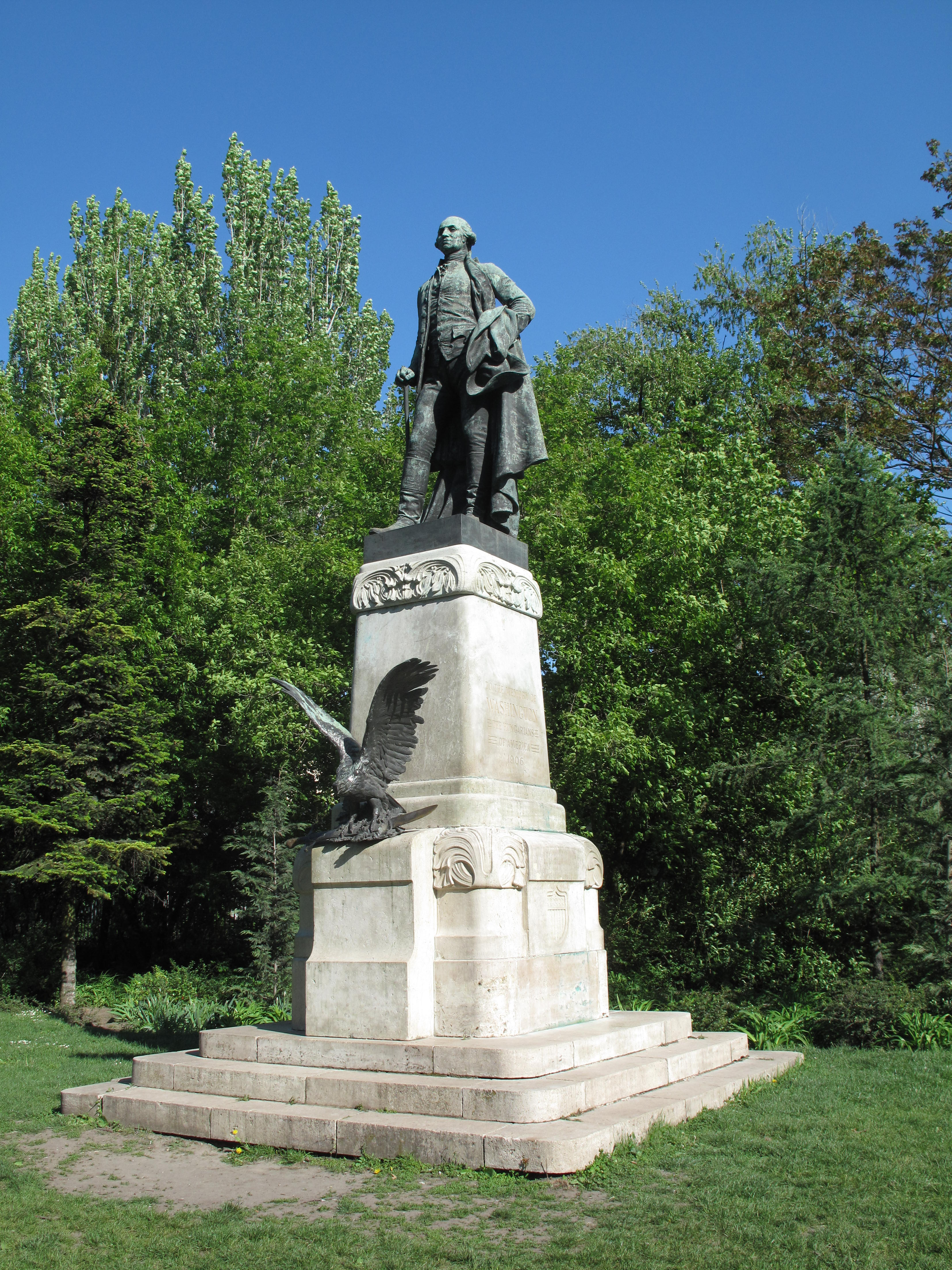
Statue of Washington by Gyula Bezerédi

Gyula Bezerédi (1858–1925) was a prolific Hungarian sculptor, best remembered in the United States for his 1906 statue of George Washington in Budapest.
