= Tolga Özgen =

Turkish footballer

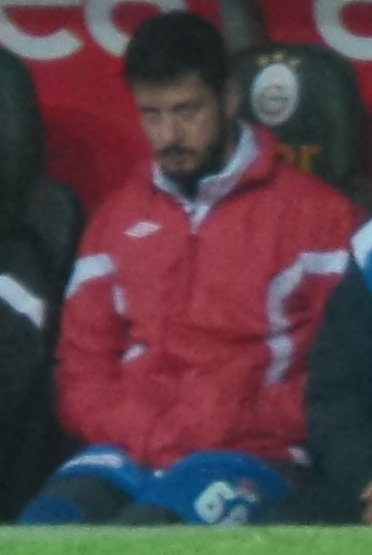
- Tolga Özgen

Personal information
- Full name: Tolga Özgen
- Date of birth: February 28, 1980 (age 46)
- Place of birth: Ankara, Turkey
- Height: 1.98 m (6 ft 6 in)
- Position: Goalkeeper

Youth career
- 1999–2000: Gençlerbirliği

Senior career*
Years	Team	Apps	(Gls)
2000–2003	İnegölspor	36	(0)
2003–2006	İstanbul B.B.	25	(0)
2005–2006	→ Giresunspor (loan)	8	(0)
2006	→ Kasımpaşa (loan)	11	(0)
2006–2012	Kasımpaşa	63	(0)
2013	Elazığspor	0	(0)
2013–2014	Gaziantep B.B.	21	(0)
2014–2015	Adana Demirspor	4	(0)

International career
2008	Turkey A2	1	(0)
- * Club domestic league appearances and goals as of 6 September 2015

Tolga Özgen (born 28 February 1980) is a Turkish professional football goalkeeper.

Özgen began his career with local club with Gençlerbirliği. In 2000, he was transferred to İnegölspor. İstanbul Büyükşehir Belediyespor transferred him in 2003. He was loaned out to Giresunspor and Kasımpaşa during the 2005–06 season. Kasımpaşa transferred him in 2006.
