= Michał Turkiewicz =

Polish politician (1956–2021)

Michał Turkiewicz (25 November 1956 – 17 September 2021) was a Polish politician.

A native of Sulików, Lower Silesian Voivodeship, Turkiewicz moved to Lubań as an adult, and began his political career there. He joined the Polish United Workers' Party (PZPR) in 1978, and remained a party member until its dissolution. In the 1980s, Turkiewicz began working for the PZPR's Lubań branch, and served as vice chair of the municipal party council from 1988 to 1990. He then became a teacher until 2001 when he was elected deputy mayor of Lubań. That year, Turkiewicz was also elected to the Sejm on the Democratic Left Alliance ticket, where he served until 2005. Turkiewicz was a Lubań city councilor from 2010 to his death on 17 September 2021.
