= Taybah al-Turki =

Taybah al-Turki طيبة التركي
- Village
- Location in Syria
- Coordinates: 35.2400°N 36.9350°E
- Country: Syria
- Governorate: Hama
- District: Salamiyah District
- Subdistrict: Salamiyah Subdistrict

Population (2004)
  - Total: 361
- Time zone: UTC+3 (AST)
- City Qrya Pcode: C3232

Taybah al-Turki (Arabic: طيبة التركي, romanized: Taybā al-Turkī) is a village in central Syria, administratively part of the Salamiyah District of the Hama Governorate. According to the Syria Central Bureau of Statistics (CBS), Taybah al-Turki had a population of 361 in the 2004 census.
