= Matt Turk (musician) =

American singer-songwriter

Matt Turk is a singer/songwriter, multi-instrumentalist and veteran performer based in the Hudson Valley in New York State. He performs around the world both as a bandleader and an acoustic folk troubadour.

== Early life and education ==
Turk grew up in Westchester County, New York and attended New York University, graduating Cum Laude with a B.A. in history and a minor in religious studies.

== Career ==
At NYU he formed the band, The Hour, which played alongside Blues Traveler, Dave Matthews and the Spin Doctors. His band was a regular act at the Arrowhead Ranch, a music venue promoted by rock impresario Bill Graham.

In June 1992, Turk teamed up with Pete Seeger as part of The Street Singers, a group that taught folk songs to schoolchildren and adults in and around New York City. Turk's time with Seeger, and his year and a half stint working for God's Love We Deliver, delivering food to folks homebound with AIDS, led him to write songs about social justice.

Turk recorded with Pete Seeger and opened for Judy Collins, the Grateful Dead's Mickey Hart, Fiona Apple, and The Doobie Brothers.

Turk has created a number of solo albums, and performed on a number of others. His 2010 recording, American Preservation, produced by David Dobkin, placed at Number #20 on the folk/dj charts and is a collection of traditional standards and classics, ranging from Roy Acuff to Pink Floyd, and from Taj Mahal to T. Rex. His version of "America the Beautiful" with Gaby Moreno has been called "arguably the definitive acoustic version" by Music News Nashville.

Turk's 2014 album, Cold Revival, attracted a number of positive reviews, including being named "Best album of 2014" by RUST magazine. As of 2020 Matt serves as the music director at Temple B’nai Jeshurun in Short Hills New Jersey

== Selected discography ==
Solo

- Cold Revival
- American Preservation, 2010
- Fred Claus Soundtrack, Warner Brothers Records, 2007
- The Fog of War, 2007 special guest Pete Seeger
- Washington Arms, 2006
- What Gives, 2002
- Turktunes, 1999

Session Musician

- Pete Seeger The Storm King, 2013 *Grammy Nominated
- Pete Seeger, Lorre Wyatt A More Perfect Union 2012
- Hope Machine, Big Green Hope Machine, 2009

Band Member

- Gillen & Turk, Back's to the Wall, 2008
- Mandolin Caravan, Desert Soul, 2003
- The Hour, Songs of Sweden, 1992
- The Hour, Fricker-Nicker Sessions, 1991
- The Hour, Hold Back The Reins, 1989
