= Homaidan Al-Turki =

Saudi Arabian convicted of rape in the U.S.

Homaidan Ali Al-Turki (Arabic: حميدان علي التركي; born 1969) is a Saudi national convicted in a Colorado court of sexually assaulting his Indonesian housekeeper and keeping her as a virtual slave for four years. On August 31, 2006, Al-Turki was sentenced to 28 years in prison on twelve felony counts of false imprisonment, unlawful sexual contact, theft and criminal extortion. On February 25, 2011, he was re-sentenced from 28 to eight years for his good behavior in prison. Al-Turki maintains his innocence and blames anti-Muslim sentiment for the charges that led to his 2006 conviction and sentence in a case that has strained relations between the U.S. and the Saudi government.

== Background ==
Born and raised in Saudi Arabia, Homaidan Ali Al-Turki moved to the United States with his family in 1995, after receiving an academic scholarship from the Imam Muhammad ibn Saud Islamic University in Riyadh to pursue a PhD in linguistics from the University of Colorado at Boulder. After successfully earning a master's degree with honors, Al-Turki was completing a linguistics doctorate program at the University of Colorado, specializing in Arabic intonation and focus prosody. A father of five, Al-Turki and his wife Sarah Al-Khonaizan were active members of Denver's Muslim community. Additionally, Al-Turki operated Al-Basheer Publications and Translations, a well-known Arabic language translation and publishing house based in Aurora, Colorado.

== Arrest ==
Legal problems for Homaidan Al-Turki and his wife began on November 18, 2004, when they were arrested with their Indonesian housekeeper by U.S. Immigration and Customs Enforcement agents because of questions regarding his student visa validity. Al-Turki operated a publishing-translation business and authorities suspected it might violate student visa prohibitions of employment. Accusations against the couple by their housekeeper appeared while she was in police custody. In interviews with law officers, the woman claimed she suffered four-years of captivity, exploitation and abuse at the hands of the Al-Turki family.

=== Bail hearing ===
On July 29, 2005, Colorado U.S. District Judge Walker Miller overruled a magistrate who declared Al-Turki a flight risk, allowing release while charges against him are pending if $400,000 cash bail is posted. The entire $400,000 must be deposited to guarantee appearance at future court proceedings. Defense attorney John Richilano contacted Al-Turki's brother in Saudi Arabia with news of Miller's ruling. The brother, who is a doctor, said the family would help raise money. Defense attorney Dan Recht estimated the couple's total cost of freedom while charges are pending was $1 million, including: Al-Turki's $400,000 bail in Arapahoe County District Court, provided by the Saudi government: $400,000 in federal court: $25,000 to $50,000 bond to immigration court: and his wife's $150,000 bail. An FBI agent working the case testified that Al-Turki borrowed over $200,000 for his business from three friends who attended his mosque but had repaid only about $53,000 of it. Miller further ordered that Al-Turki be placed on electronic monitoring, avoid all potential witnesses in the case except his wife, remain in Colorado and not seek deportation through the U.S. immigration agency.

== District Court trial ==
Arapahoe County District Court initiated criminal trial proceedings against Homaidan Al-Turki and Sarah Khonaizan on February 16, 2006, with the defendants both entering not-guilty pleas. Prosecutor Ann Tomsic began the state's case by explaining how the couple brought the young Indonesian woman to the U.S. from Saudi Arabia to work as a housekeeper when she was a teenager. The affidavit states her domestic services included child care, cooking, and cleaning for 12-hours a day, seven days a week without time-off from 2000 to 2004. While not working, she was confined to an unheated basement and repeatedly sexually assaulted by Homaidan Al-Turki. Tomsic added that the woman was allowed out of the house alone only to remove trash, bring in mail and clean the yard. Prosecutors claimed the couple intentionally created a climate of fear and intimidation through aggravated sexual abuse, which was intended to cause the victim to believe disobedience would result in serious harm. The couple also allegedly threatened the victim with abuse of law and the legal process, confiscating her Indonesian passport and visa for the purpose of obtaining labor for little or no pay.

=== Defense argument ===
Defense attorney John Richilano argued the federal government only filed fraudulent sex-slave charges after failing to make a terrorism case against Al-Turki. They claimed Mr. Al-Turki was under FBI-investigation on possible terrorism links before his arrest. Federal court documents filed by the defense show that the Denver Joint Terrorism Task Force had Al-Turki under a "full fledge investigation" suspecting "he is closely aligned to terrorists and may be providing material support to terrorism." Evidence also indicated a federal investigation of proceeds from Al-Basheer Publications. They highlighted an incident from April 2005 in Illinois, when state police stopped Al-Turki on Interstate 80 near LaSalle. A message on the national crime information computer warned the officers "terrorist organization member - caution, do not alert this individual to this notice." His lawyers claim school documents in his car were removed, copied and faxed by the Illinois State Police to the Denver FBI. The U.S. Attorney's Office responded by maintaining that the terrorism investigation was totally unrelated to the victims allegations.

=== Cultural bias argument ===
A strategy utilized by the defense contended that Turki's Arabian cultural norms are alien to most Westerners, and hence, vulnerable to prejudice and cultural bias. For example, court documents filed by Al-Turki's lawyers illustrated that "there are Saudi Arabian customs regarding a host family's retention of funds for their domestic servant until she leaves their service."

In his testimony, Al-Turki denied any wrongdoing and said authorities had targeted him because of his religion. He insisted that the woman was treated the same way any observant Muslim family would treat their daughter and defended his actions to District Judge Justin Mark Hannen, saying that:

The restrictions placed on her contact with non-relative males were also the same as those applicable to my daughters and other Muslim women in our community. You cannot ask somebody from a different religion to be American to the fullest. You cannot ask them to go dancing, go to the bars. We are Muslim. We are different. The state has criminalized these basic Muslim behaviors. Attacking traditional Muslim behaviors is a focal point of the prosecution.

— Homaidan Al-Turki, District Court Testimony

However, Prosecution lawyer Natalie Decker adamantly contested the accuracy of this statement, stressing that the trial proceedings had nothing to do with the defendants beliefs or ethnicity and instead "has to do with what he did to her (the maid) for five years" and that Mr. Al-Turki's actions represented "a clear-cut example of human trafficking." The prosecution also pointed out that the alleged victim, the Indonesian maid, is also a Muslim. Responding to rising accusations of cultural bias, prosecution attorney Ann Tomsic requested that Judge Hannen should strive to treat Al-Turki as he would any American citizen who committed similar crimes. Tomsic further emphasized that "the world is listening, and the court needs to make a statement that in the United States, or at least in...(Colorado), this kind of slavery will not be tolerated."

=== Conviction and sentencing ===
After two and a half weeks, Homaidan Ali Al-Turki's criminal trial concluded on June 30, 2006. In the end, a jury of citizens from Arapahoe County convicted him on twelve felony counts of unlawful sexual contact with force, one felony count of theft of services over $15,000, and two misdemeanor counts of false imprisonment and conspiracy to commit false imprisonment. On August 31, 2006, he received a sentence of twenty-eight years-to-life in state prison by Judge Mark Hannen.

=== Appeal attempts ===
On January 22, 2009, it was announced that the Colorado Court of Appeals upheld Homaidan Al-Turki's conviction, ruling that the trial court correctly set certain limits during jury selection and that the jury's findings were supported by evidence.

Following the decision, family spokesman Fahd Al-Nasar, announced to the Saudi Gazette that six American law firms had been retained and they planned to appeal the verdict with the Colorado Supreme Court. Nasar added he was surprised to hear the Appeal decision only two weeks after the initial hearing, since he assumed this type of case required a minimum of at least four to six weeks. The Al-Turki family indicated they were hopeful that diplomatic efforts from the Saudi embassy in Washington, D.C. would assist in influencing the legal outcome.

== Post-conviction ==
After reaching an agreement with prosecutors, Al-Turki's wife, Sarah Khonaizan, pleaded guilty to reduced charges in both state and federal courts. She was sentenced to home detention and probation in the federal case and two months in jail for the state case. On September 1, 2006, she was transferred to the custody of federal immigration officials and according to her attorney, Forrest Lewis, she agreed to not fight deportation proceedings. Sarah arrived in Riyadh on September 22, 2006, with her two children and immediately issued a press statement, signed by Hamad Al-Khonaizan, Sarah's brother, blaming anti-Muslim sentiment in the U.S. for Al-Turki's prosecution. According to the statement, the primary factor behind her husband's imprisonment was his successful efforts at preaching Islamic dawah.

After the state conviction, federal charges of forced labor, document servitude and harboring an illegal immigrant were dropped. In its motion, the U.S. Attorney's office said that dropping the federal charges was done in hopes of sparing the victim from having to testify again about "the most intimate personal matters." Judge Walker D. Miller added the U.S. attorney's decision to drop federal charges was "in no way a statement regarding the strength of the government's case."

While incarcerated, Mr. Al-Turki claims he was offered a bargain-deal by U.S. authorities which included deportation to Saudi Arabia and employment as an undercover FBI operative. In a video interview posted on YouTube, Al-Turki states he is being mistreated in prison as well as his wife, who he further contends had her hijab (head scarf) forcibly removed from her head during the trial. According to cultural norms in Saudi Arabia, the removal of a woman's head scarf is considered an extreme insult.

== Fact as stated to the US Supreme Court ==
Statement of facts from United States Supreme Court Brief, references are to volume and page numbers in the actual trial transcript:

=== Statement of the Case and Facts ===
In June 1999, Mr. Al-Turki and his wife/co-Defendant [Sarah Khonaizan] brought Z.A., a 17-year-old Muslim girl from a village in Indonesia, to Saudi Arabia to work for them as a domestic servant at a salary of 600 Saudi riyals (approximately $150) per month (Record 18:60-61, 71-75, 99-100, 102).

In September 2000, the Al-Turkis brought Z.A. to the U.S. (Record 18:124). She was admitted to stay until March 9, 2001, as a "personal or domestic employee." The Al-Turkis kept Z.A.'s passport but failed to renew it, while repeatedly warning her that if she left them she would be arrested (Record 21:28). They also strictly controlled her communications, disallowing her to write letters to her friends (Record 21:80; 22:49; 23:28, 132-134).

Mr. Al-Turki misrepresented Z.A.'s visa status and employment situation to his friends (Record 25:88-89, 262, 307). He also falsely told his secretary at his bookstore that Z.A. was married to a driver in Saudi Arabia (Record 25:184-85). Z.A. was instructed to say that her salary was $800 per month(Record 18:122). In August 2004, she was told that if she was contacted by authorities she should tell them that she had two days off every week, and that her salary was sent to Indonesia (Record 21:73-74,99).

On November 18, 2004, following FBI investigations of Mr. Al-Turki, Z.A. was arrested for overstaying her permit. Mr. Al-Turki and his wife were also arrested for harboring an illegal alien. Initially, Z.A. told authorities what she had been instructed to say by the Al-Turkis regarding her employment situation. Eventually, however, she told the truth, including the fact that she had been paid only $1500 during her entire stay in the United States. She also revealed that Defendant had sexually abused her on a regular basis. [Based on minimum wage, the value of Z.A.'s services during the last three years of her work for the Al-Turkis was $96,044.92 (Env. #6, People's Exh.87a 5162).]

At trial, Z.A. provided a detailed account of Mr. Al-Turki's sexual misconduct. According to her, about once every two weeks, Mr. Al-Turki would go to her room in the basement at night and sexually molest her, including digitally penetrating her and forcing her to perform oral sex on him (Record 19:21-22, 26, 65, 97, 99, 102; 21:41). During the last incident of sexual abuse, which occurred approximately two weeks before Z.A.'s arrest, Mr. Al-Turki, for the first time, had sexual intercourse with Z.A., who was still a virgin (Record 21:44-46).

Afterwards, Z.A. confronted Mr. Al-Turki with a blood-stained tissue, expressing fear that she would become pregnant (Record 21:45). Three days later, Mr. Al-Turki told Z.A. not to worry, that he would not have sexual intercourse with her again, and that she should tell him if she missed her period (Record 21:48). Z.A. kept a diary describing Mr. Al-Turki's sexual abuses. However, prior to Z.A.'s arrest, Mr. Al-Turki told her to destroy it, which she did (Record 21:75-76; 23:109-10).

Two married Muslim women described Mr. Al-Turki's similar acts of sexual misconduct against them, including touching their genitalia and breasts (Record 24:160-71, 180-99).

Mr. Al-Turki's theory of defense, which is repeated in his petition, was that Z.A., under pressure from the FBI and motivated by the desire to get authorization to stay and work in the U.S., had fabricated the allegations (Record 18:44, 50-51, 53-55; Env. #8, Instruction 32). However, Z.A. had disclosed Mr. Al-Turki's abusive conduct to a friend of hers, a Mr. Al-Resheid, more than a year before any contact with the authorities (Record 19:105-06) . [ Mr. Al-Resheid, a subpoenaed witness for the prosecution, left the U.S. on August 16, 2005, and never returned (Record 20:52-54).]

Z.A. never asked for assistance to stay in the U.S. (Record 25:171). Moreover, under the 2000 Trafficking and Violence Protection Act, Z.A. automatically qualified for "continued presence" status, which allowed her to stay and work in the U.S. (Record 25:119-20, 122,125-26), and the process to establish her "continued presence" status started long before she revealed the sexual abuse (Record 25:125). Finally, the FBI agent who helped Z.A. with filling out her necessary forms signed them on April 4, 2005, three days before her revelation (Record Env. #7, Deft's Exhs. E, F; 25:172-88).

Mr. Al-Turki was convicted of false imprisonment, conspiracy to commit false imprisonment, felony unlawful sexual contact (12 counts), criminal extortion, and theft (Record 4: 872-99). He was sentenced to concurrent terms of 20 years to life for the unlawful sexual contacts, an eight-year consecutive term for theft, and shorter terms on the remaining charges to run concurrently with the theft sentence (Record 4:901-02; 5:1250-55; 29:73-76; Supp. Record 31-34).

On appeal, Mr. Al-Turki challenged his convictions on various grounds. In an unpublished opinion, the Colorado Court of Appeals affirmed Mr. Al-Turki's convictions. People v. Al-Turki, 06CA2104, January 22, 2009 (Petition, App. 1a-29a). The Colorado Supreme Court denied certiorari review. Al-Turki v. People, 2009 WL 2916999 (Colo. No. 09SC326, September 14, 2009) (Petition App. 30a-31a).

On April 5, 2010, the United States Supreme Court denied Mr. Al-Turki's Petition for Certiorari.

== International reaction ==
The Homaidan Al-Turki case sparked controversy and high-profile attention from Muslims worldwide, particularly in the Kingdom of Saudi Arabia, where local media portrayed him as a victim of bias against Muslims and said he would not have been convicted of these crimes had he been tried in his native country. For example, in a show of support, the Saudi government provided Al-Turki with $400,000 to post bond. In November 2006, Colorado Attorney General John Suthers travelled to Saudi Arabia where he visited King Abdullah, Crown Prince Sultan, and Al-Turki's family in an attempt to clear up "misperceptions" about the U.S. judicial system and ease the Saudi royal family's concerns over whether Homaidan Al-Turki was treated fairly. Suthers went there at the request of the U.S. ambassador in Saudi Arabia, who had the State Department contact Colorado Governor Bill Owens. The trip was sponsored and paid for by the U.S. State Department.

Even years after the case was closed, the issue continues to arouse powerful emotions in Saudi Arabia and affect the delicate balance of Saudi-US foreign relations. Saleh Bin-Humaid, chairman of the Consultative Assembly of Saudi Arabia (Shoura Council), brought up Al-Turki's case during an official meeting with the US Secretary of Homeland Security Michael Chertoff in Riyadh on March 26, 2009, when he urged Americans to review the topic. According to a public statement from Bin-Humaid, "The Saudi people sympathize with Homaidan Al-Turki and they closely follow up his case."

== Further proceedings ==
=== Reduction of sentence ===
After a hearing before District Judge J. Mark Hannen in the Colorado District Court in Arapahoe County on February 25, 2011 Al-Turki's sentence was reduced to 8 years to life, making him eligible for parole soon. The Court cited his good behavior in prison. The hearing was granted due to a decision in another case which held that excessive minimum sentences had been imposed on some sex-offenders. A letter from the Saudi ambassador to the United States was considered by the court. Parole may be conditioned on Al-Turki's progress in the prison system's rehabilitation programs for sex-offenders.

=== Denial of request to serve remainder in home country ===
On March 12, 2013, Al-Turki's request to be sent to his home country to serve out his sentence was denied by the Colorado Department of Corrections on the grounds that state law requires sex offenders to undergo treatment while in prison and that al-Turki had declined to participate. The assassination of Colorado Department of Corrections executive director Tom Clements at his residence in Monument, Colorado on March 20, 2013 prompted attention to the case of Al-Turki. On March 21, 2013, the Department of Corrections announced that Homaidan al-Turki had been moved into an isolation cell for his own protection. On March 22, 2013, Evan Spencer Ebel, a prison parolee, was connected as the probable suspect in Clements' shooting after he was killed in a shootout with police in Decatur, Wise County, northern Texas. The Northeast Denver Islamic Center Imam Abdur-Rahim Ali objected to the media attention on Al-Turki in the ongoing investigation into Clements' murder.

== Deportation ==
In May 2025, he was moved from prison to the custody of ICE, and in August, he was sent back to Saudi Arabia via airplane.
