= Al-Turk =

al-Turk or el-Turk and their variant casings, are portions of Arabic names, often adopted as a last name (or treated as such) in Western contexts.

It may refer to:

- Hala Al Turk (born 2002), Bahraini child singer
- Ishaq al-Turk (fl. 8th century), Persian religious leader
- Ismail Fatah Al Turk (1934–2004), Iraqi artist
- Mostapha al-Turk (born 1973), British fighter
- Niqula al-Turk (1763–1828), Ottoman scholar, historian and poet, father of Warda al Turk
- Omar El Turk (born 1981), Lebanese basketball player
- Riyad al-Turk (1930–2023), Syrian activist
- Warda al Turk (1797–1873), Ottoman poet, daughter of Niqula al-Turk

== See also ==
- Al-Turki
