= The Turk (play) =

Jacobean revenge tragedy by John Mason

An Excellent Tragedy of Mulleasses the Turke, and Borgias Governour of Florence, commonly referred to as The Turk is Jacobean revenge tragedy by John Mason first published in 1610.
