= Hajdúdorog =

- Town
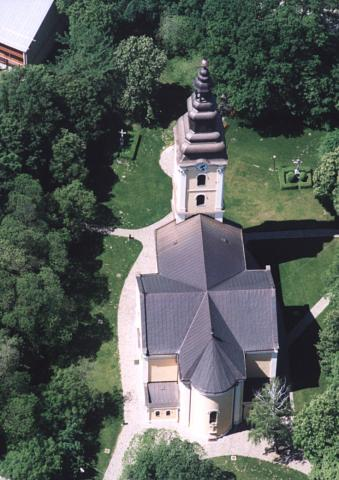
- The Cathedral of Hajdúdorog from above

- Flag Coat of arms

- Location within Hungary
- Coordinates: 47°49′N 21°30′E
- Country: Hungary
- County: Hajdú-Bihar
- District: Hajdúböszörmény

Area
  - Total: 100.65 km^{2} (38.86 sq mi)

Population (2012)
  - Total: 8,888
  - Density: 89.97/km^{2} (233.0/sq mi)
- Time zone: UTC+1 (CET)
  - Summer (DST): UTC+2 (CEST)
- Postal code: 4087
- Area code: (+36) 52
- Website: www.hajdudorog.hu

Hajdúdorog (Hungarian: [ˈhɒjduːdoroɡ]) is a town in Hajdú-Bihar county, in the Northern Great Plain region of eastern Hungary. Hajdúdorog had a population of 8,797 in 2014 (down from 8,888 in 2006), with a population density of 8,997 people per km^{2}. The city is 130 m above sea level and the district area is 100.65 km^{2}.

It was formerly known as Dorog, with added prefix Hajdú from Hajduk.

== History ==
The city is one of the "old hajduk towns" and appears to have been inhabited since Paleolithic times, but the first written records come from 1301. Archaeological remains of the so-called rézbalta culture from 1380 to 2200 BCE have been found in the area as have Iron Age Scythians settlements. Roman era tombs were found in the area in 1938. Sarmatian, Celtic, and Roman tombs were located near the church and the area appears to have been the frontier between Roman and Sarmatian lands at the time.

Avars immigrated into the area in 567 CE and Hungarian Magyars in 896 CE. The Ottoman Empire took the town in 1566 CE, but by the 17th century it was in Habsburg hands.

The City Hall was built around 1660, and remains standing today despite being damaged during World War II. The city was occupied by Nazi Germany during the German occupation of Hungary, and remained as such until the Red Army captured the city on 24 October.

Cholera swept the city in the 19th century and in 1843 Hajdúdorog was divided into the seven municipalities. The town's history is presented in the Museum of Local History.

== Religion ==
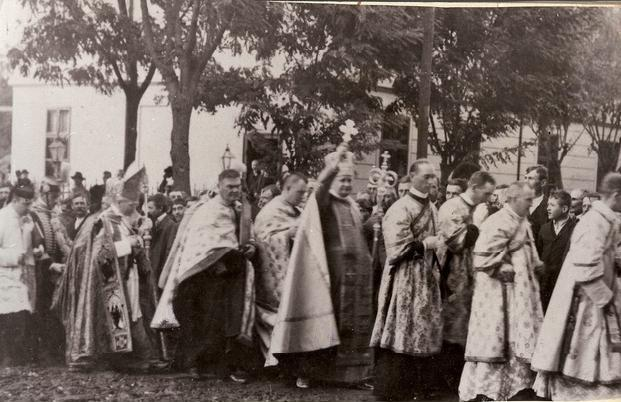
Bishop consecration of István Miklósy (1913)

Traditionally the area was Catholic; however, since the beginning of the 20th century, the majority of the city has been from the Hungarian Greek Catholic Church, in contrast to the surrounding area. The differences in religion have created a distinct local culture.

=== Catholicism ===
The city is the seat of the Hungarian Greek Catholic Archeparchy of Hajdúdorog. The Greek Catholic Cathedral is one of the city's main points of interest with its 200-year-old icons. In 2001, 80.9% of the population of Hajdúdorog was Greek Catholic.

=== Judaism ===
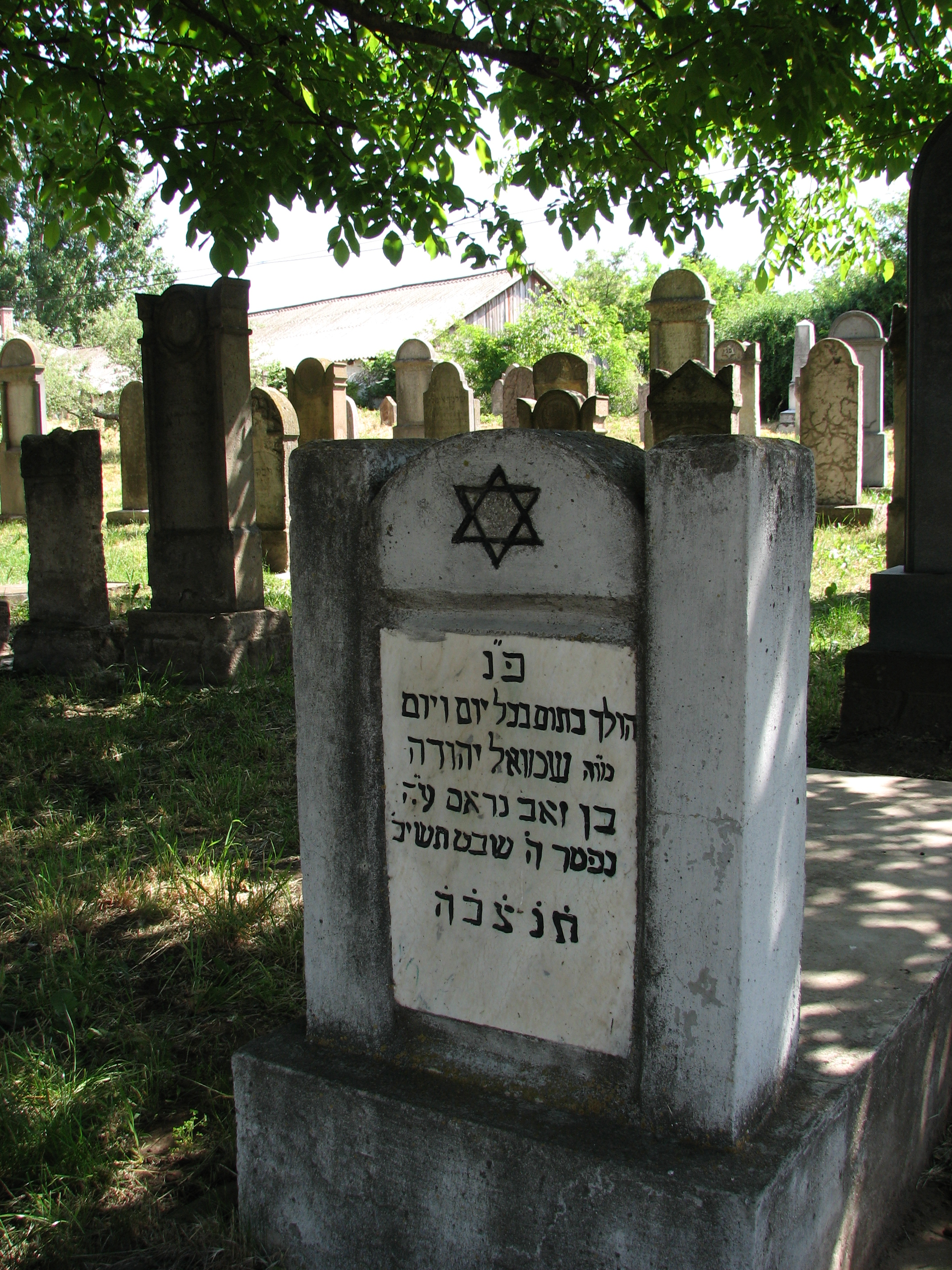
Jewish cemetery, Hajdudorog

Before World War II, the city was home to a large Jewish population, located predominantly in three streets near the edge of town. There had been some antisemitism through the 1930s. When Nazi Germany invaded Hungary on 19 March 1944, Jewish businesses were closed and ghettoisation began. A memorial to the community is located near the centre of the town.

== Geography ==
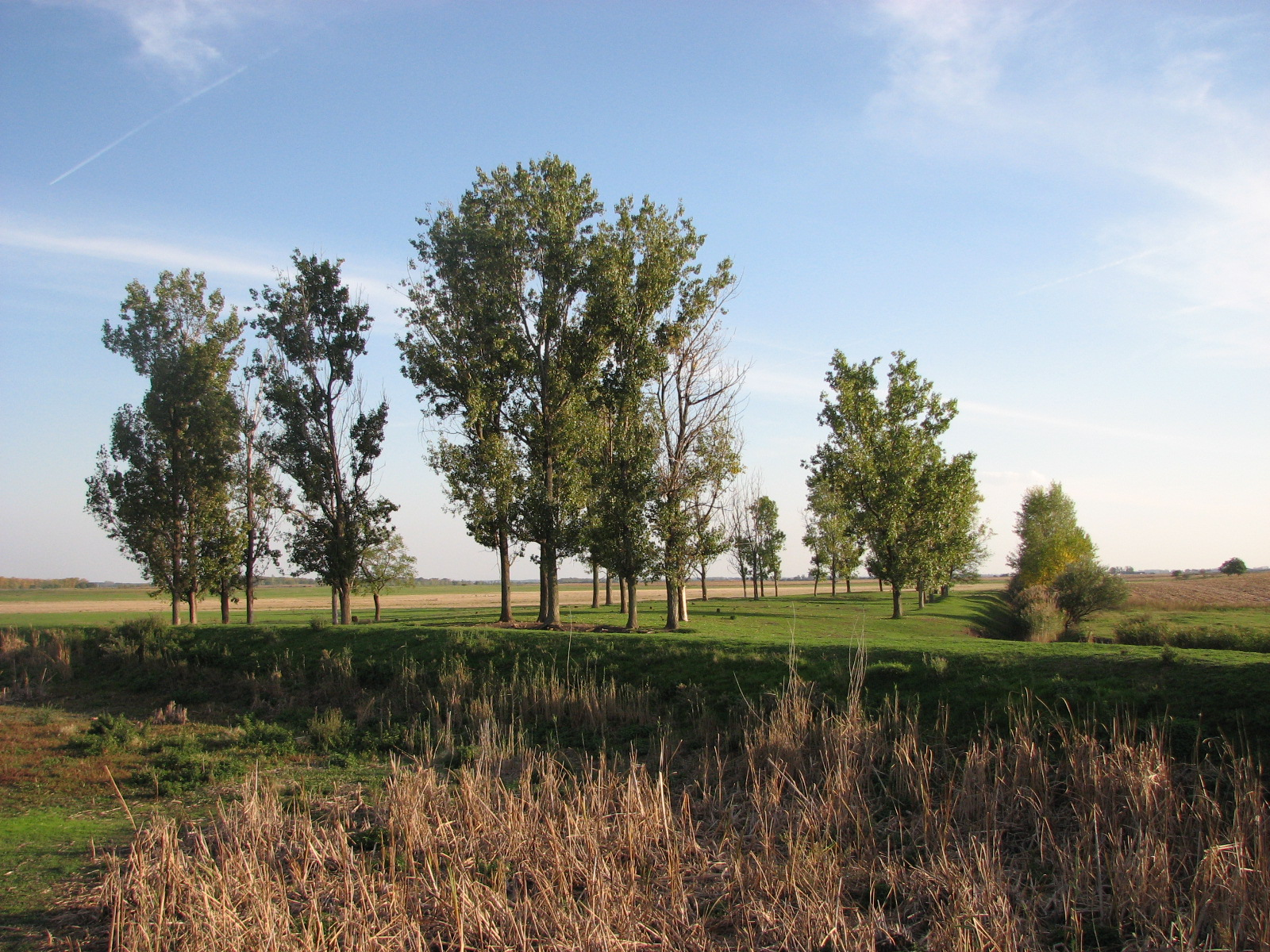
A Zajgató látképe

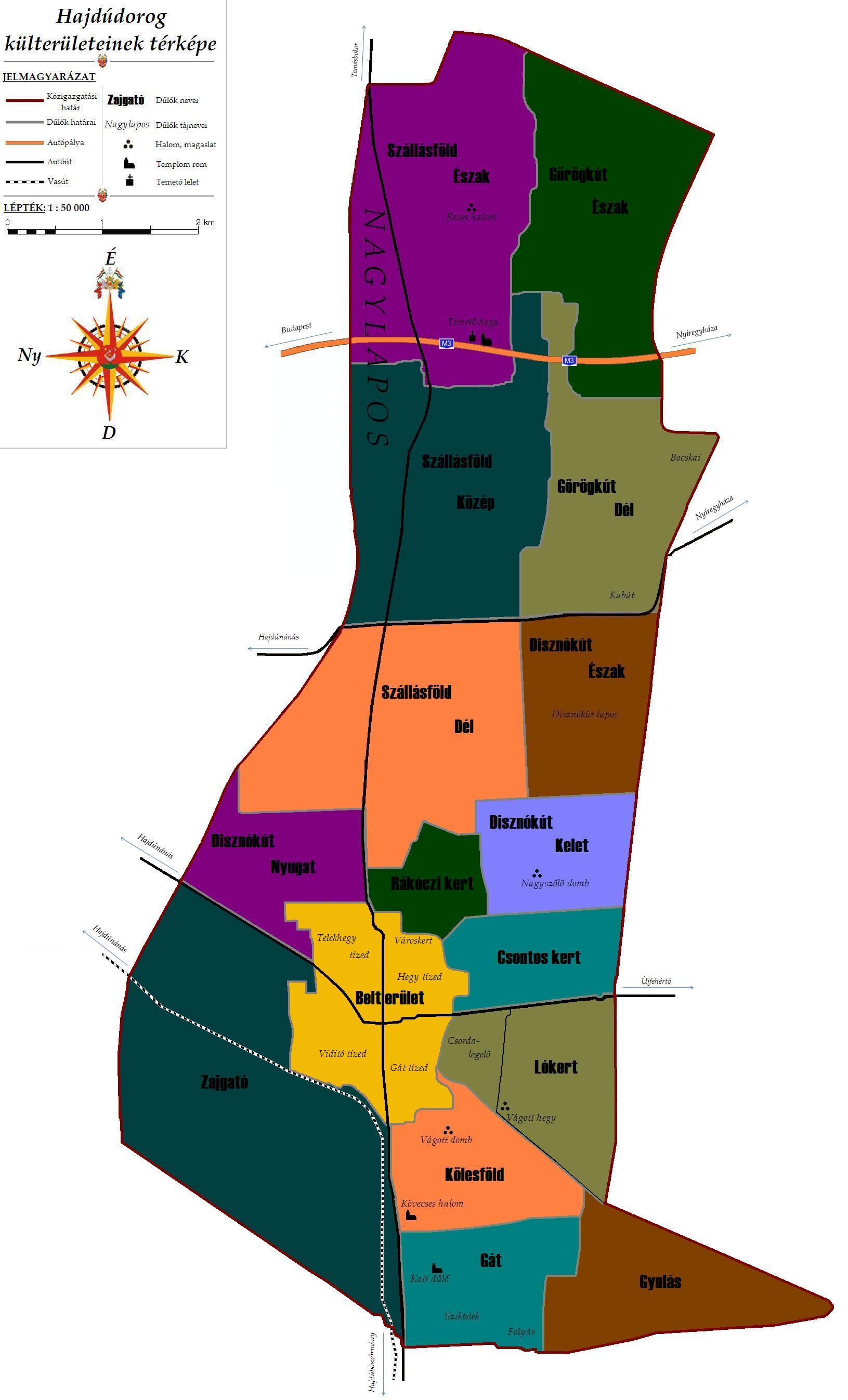
Map of Hajdúdorog

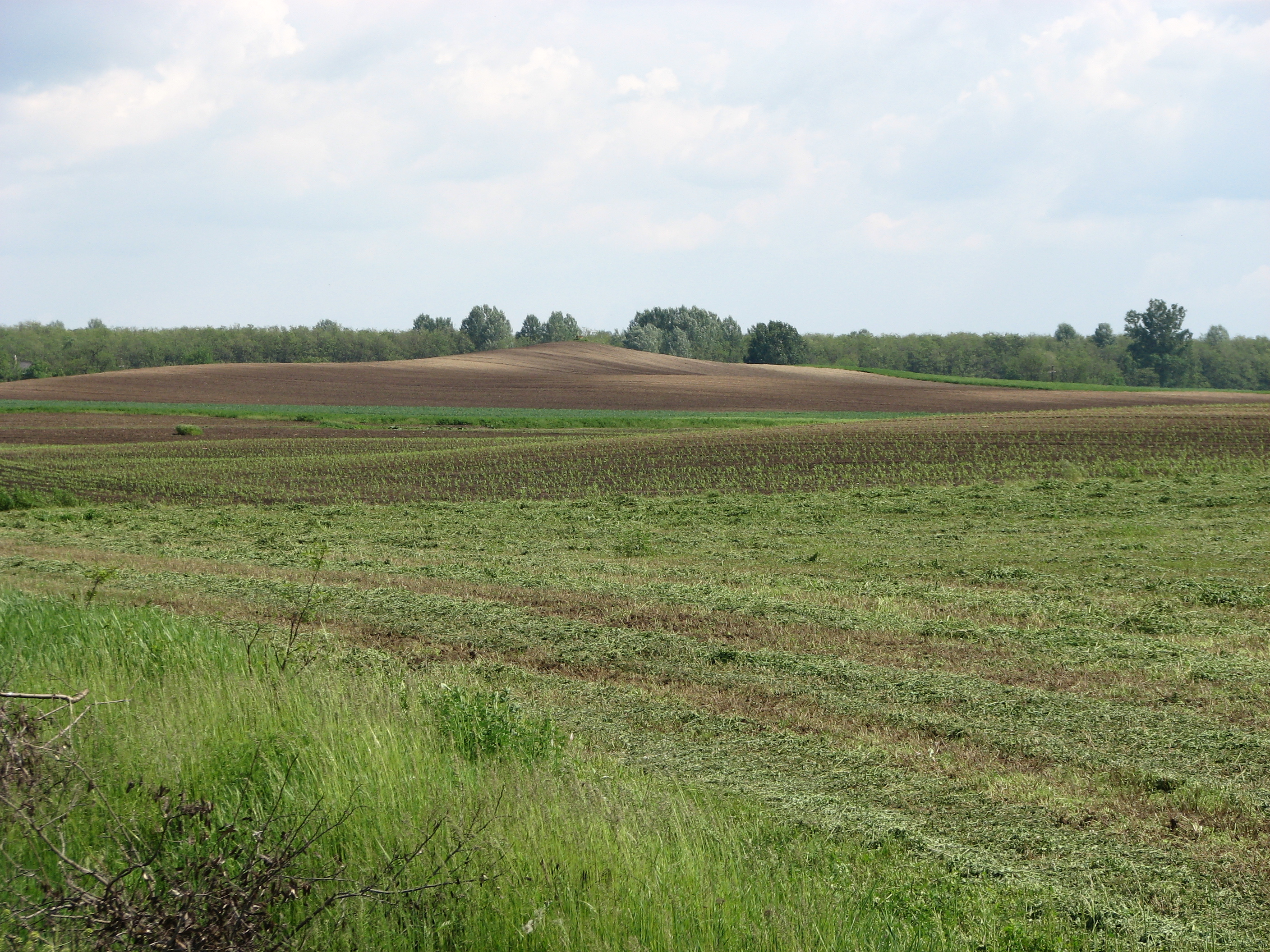
Hajdúdorog legmagasabb pontja, a 162 m magas Debeje-halom

Geographically the town is located in the Northern Great Plains and three different geographical microregions dominate the area:

- Hortobágy
- Hajdúhát
- South-Nyírség

The area is known for its high-quality spa towns, Hajdúdorog medicinal and thermal water gushing to the surface.

The climate is moderately warm, and dry. The wettest month, July, averages 80 mm (3 in), while the driest, January, averages 25.5 mm (1.0 in).

Northwest of Hajdúdorog is a floodplain ecological landscape and to the north is the Tisza River's catchment area, and also the Nagylapos River.

== Economy ==
The region's main source of livelihood, is agriculture, mainly vineyards and agricultural activity related to them and cattle.

== Landmarks ==
- Cathedral of Hajdúdorog
- Iconostasis of the Cathedral of Hajdúdorog
- Central Church fortress
- General Ferenc Móra art school
- the Town Fountain inaugurated in 1984
- The sculpture of István bocskai
- The old Town Hall

== Gallery ==
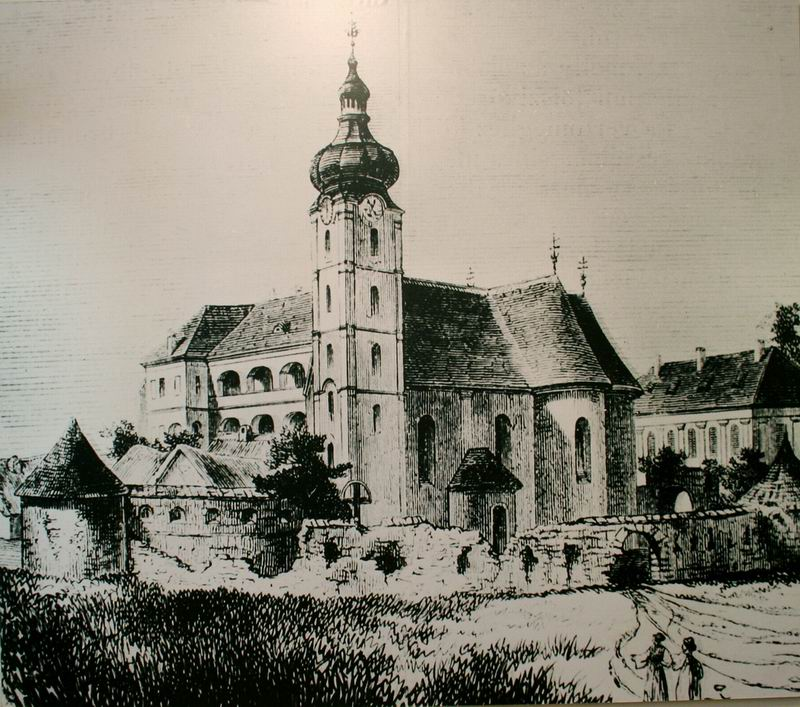
Greek Catholic church, 1859

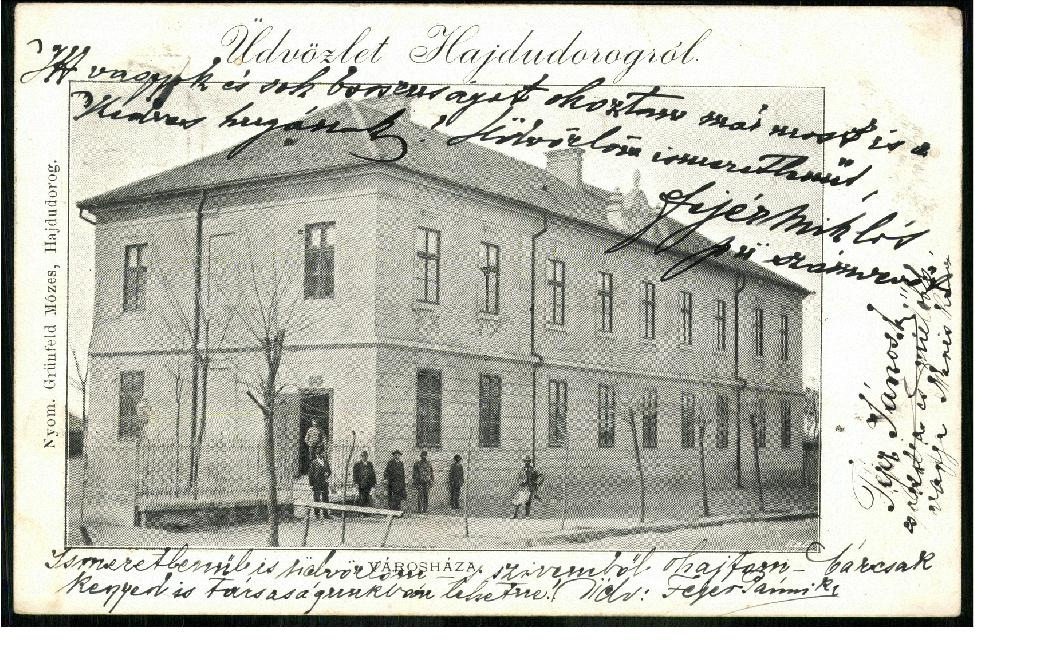
Town Hall, 1900

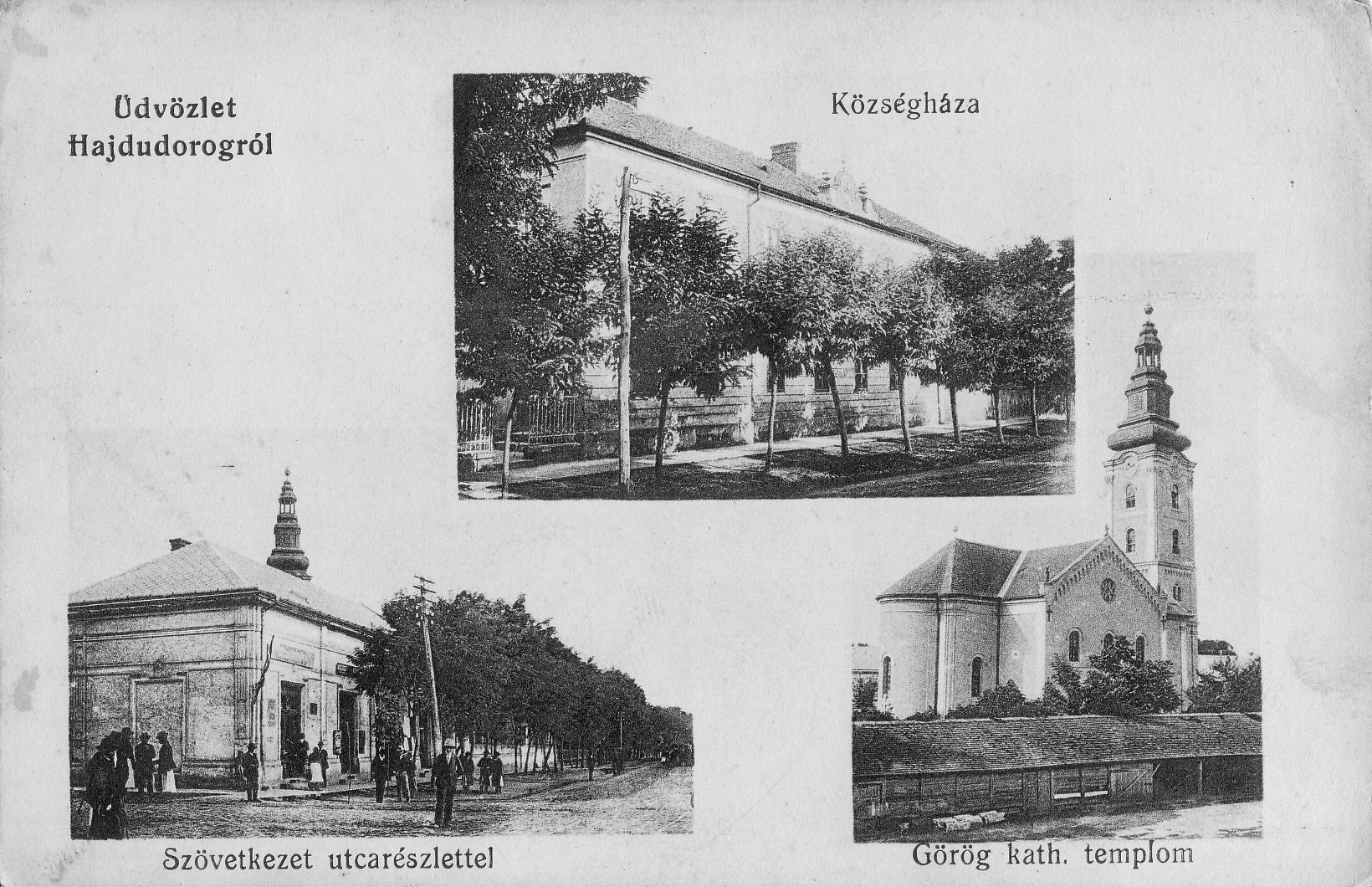
Hajdudorog postcard, 1914

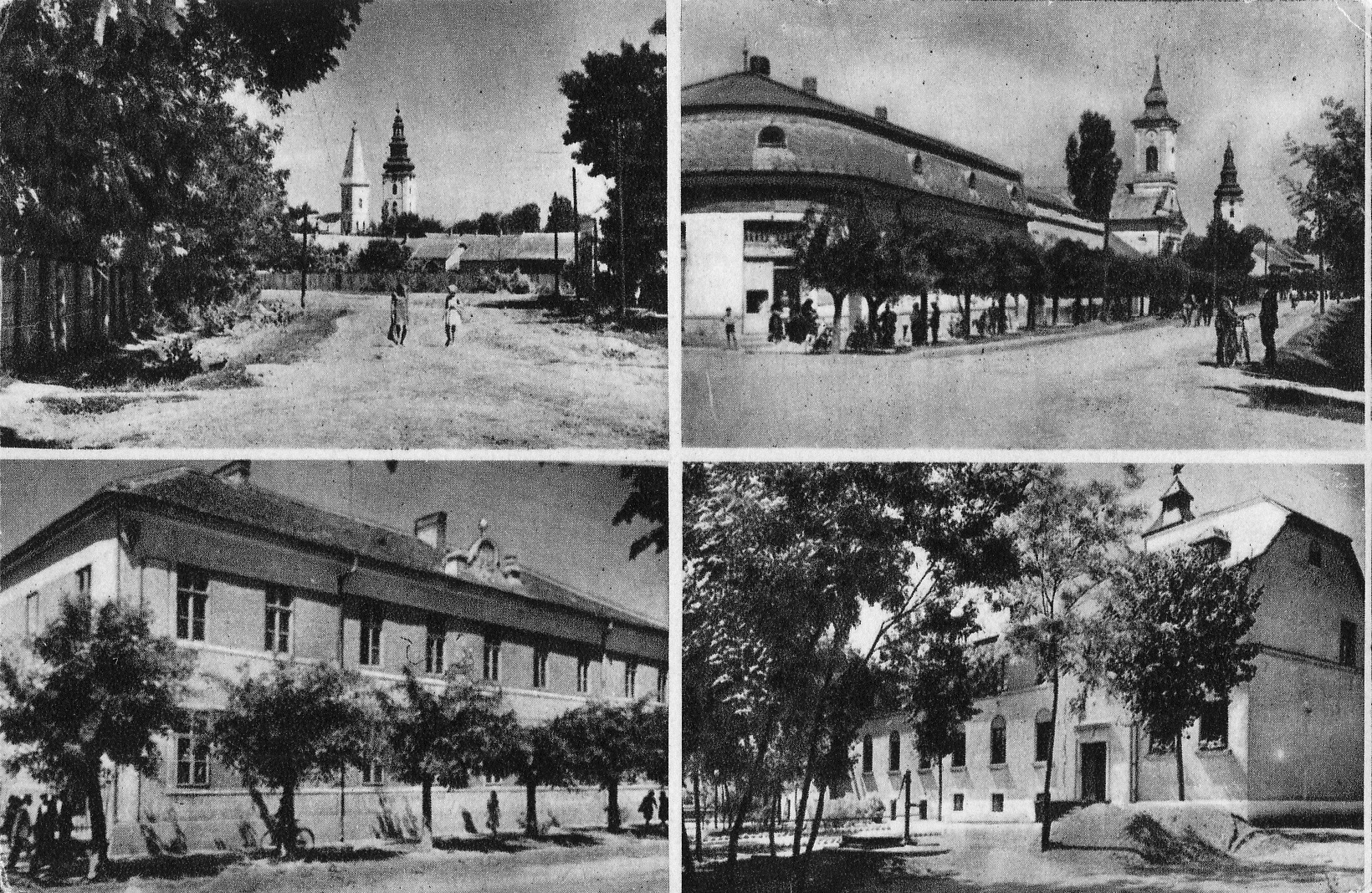
1957 Hajdudorog postcard

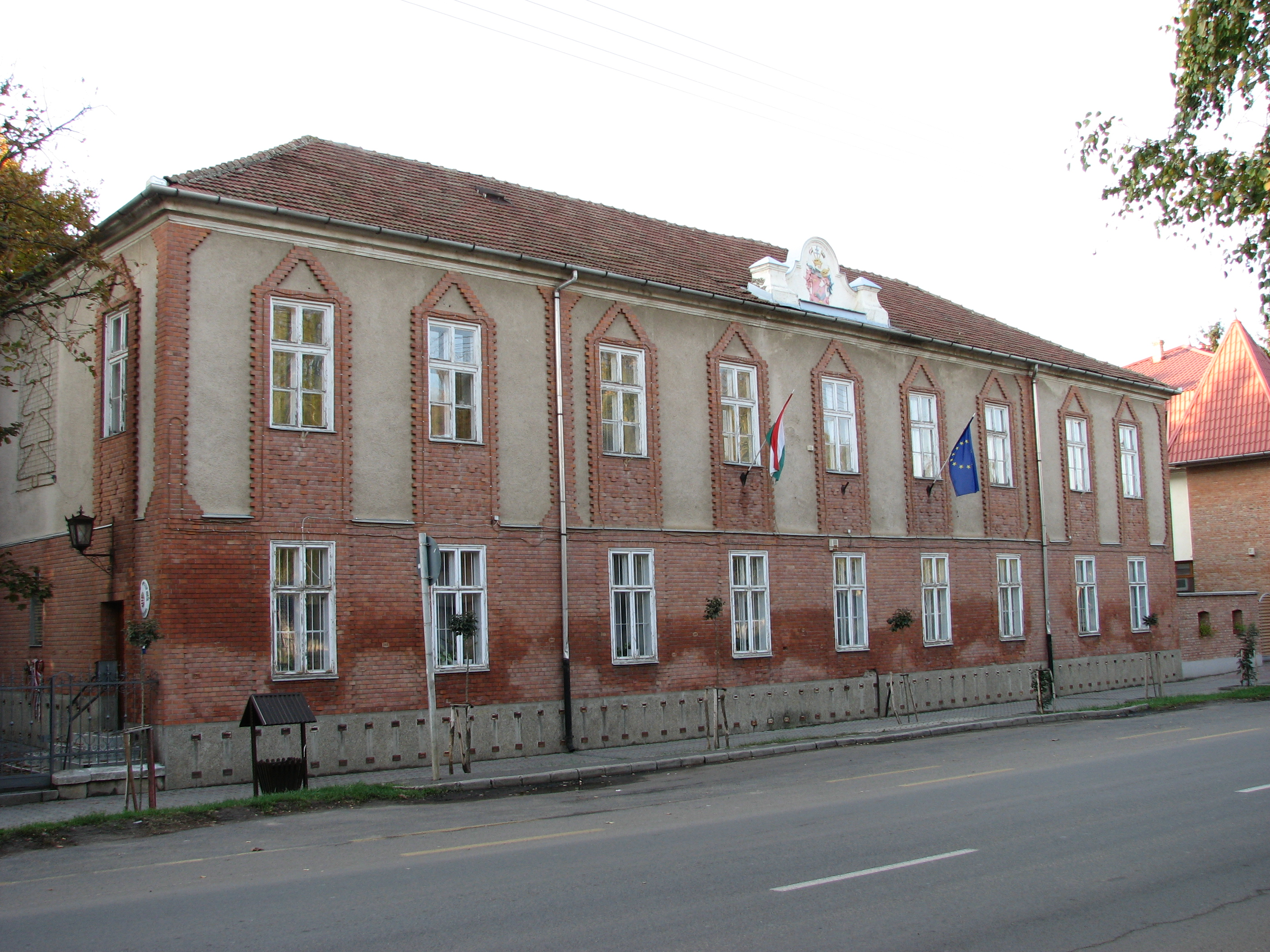
Town Hall

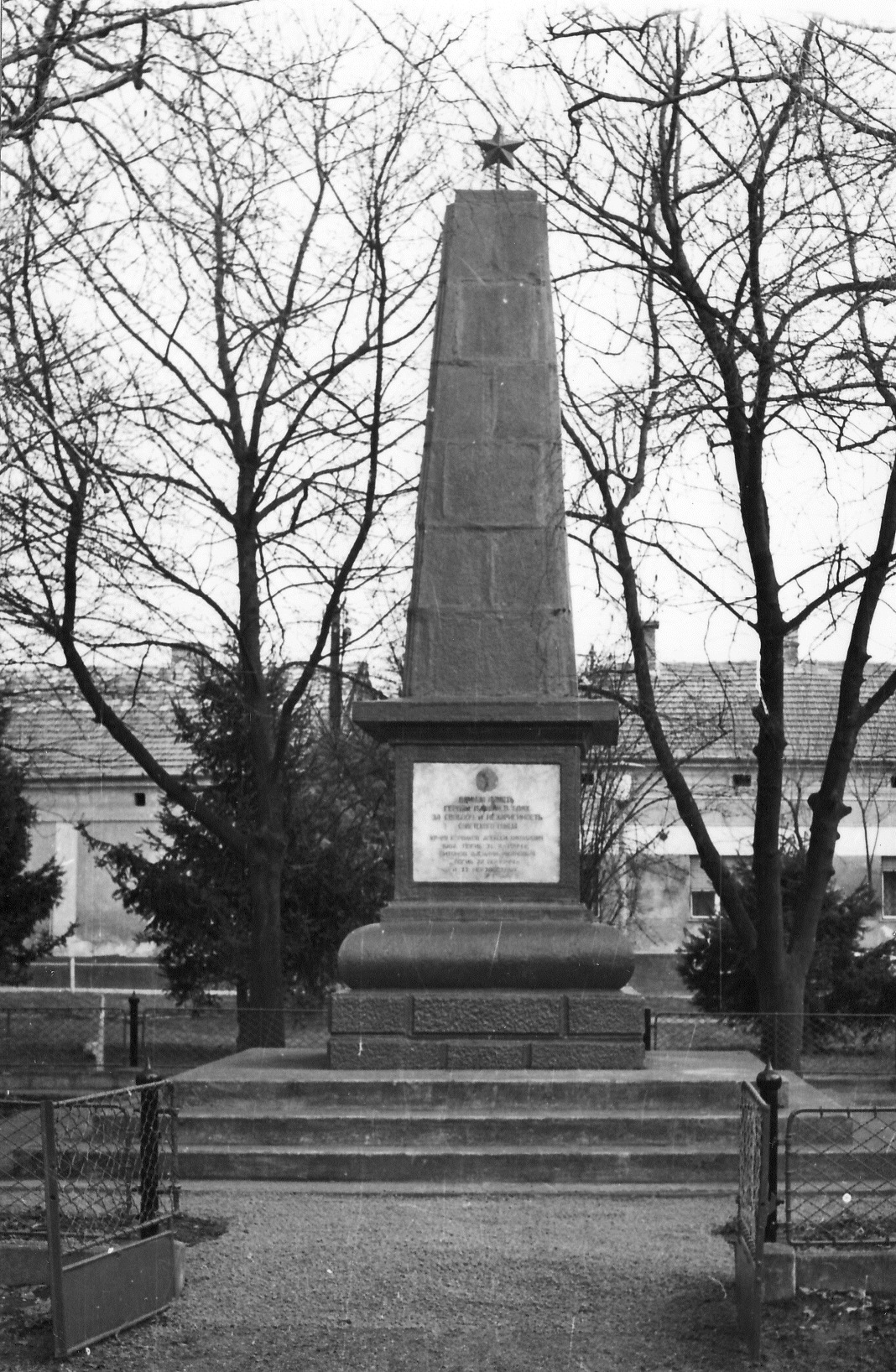
Soviet War Monument (now gone)

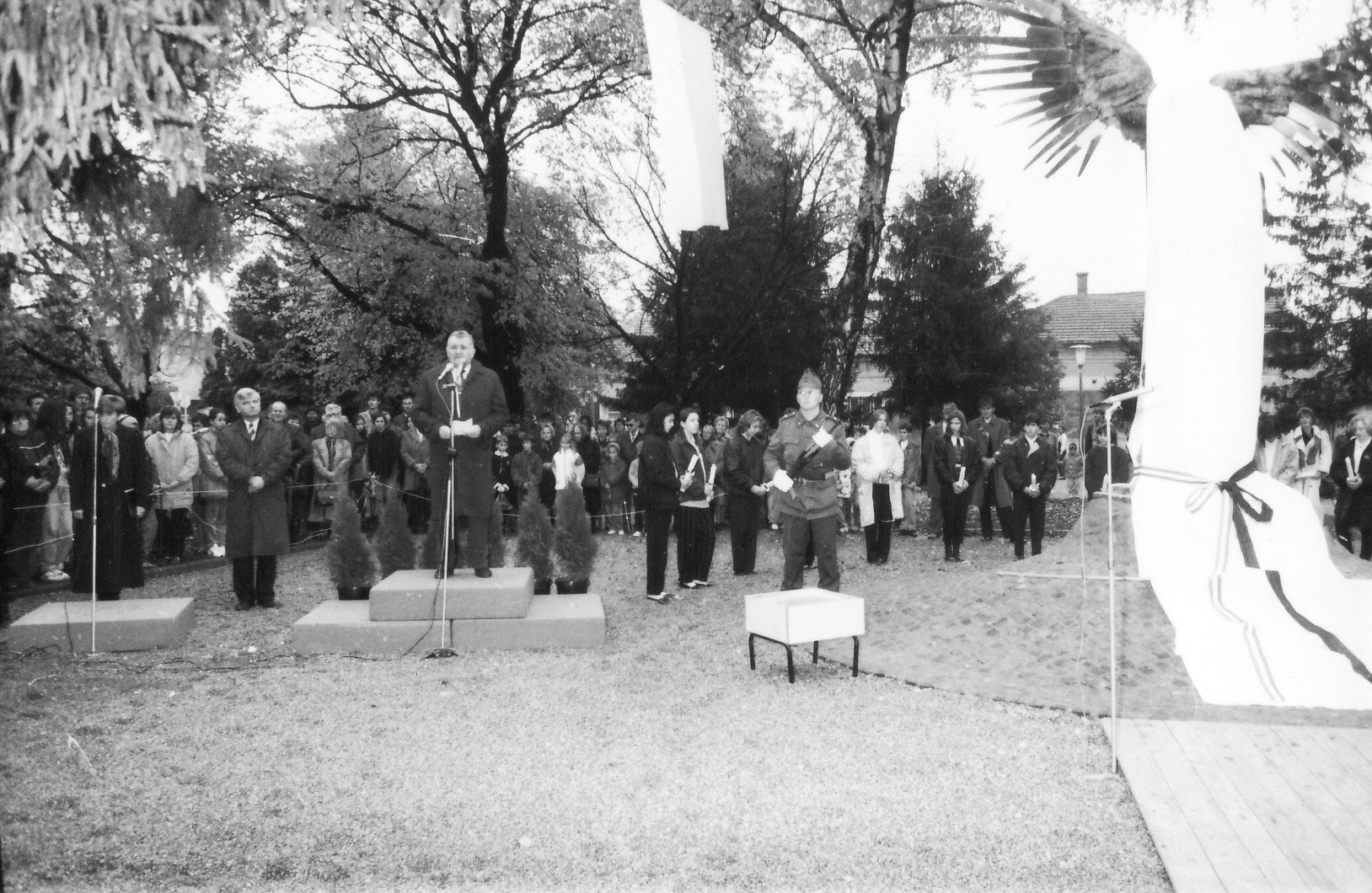
War memorial dedication, 1992

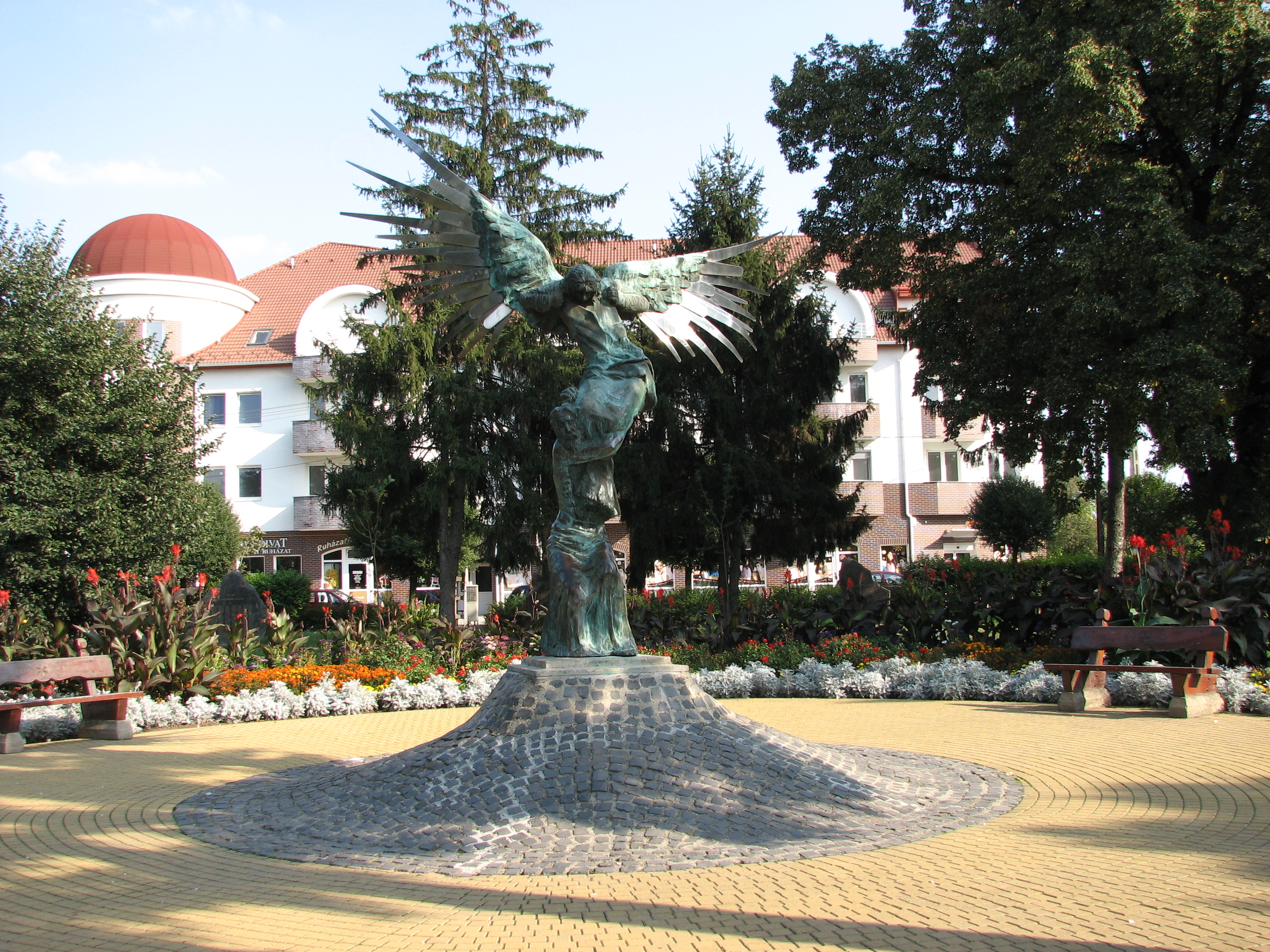
Main Square

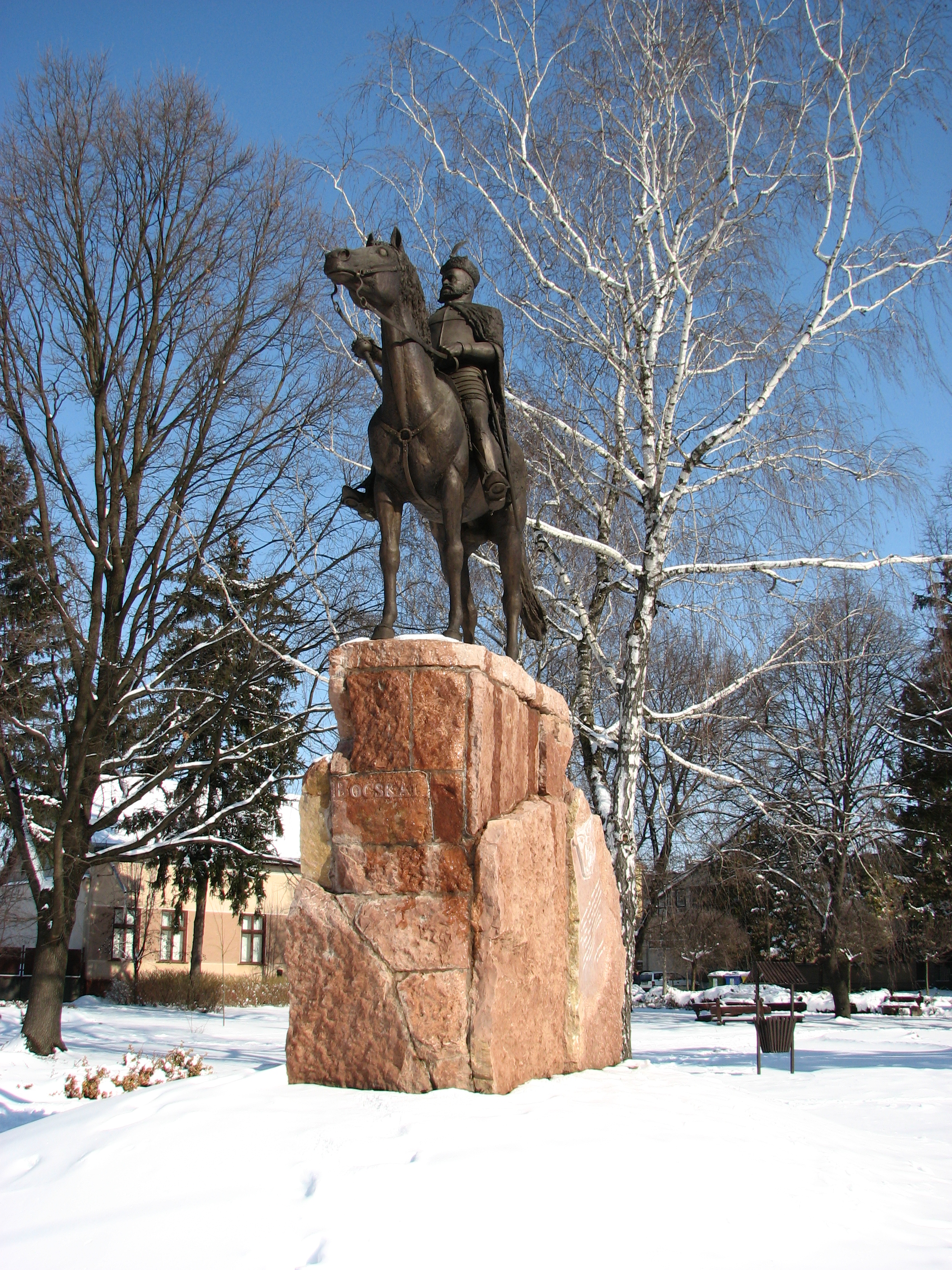
The sculpture of István Bocskai

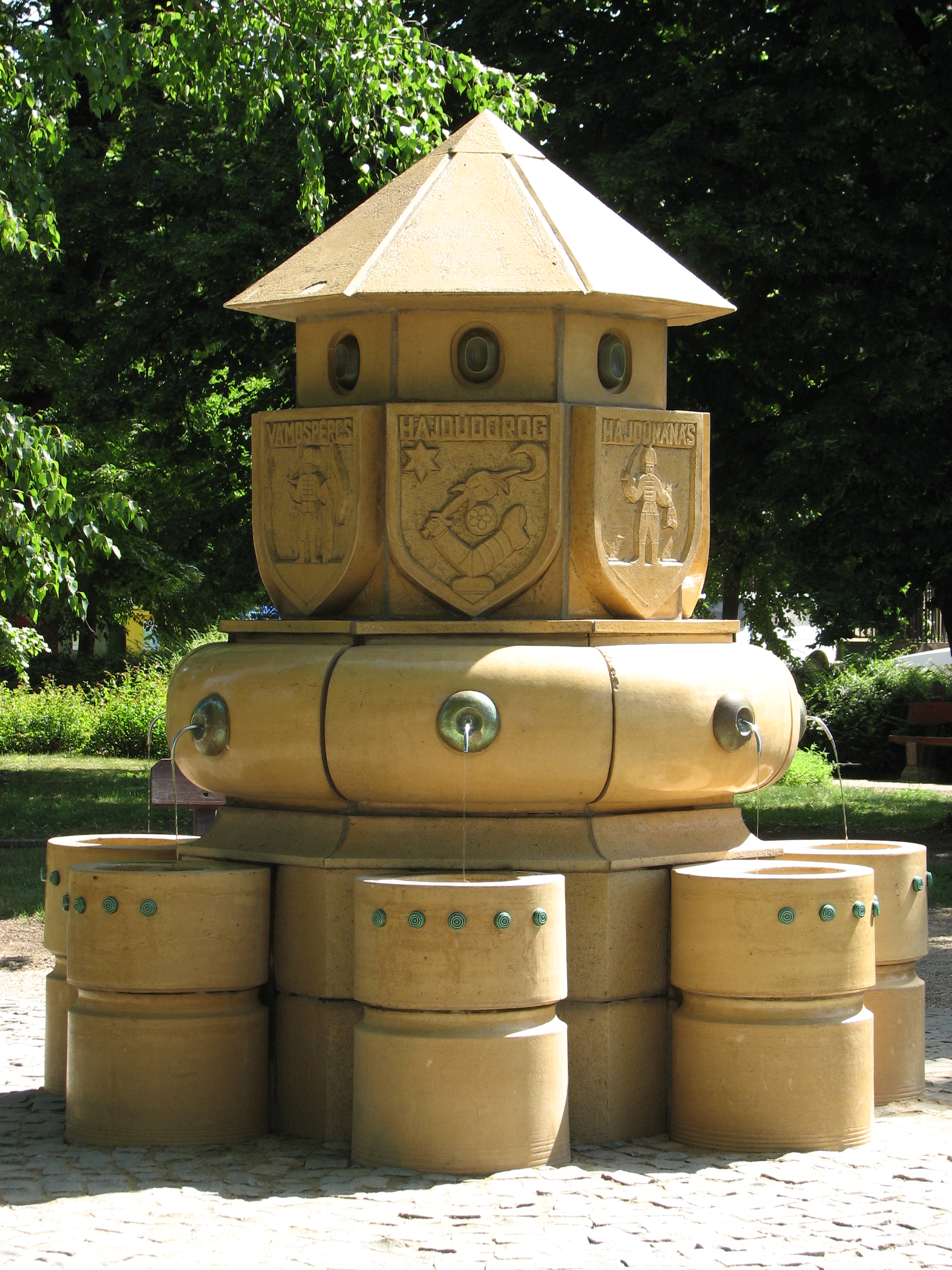
The town well

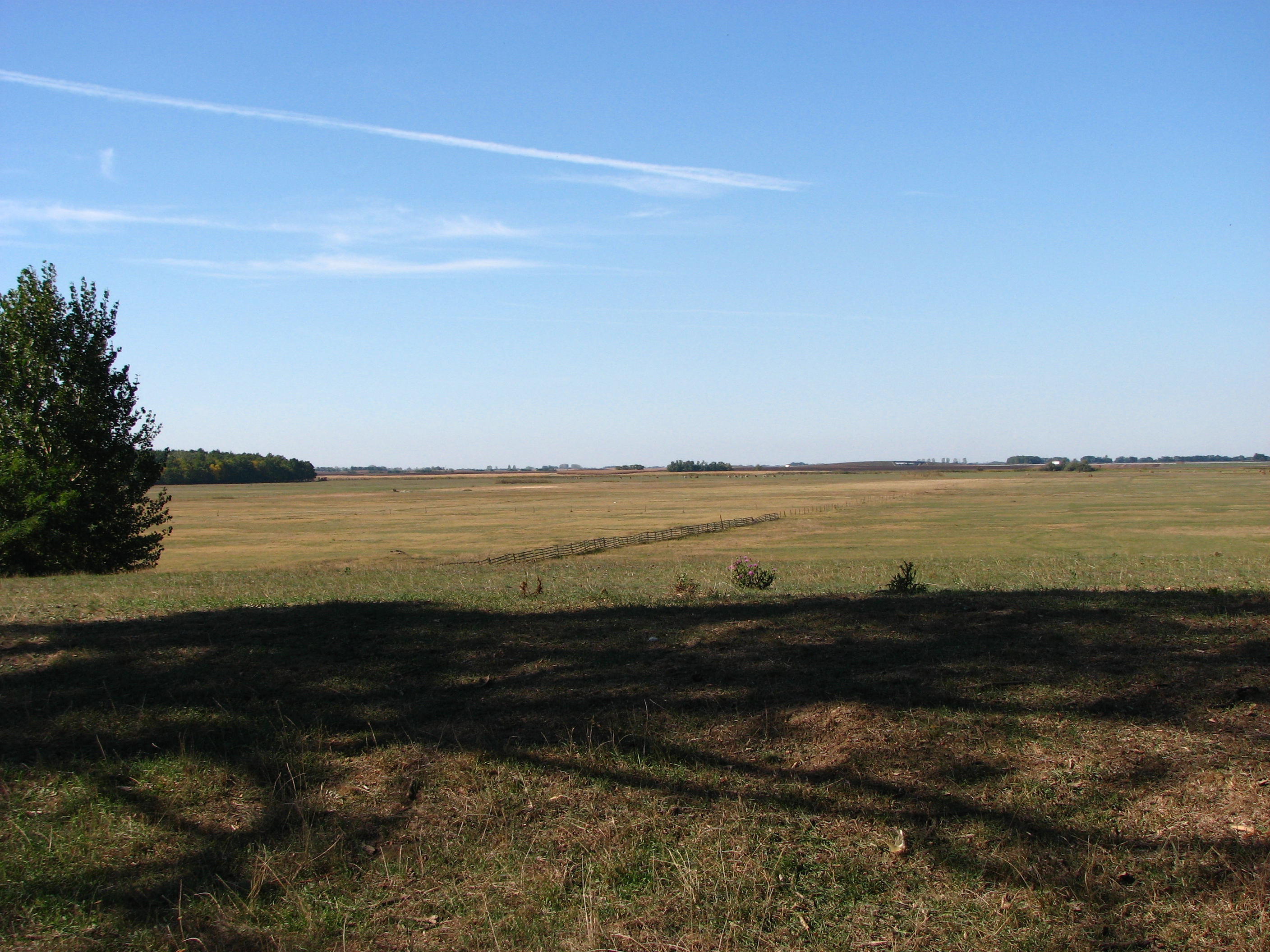
Great Plain at hajudorog

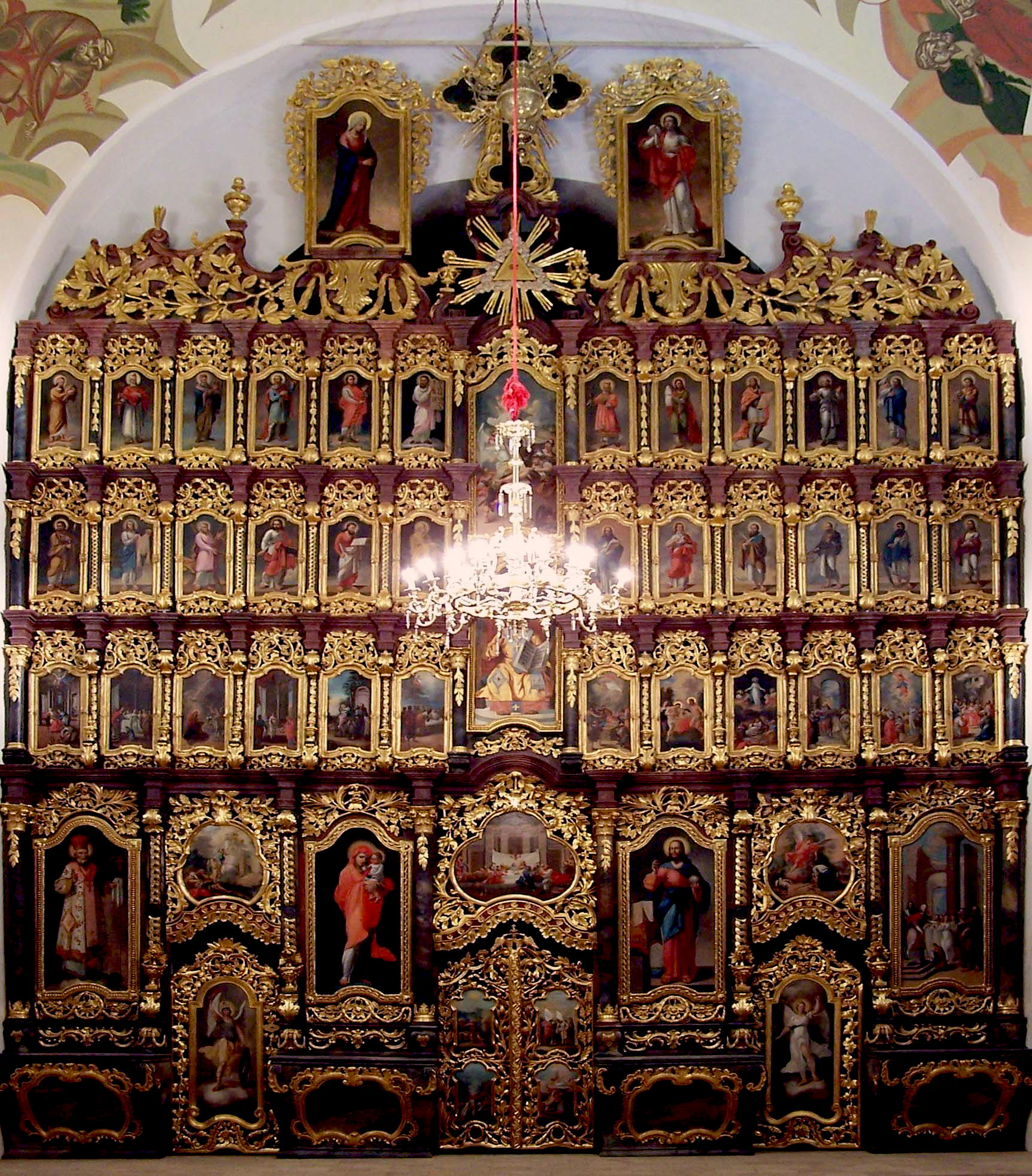
The iconostasis of the cathedral

== Twin towns – sister cities ==
Hajdúdorog is twinned with:

- Lubartów, Poland
- Miercurea Nirajului, Romania
- Odorheiu Secuiesc, Romania
- Ștei, Romania
