= Turk (surname) =

Turk is a surname. Notable people with the surname include:

== Turk ==
- Alexander Turk (1906–1988), Canadian politician
- Christopher Turk, fictional character in the TV series Scrubs
- Dan Turk (1962–2000), American football player
- Elizabeth Turk (born 1961), American artist
- Frank Turk (1817/1818–1887), American jurist & entrepreneur
- Frank Turk (biologist) (1911–1996), English entomologist and adult educationalist
- Gavin Turk (born 1967), British artist
- Godwin Turk (born 1950), American football player
- Grace Turk (born 1999), American softball player
- Greg Turk (born 1961), American-born computer scientist & academic
- Gordon Turk, American musician
- Hanan Turk (born 1971), Egyptian actress & dancer
- James Clinton Turk (1923–2014), American jurist
- Matt Turk (born 1968), American football player
- Matt Turk (musician), American singer/songwriter, multi-instrumentalist and veteran performer
- Michael Turk (born 1998), American football player
- M. K. Turk (1942–2013), American basketball coach
- Neil Turk (born 1983), English cricketer
- Rifaat Turk (born 1954), Israeli Team Israel Olympic footballer, Deputy Mayor of Tel Aviv
- Roy Turk (1892–1934), American songwriter
- Rudy Turk (1927–2007), American museum director, curator, painter
- Samuel Turk (1917–2009), American religious leader
- Stella Turk (1925–2017), British zoologist, naturalist, and conservationist
- Tommy Turk (1927–1981), American musician
- Warda al Turk (1797–1873), Lebanese poet
- William Turk (1866–1911), American musician
- Željko Turk (born 1962), Croatian politician

== Türk ==
- Ahmet Türk (born 1942), Kurdish politician
- Alex Türk (born 1950), French politician
- Barbara Miklič Türk (born 1948), Slovenian politician and former First Lady
- Berta Türk (1888–1960), Austrian-born Hungarian actress
- Daniel Gottlob Türk (1756–1813), German musician
- Danilo Türk (born 1952), Slovenian politician
- Dilara Türk (born 1996), Turkish-German women's footballer
- Gerd Türk, German singer
- Hasan Türk (born 1993), Turkish footballer
- Hikmet Sami Türk (born 1935), Turkish academic and politician
- Roman Türk (born 1945), Austrian lichenologist
- Sümeyra Türk (born 1997), Turkish para table tennis player
- Volker Türk (born 1965), Austrian lawyer and United Nations official

== See also ==
- al-Turk
- Mustafa Kemal Atatürk
- Tuerk
- Özgentürk
