= Bezeréd =

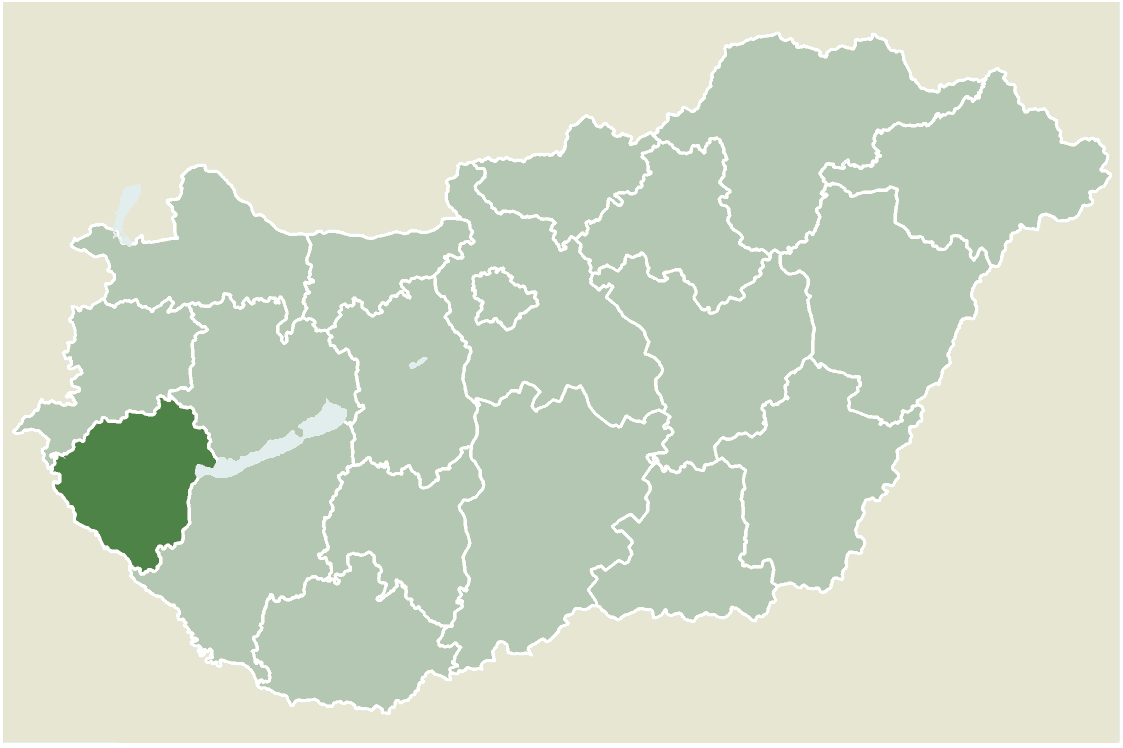
- Location of Zala county in Hungary

- Location of Bezeréd
- Coordinates: 46.86913°N 17.01308°E
- Country: Hungary
- County: Zala

Area
  - Total: 18.5 km^{2} (7.1 sq mi)

Population (2001)
  - Total: 201
  - Density: 16.56/km^{2} (42.9/sq mi)
- Time zone: UTC+1 (CET)
  - Summer (DST): UTC+2 (CEST)
- Postal code: 8934
- Area code: 92

Bezeréd is a village in Zala County in the south-western region of Hungary.

== Etymology ==
The name comes from a Slavic personal name Bezradъ (bez: without, radъ: to be happy/happiness). 1236 casterenses de Bezered, 1359 the settlement Bezered.
