= Vojlovica =

Vojlovica can refer to:

- Vojlovica Monastery, a monastery in Banat, Vojvodina, Serbia
- Vojlovica, Pančevo, a quarter of the Pančevo city, Serbia
- Vojlovica, Croatia, a village near Čačinci
