= Lighthouses at the confluence of the Tamiš and the Danube =

Lighthouses in Serbia

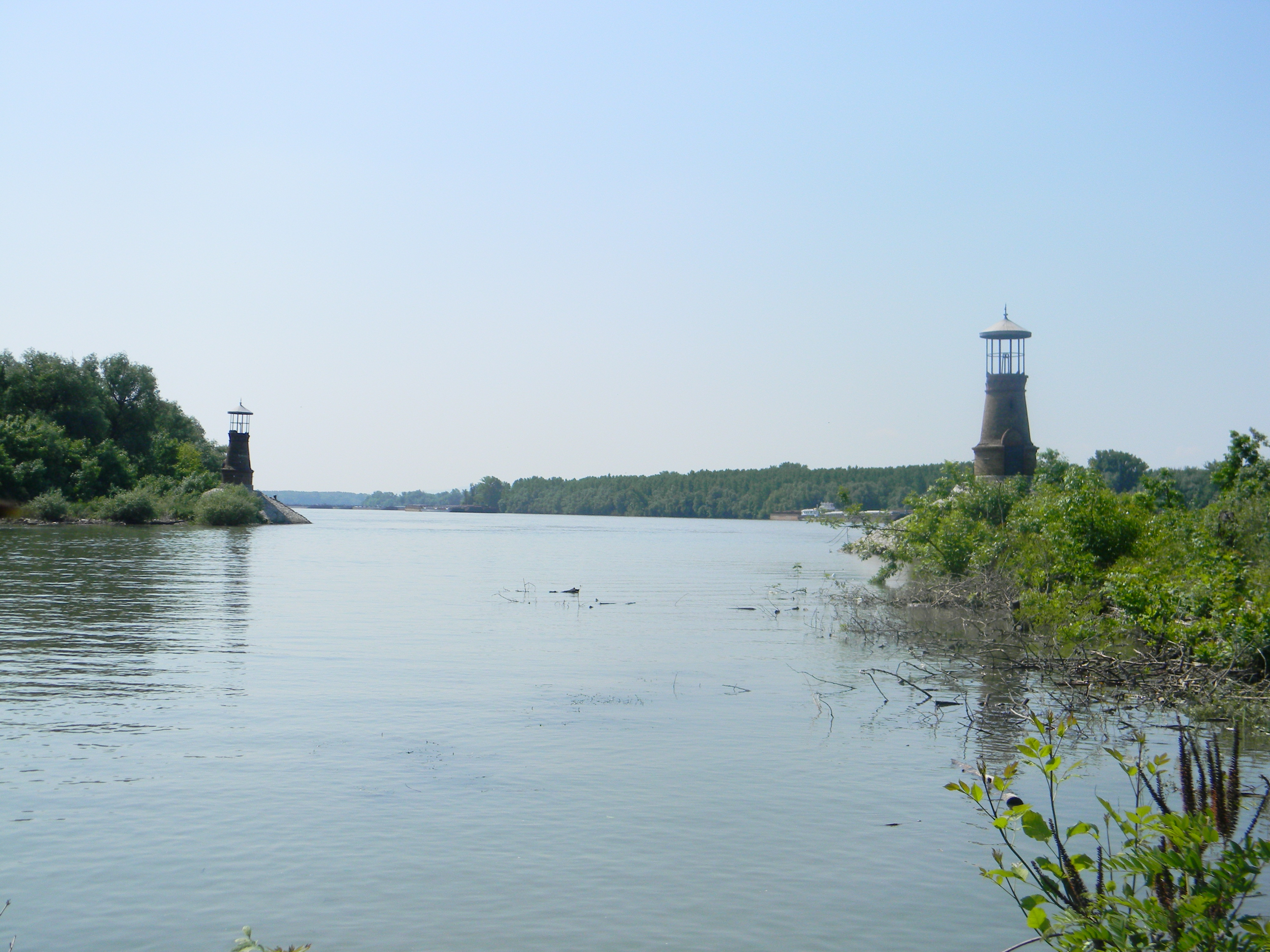
- The lighthouses on the river Tamiš in Pančevo

- Location within Serbia Location within Europe

General information
- Type: Lighthouse
- Location: Serbia
- Coordinates: 44°50′54.95″N 20°38′6.25″E
- Construction started: 1909

The lighthouses at the confluence of the Tamiš and Danube rivers near the city of Pančevo were built in 1909 during the Austro-Hungarian Empire. At one time, they were also popularly known as the "Water Gate of the City". They represent immovable cultural property as cultural monuments of great importance.

== Architecture ==
The lighthouse towers are built of yellow bricks placed on a circular base of earth, bordered and lined with stone. The lighthouses are built in three zones that are divided horizontally by a decorative wreath of red, profiled bricks that frames the entrance door and window panes. At the top of the lighthouse tower is a terrace covered with a conical roof and light source supports. The lighthouse lamp worked on kerosene.

== History ==
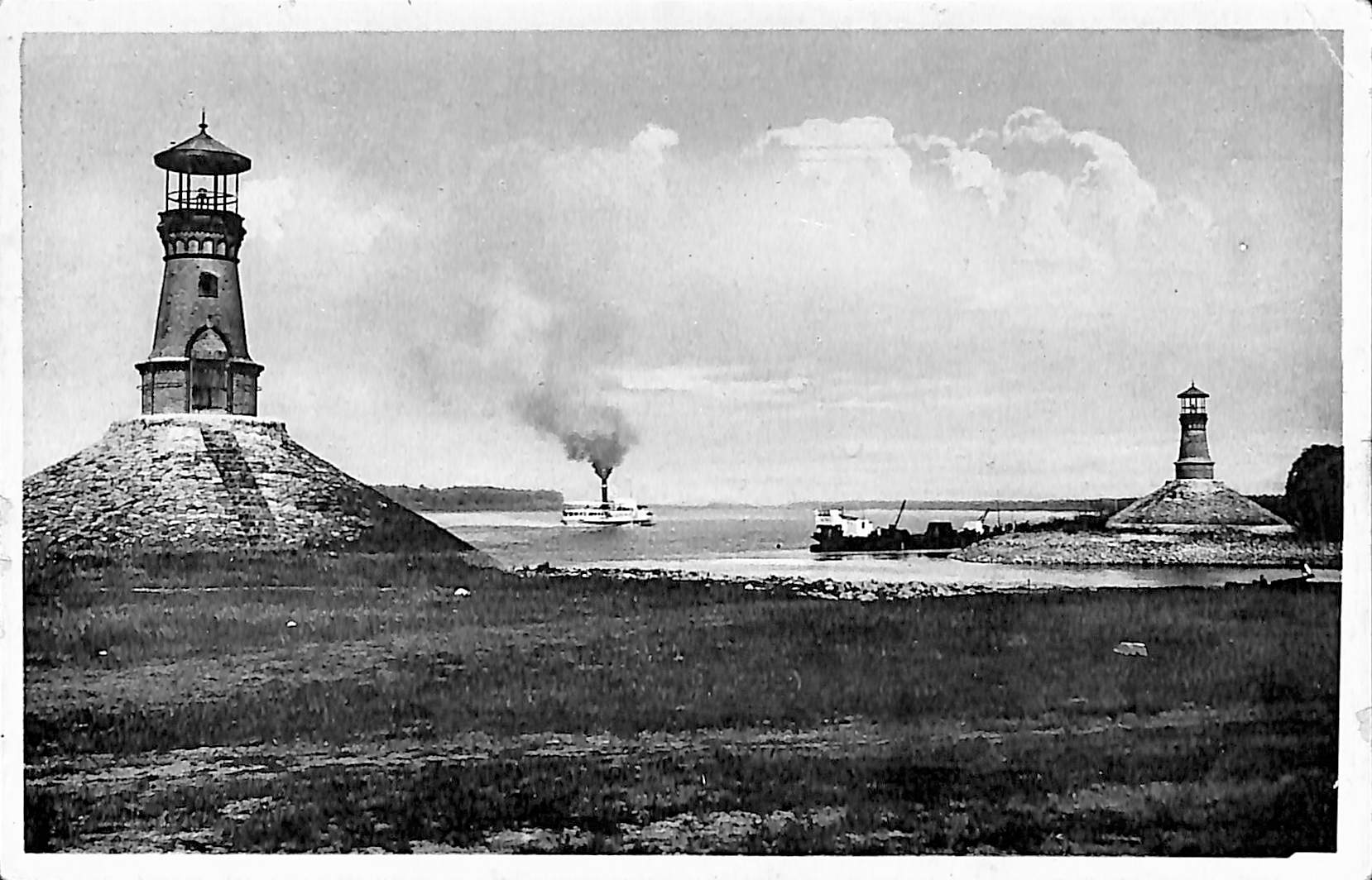
Early 1900s

At the time of the construction of the Tamis lighthouses in 1909, Pančevo, as a border free royal city, was a major industrial center of the time. Pančevo at that time already had a brewery, the newly opened "Svilara", "Crveni magacin" and developed trade, salt, silk, beer, bricks, timber and people were transported along the Tamis and Danube rivers. The Pančevo-Zrenjanin railway was opened in 1894 and the section on the Pančevo-Vladimirovac route in 1896, thus strengthening land trade routes. Pančevo became an important crossroads of land and river traffic. At that time, river traffic without lighthouses became unthinkable.

The problem of navigation became pronounced at the beginning of the twentieth century when it was decided to shorten the course of the Tamis by digging a canal. By cutting the Tamiš, a lot of soil was excavated, so there was no vegetation, so at night or when the water level rose, there were no landmarks on the left and right banks. Stranded ships were a common sight, since there was a lot of traffic. This led to the development of signaling, marking the banks and building lighthouses.

During the second part of the twentieth century, with the disappearance of steamboats, the closure of the port on the Tamiš near Pančevo and the relocation of the old Pancevo industrial zone, the lighthouses gradually began to lose their function and maintenance ceased. The Danube and the Tamiš eroded the foundations, and the local population carried away the stone, in addition to the stone, the metal stairs were also taken from the lighthouse, and the lighthouse lamp disappeared. Such carelessness led to the fact that the lighthouses were in danger of collapse several times.

== Repair and maintenance ==
The two lighthouses have not been in operation since the 1960s. They fell into disrepair until 2000, when the city's Institute for the Protection of Monuments and the Municipality of Pančevo decided to restore and preserve them. Work was carried out to save the foundation. Access to the lighthouses from the mainland is difficult, with the land of the Port of Pančevo on one side and the land of a private owner on the other. The path is overgrown and almost impassable, so restoration and conservation have stopped.

== Gallery ==
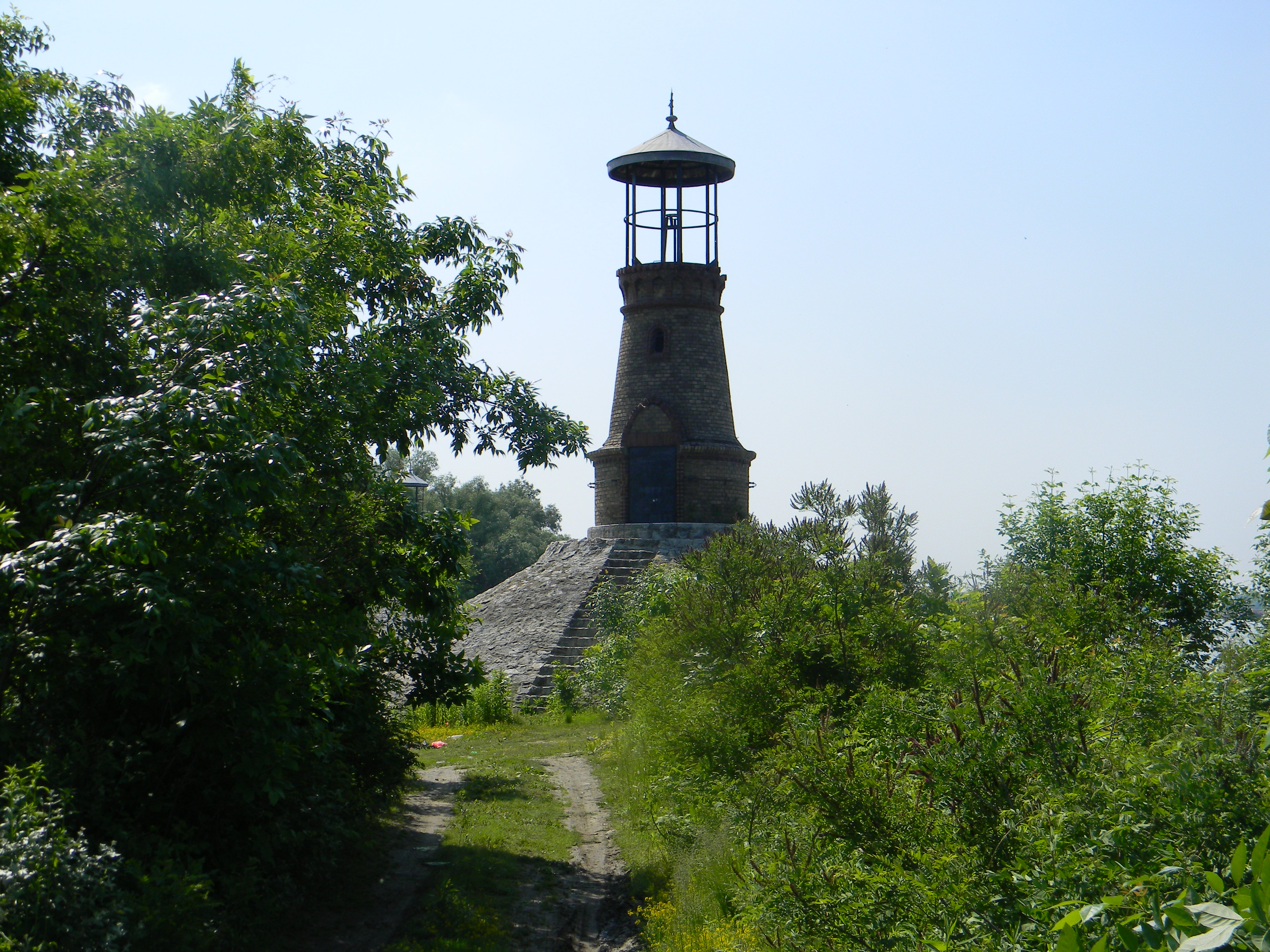

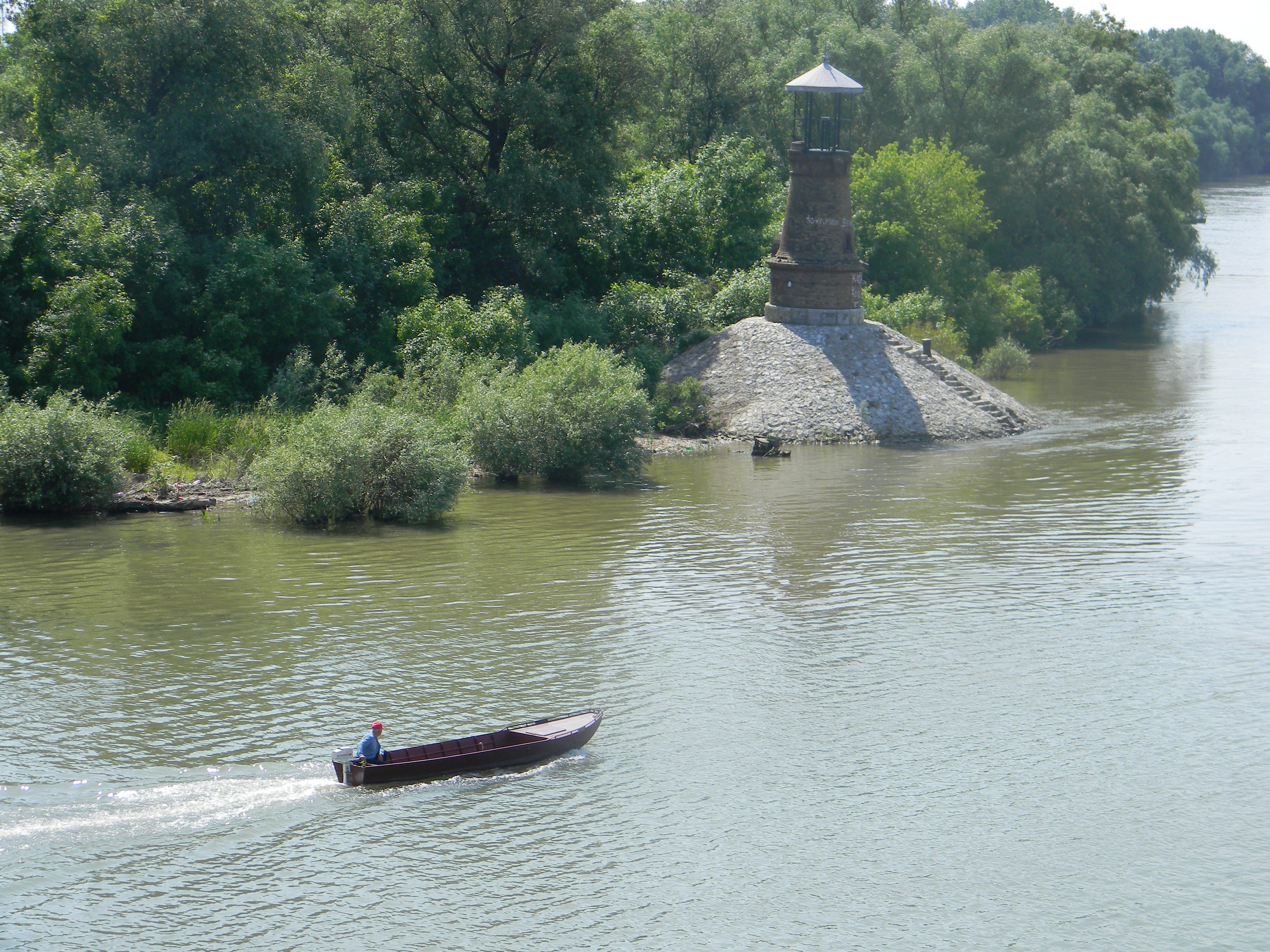

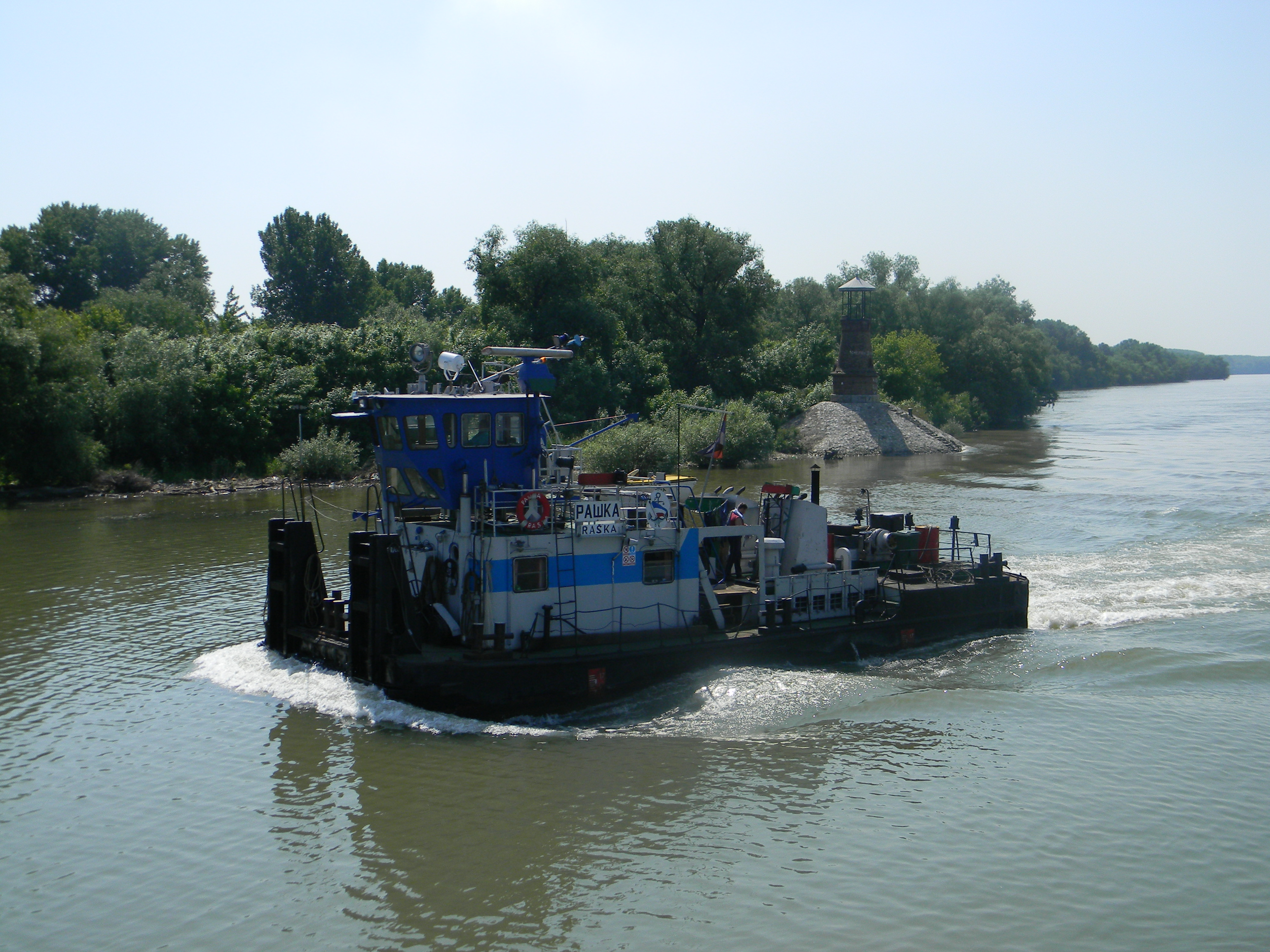

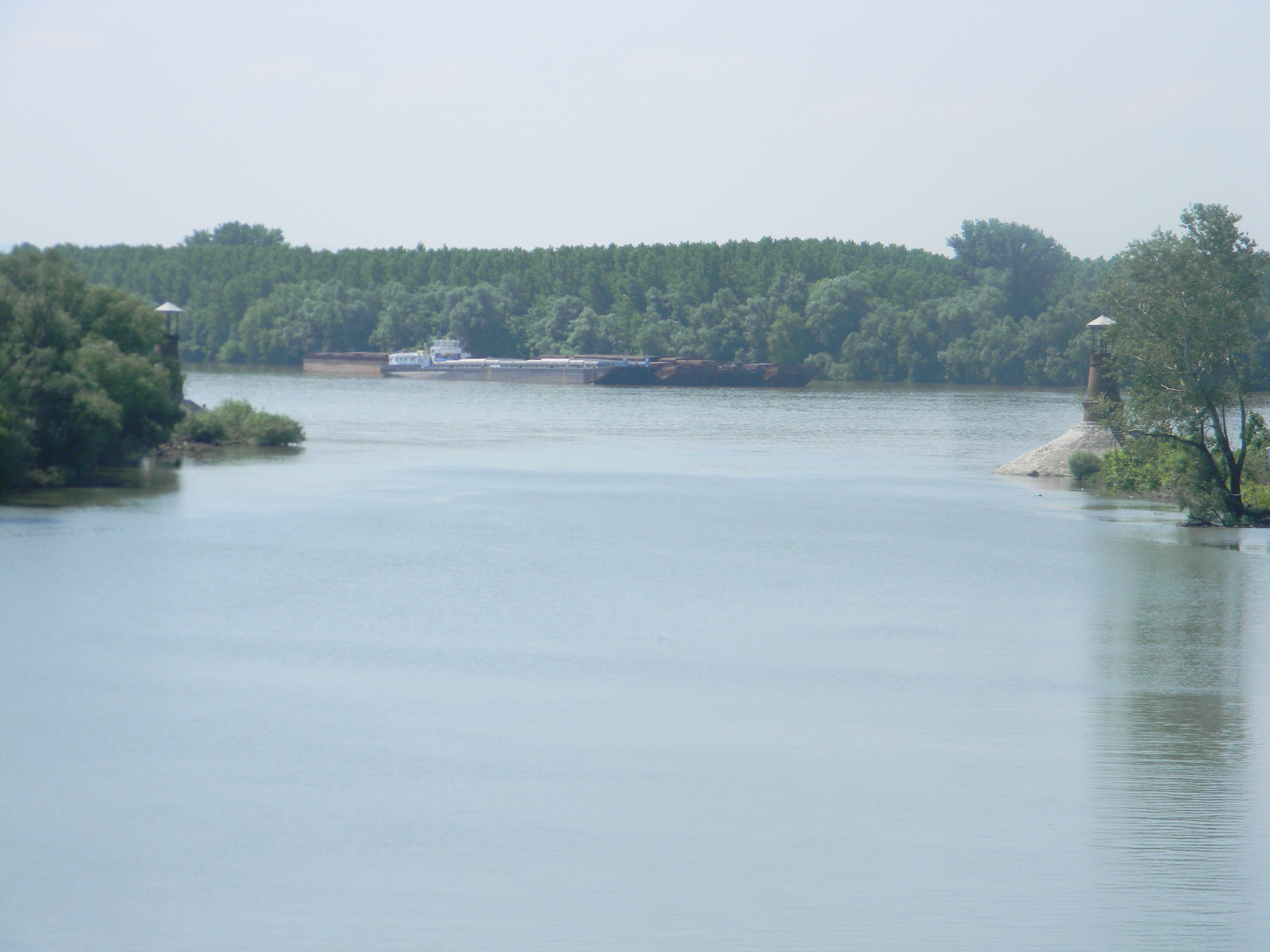

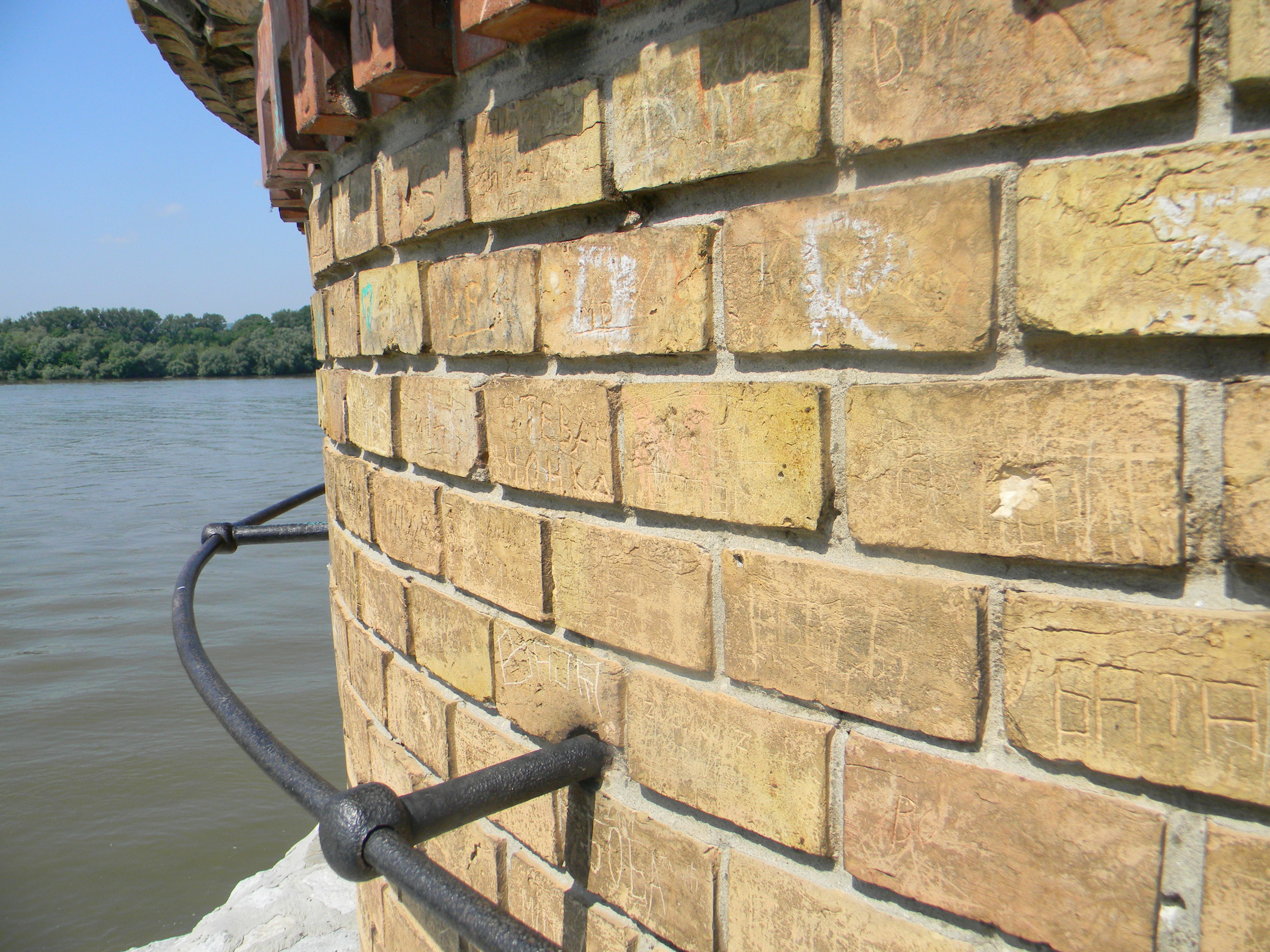

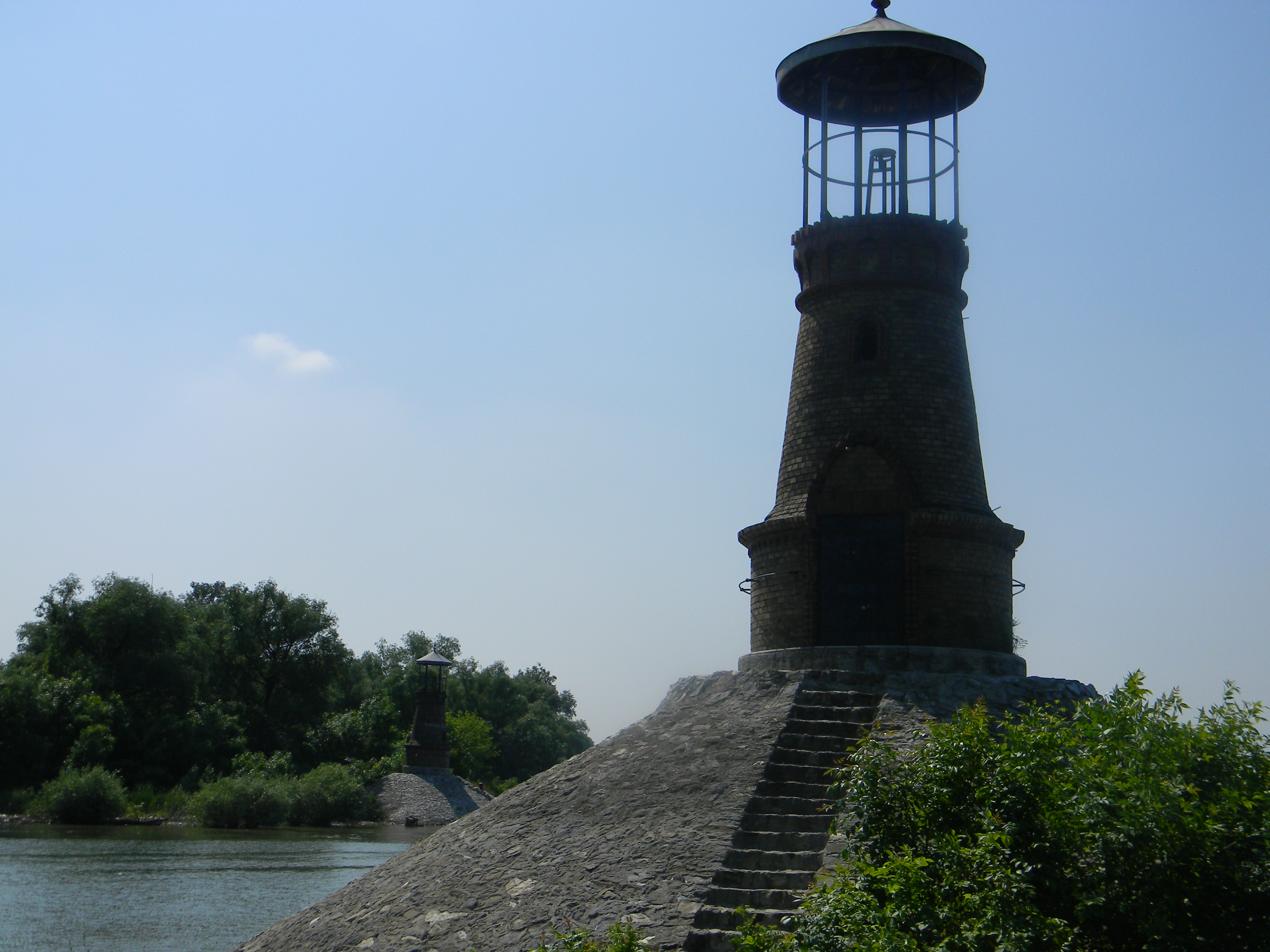
