= Pančevo =

City in the province of Vojvodina, Serbia

Pančevo Панчево (Serbian)
- City
- Град Панчево; Grad Pančevo; City of Pančevo
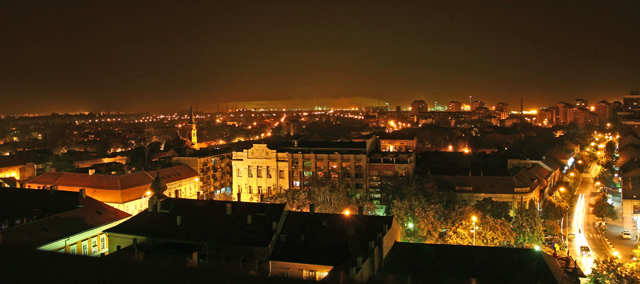
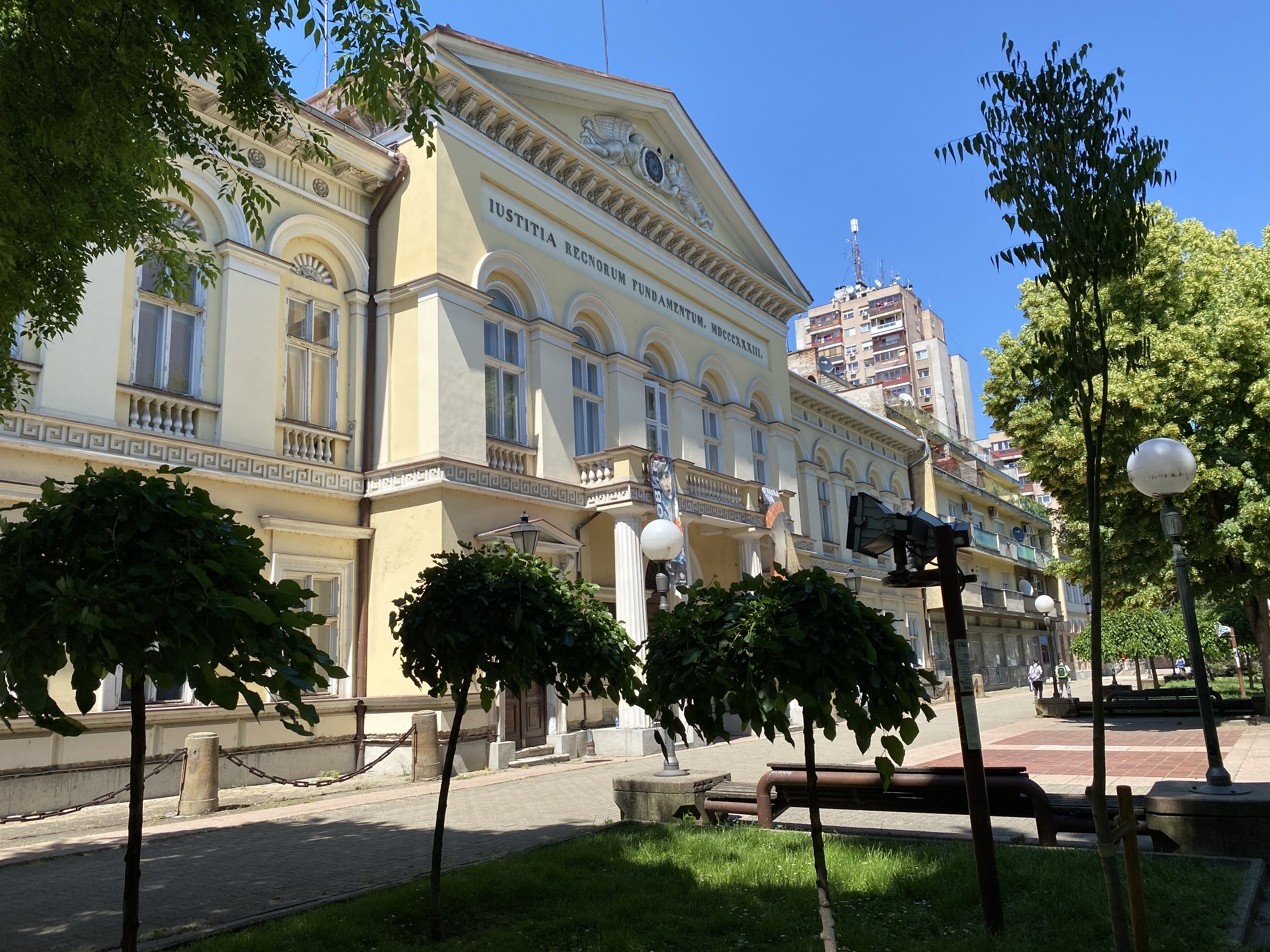
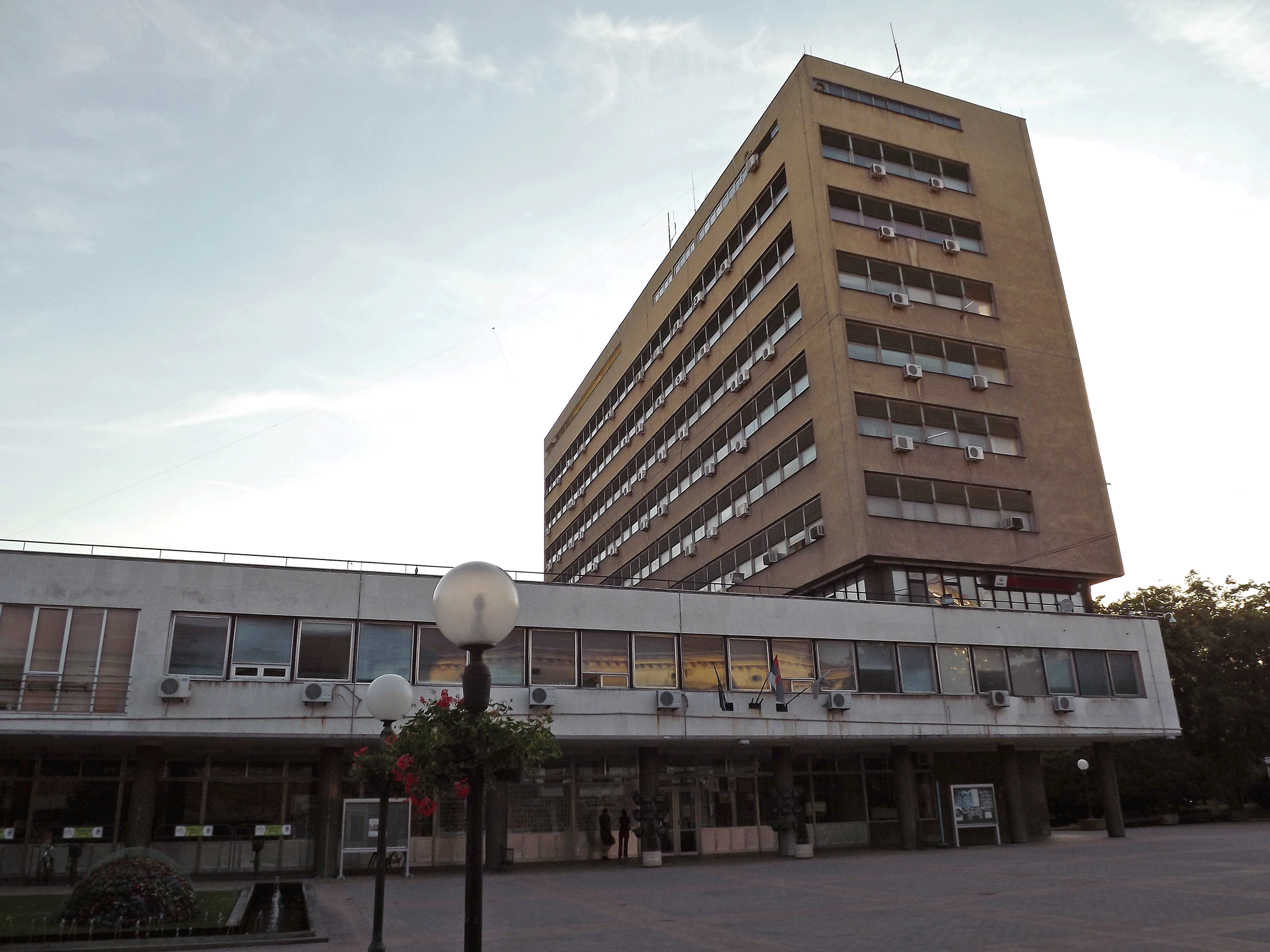
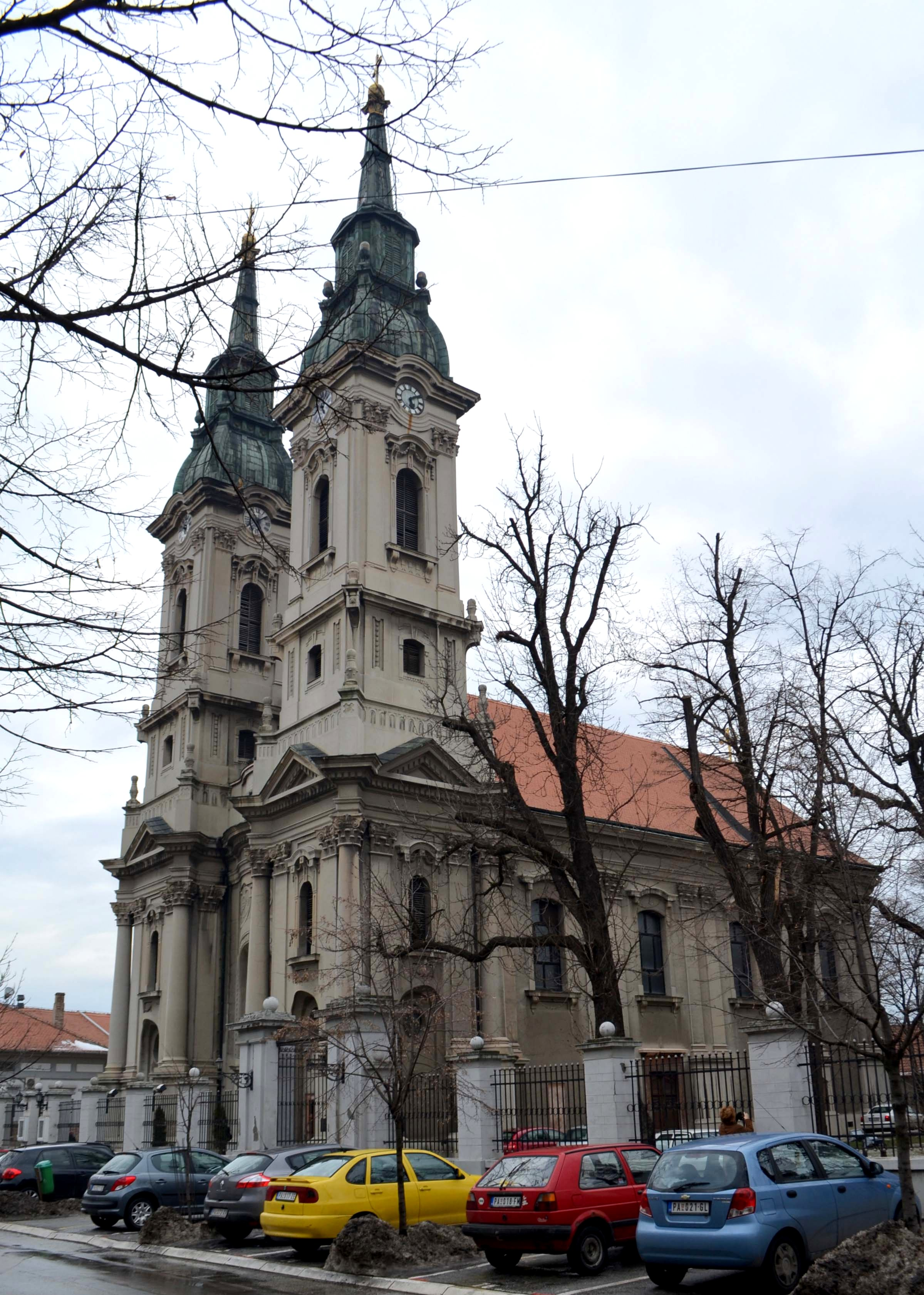
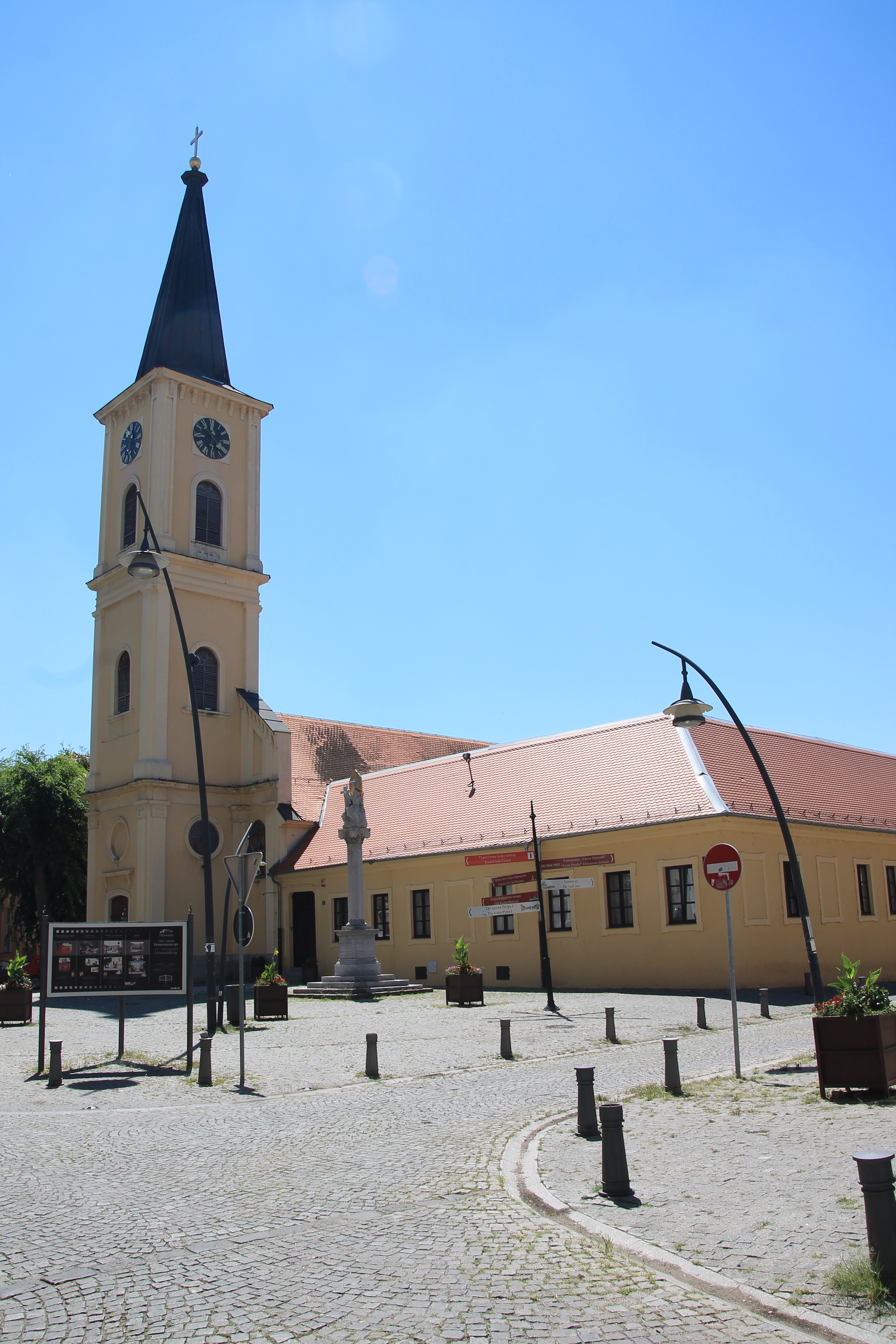
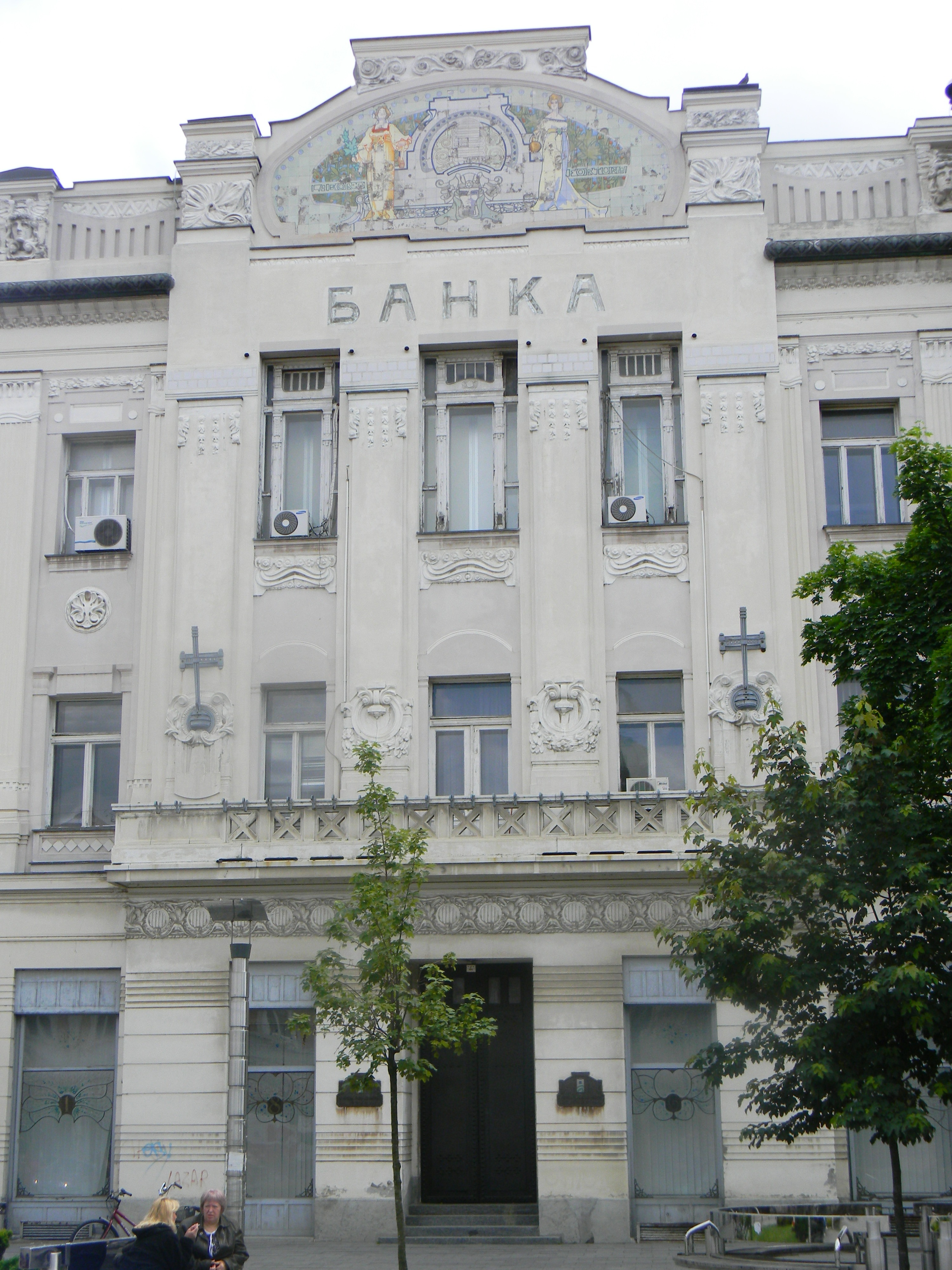
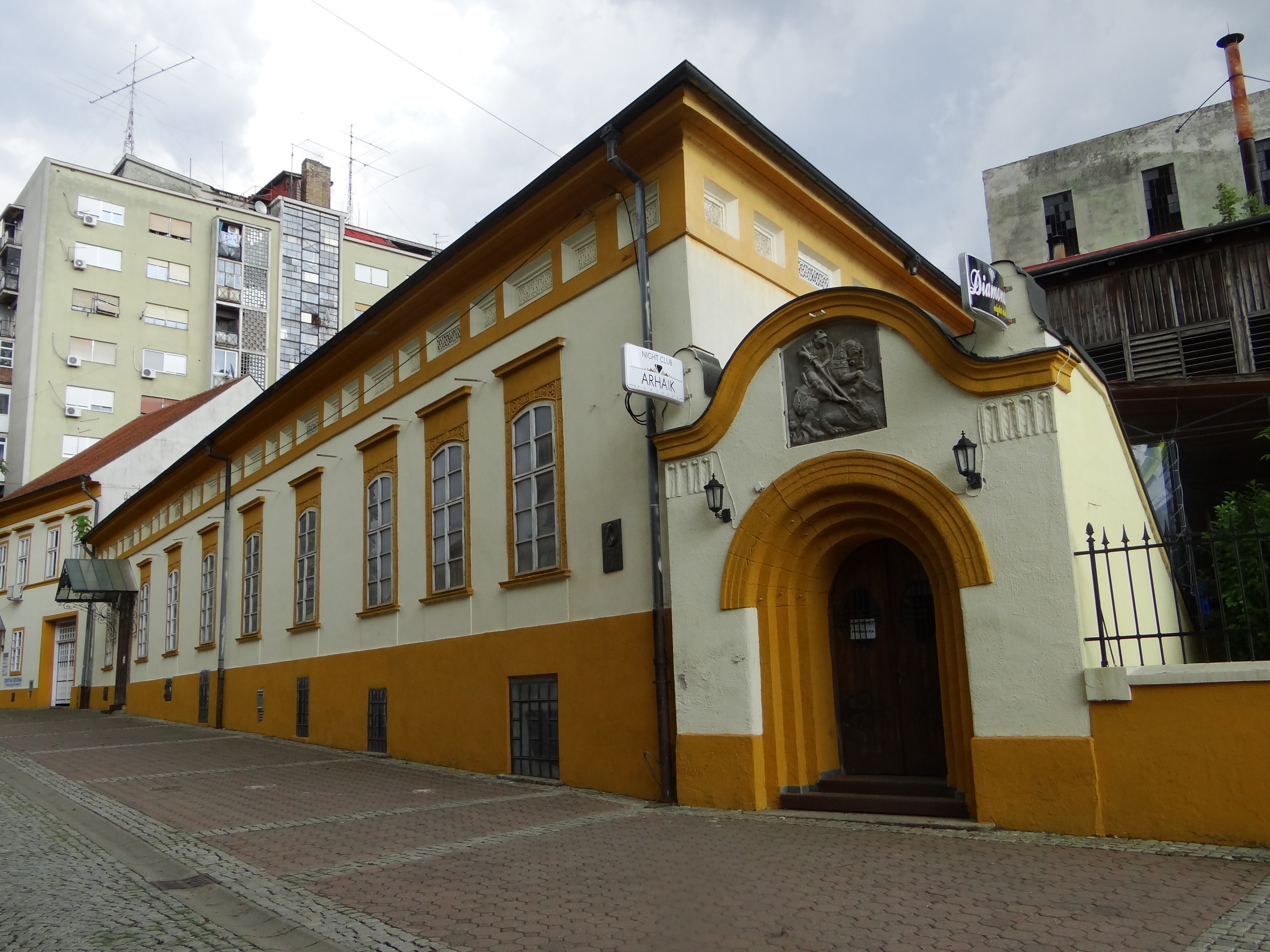
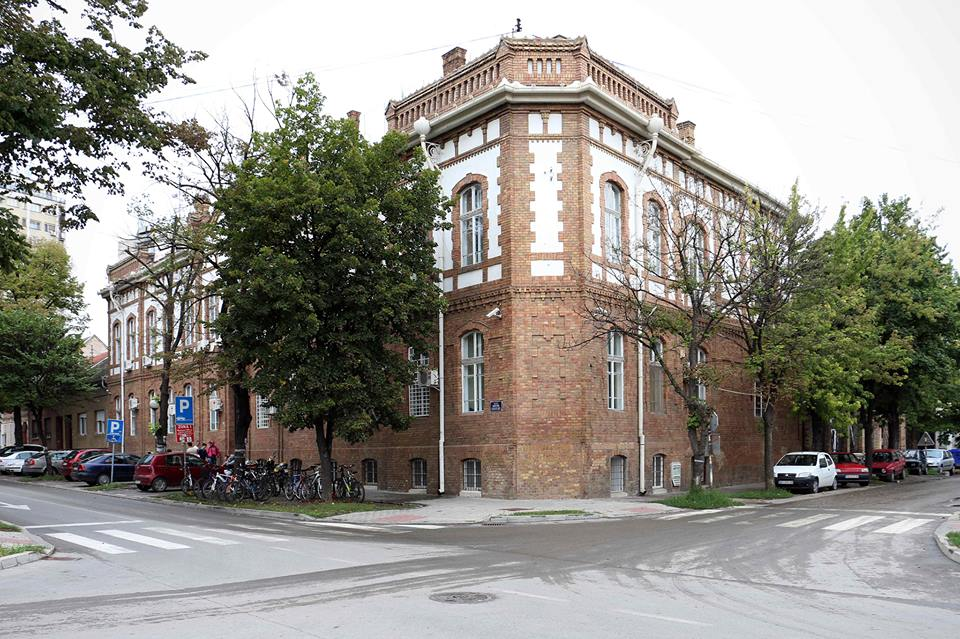
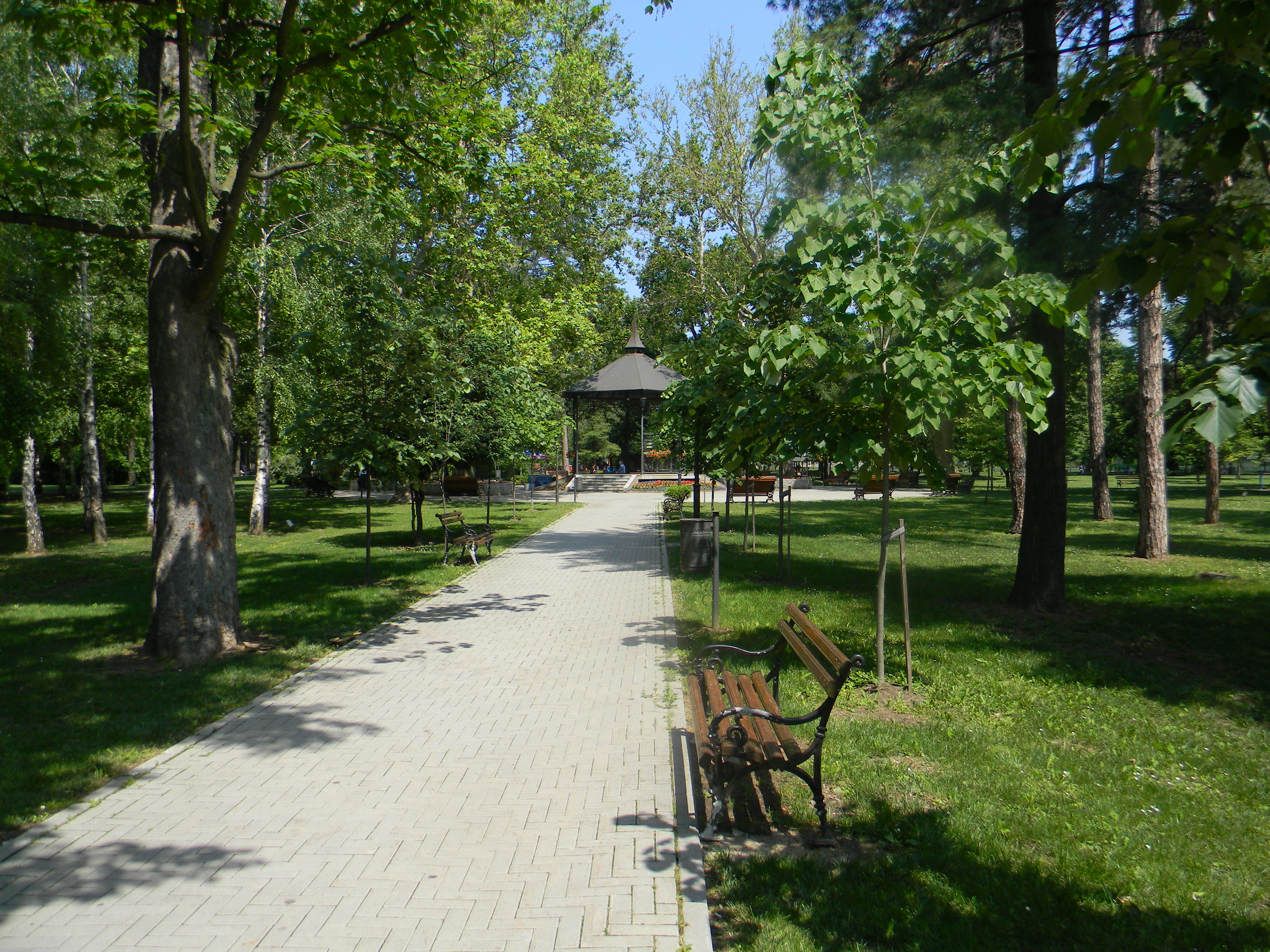
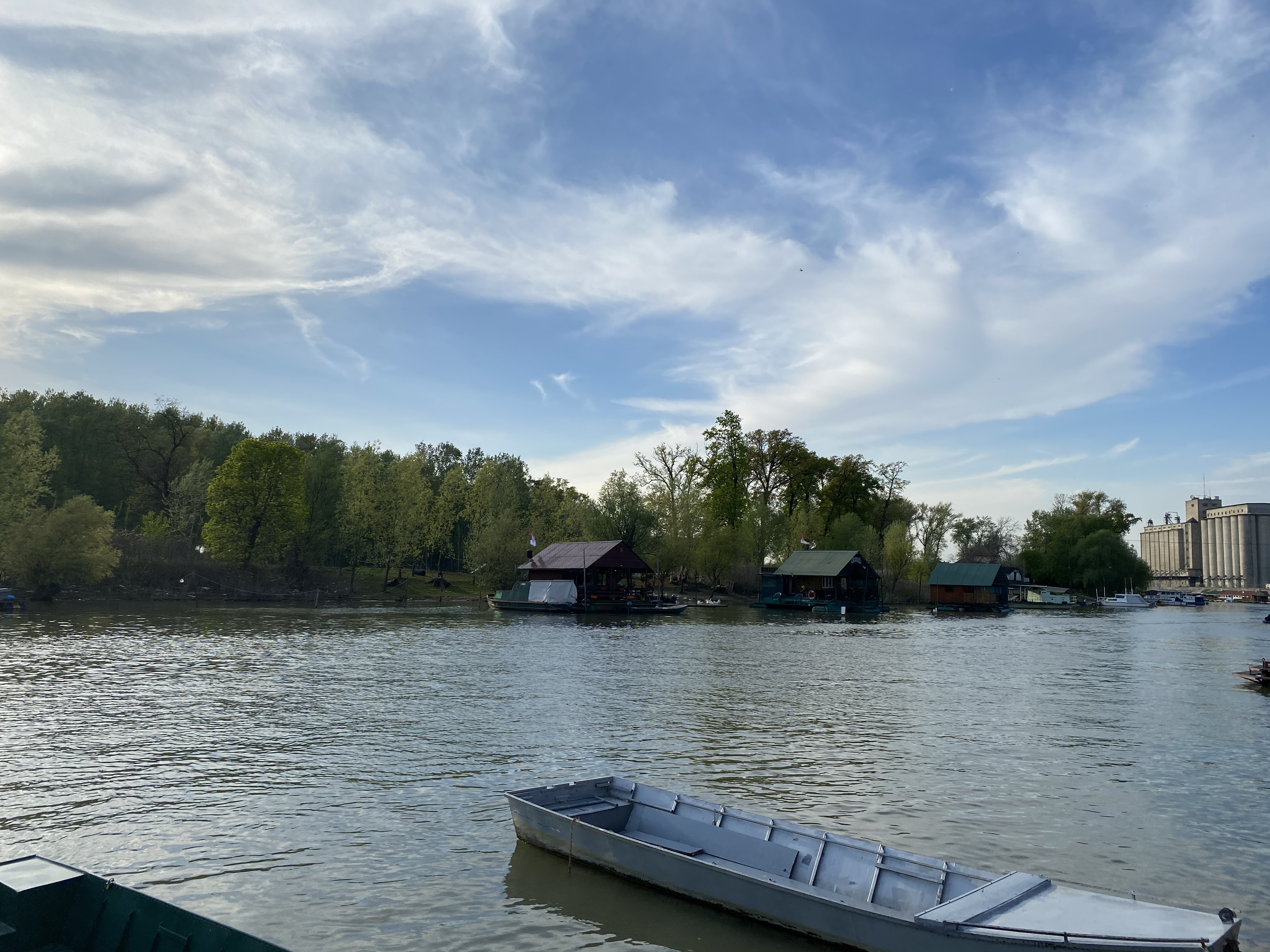
- Panorama of Pančevo at night National Museum Pančevo City Hall Church of the Assumption of the Theotokos Church of St. Charles Borromeo Pučka Bank Brewery Museum High School "Nikola Tesla" National Garden River Tamiš

- Flag Coat of arms

- Location within Serbia Location within Europe
- Coordinates: 44°52′14″N 20°38′25″E
- Country: Serbia
- Province: Vojvodina
- District: South Banat
- First mention: 1153
- City status: 1873

Government
  - Mayor: Aleksandar Stevanović (SNS)
  - Deputy Mayor: Dragana Kuprešanin (SNS)
  - Ruling parties: SNS, ZSG, SPS/JS

Area
  - Urban: 263.14 km^{2} (101.60 sq mi)
  - Administrative: 755.66 km^{2} (291.76 sq mi)
- Elevation: 77 m (253 ft)

Population (2022)
  - Rank: 7th in Serbia
  - City: 73,401
  - Administrative: 115,454
  - Administrative density: 152.79/km^{2} (395.71/sq mi)
- Demonym: Pančevac (sr)
- Time zone: UTC+1 (CET)
  - Summer (DST): UTC+2 (CEST)
- Postal code: 26000
- Area code: +381(0)13
- ISO 3166 code: SRB
- Car plates: PA
- Official languages: Serbian together with Bulgarian in Ivanovo, Romanian in Banatsko Novo Selo, Macedonian in Jabuka and Hungarian in Ivanovo and Vojlovica
- Website: www.pancevo.rs

Pančevo (Serbian Cyrillic: Панчево, pronounced [pâːntʃeʋo]; German: Pantschowa; Hungarian: Pancsova; Romanian: Panciova; Slovak: Pánčevo) is a city and the administrative center of the South Banat District in the autonomous province of Vojvodina, Serbia. It is located on the shores of rivers Tamiš and Danube, in the southern part of Banat region. Since the 2022 census 115,454 people have been living in the Pančevo administrative area. Pančevo is the third largest city in Vojvodina and the sixth largest in Serbia by population (of the city only).

Pančevo was first mentioned in 1153 and was described as an important mercantile place. It gained the status of a city in 1873 following the disestablishment of the Military Frontier in that region. For most of its period, it was part of the Kingdom of Hungary and after 1920 it became part of the Kingdom of Serbs, Croats and Slovenes, which was renamed in 1929 to Yugoslavia. Since then with one interruption it was part of several Yugoslav states and after the dissolution of the latest in 2003, it is part of its successor state, Serbia. Pančevo is notable for being multi-ethnic, Serbs (and Germans until 1945) have been the dominant ethnic group since the 16th century and since 2011 they compose 80% of the total population of the city.

Pančevo is a city with rich cultural events and monuments, and in the past, it also used to be a filming location for many national and international movie productions. Since 2003 an international and multi-cultural carnival has been organized in the city. It is also the main economic center of the South Banat region and its economy is also mostly tied up to Belgrade's economy. HIP factory is located in Pančevo as well as UTVA which was heavily damaged during the bombing of Yugoslavia in 1999. Pančevo is also well known for its brewery and silk factory which were founded in the early 18th century, and as well as the light bulb factory which are all now defunct. Pančevo is also home to many historical objects, museums and parks.

== Etymology ==
In Serbian and Macedonian, the town is known as Pančevo (Панчево), in Hungarian as Pancsova, in Slovak as Pánčevo, in Romanian as Panciova and in German as Pantschowa. The place name is probably derived from an old Slavonic term and meant location of marsh.

== History ==
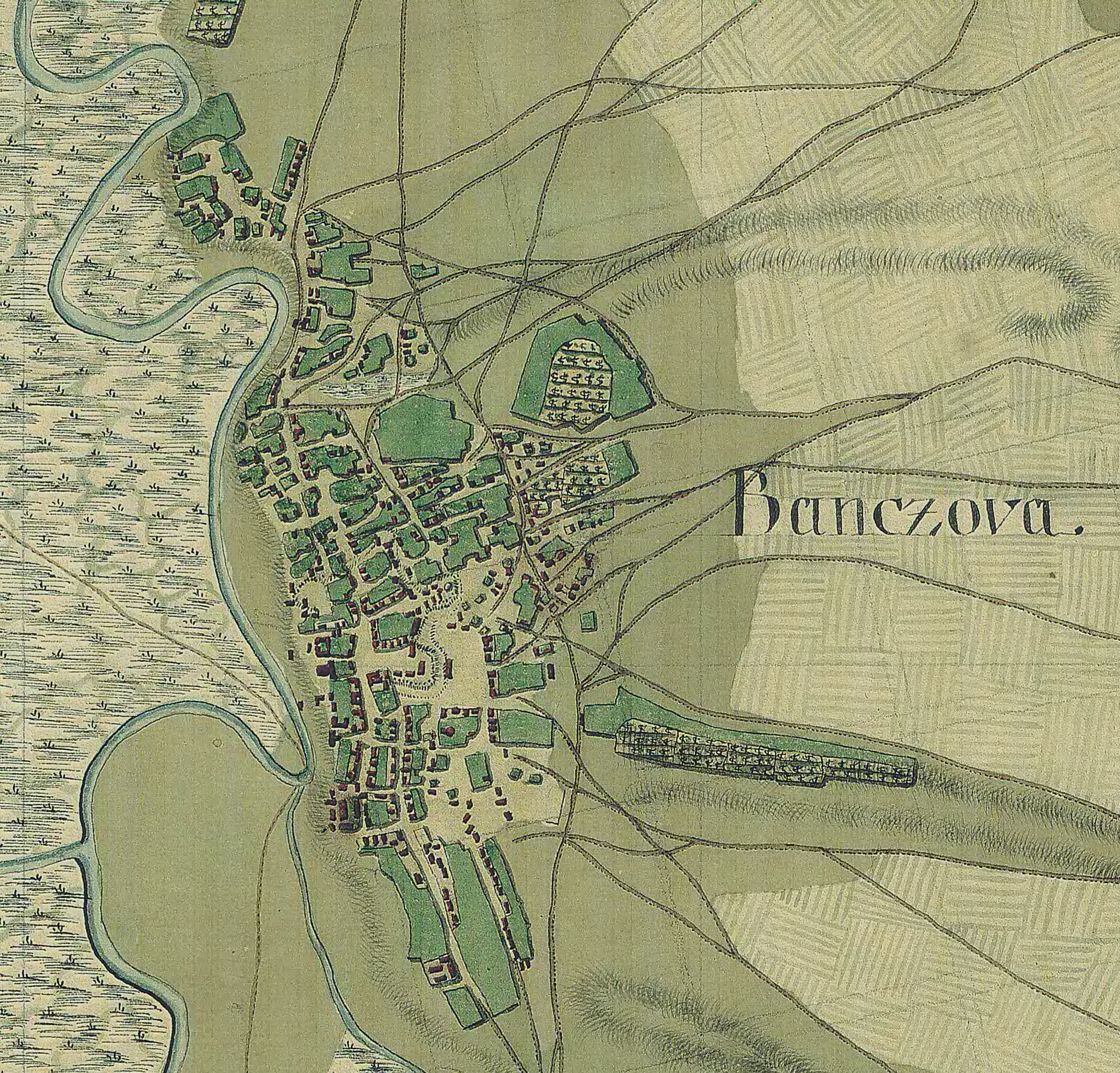
National Archives of Austria, Map of Josephinian Land Survey (1769–1772), city without still existing fortification

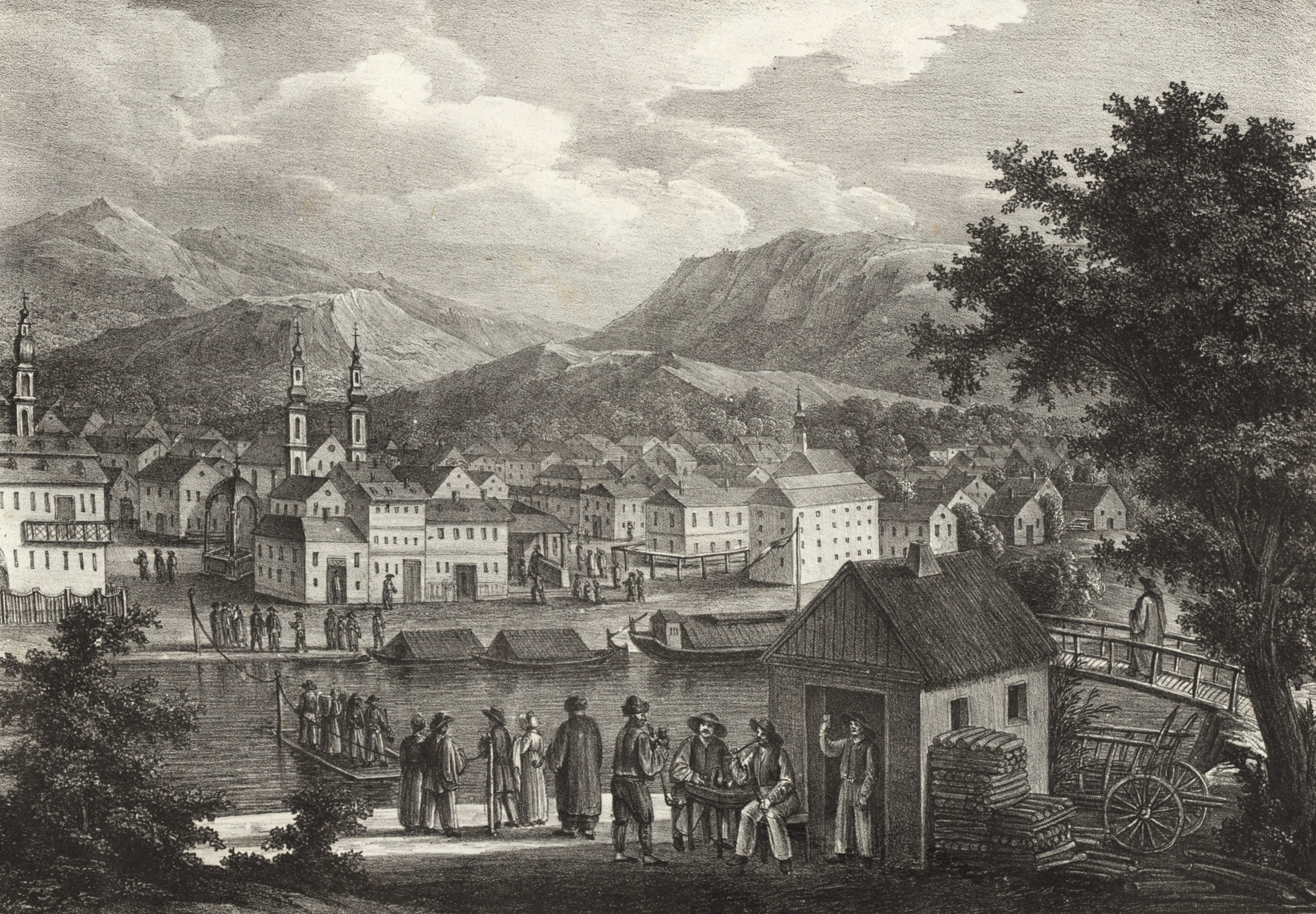
1826 lithograph of Pančevo by Adolph Friedrich Kunike

In the late 19th and early 20th century many archaeological artifacts of the Stone Age period were found, remains of settlements and places of burial from the times of Bronze Age (Urnfield culture) and Ancient Rome on the urban area. Most of the objects are exhibited at the National Museum of the town.

In 1154, Arabic Muslim geographer Muhammad al-Idrisi described region in his Book of Pleasant Journeys into Faraway Lands as an important mercantile place. The regional area was administered by the Bulgarian Empire until early 11th century, then by the Kingdom of Hungary until it became part of the Ottoman Empire in 1521. During Turkish rule, the region was part of the Temeşvar Eyalet and mostly populated by Serbs. In 1660, Evliya Çelebi described the town as a quadrangular fortification being diameter of one hundred Turkish feet. During the Austro-Turkish War, the fortification was conquered by Imperial troops under supreme command of Claude Florimond de Mercy in 1716. There is an impression of the old city and its fortification recorded on maps from 1717 and 1720 which are located at National Széchényi Library and Institute of Military History in Budapest. After the Treaty of Požarevac, the urban area belonged to the Habsburg Banat, and temporarily served as garrison of the Habsburg Imperial Army. In December 1764, a military commission of Viennese Hofkriegsrat registered all people and number of more or less habitable houses, and the Habsburg government encouraged massive immigration of German settlers for administrative furnishing and developing new district of Military Frontier. In January 1794, Francis II signed the charter of borough rights of Pančevo, there is no other real evidence like a deed of city founding. In 1852, the fortification was slighted for urban expanding. In 1873, the military frontier was abolished and Pančevo included into the Torontál county of Austria-Hungary. In 1902, cadastral maps of the town were recorded which are located at the National Archives of Hungary.

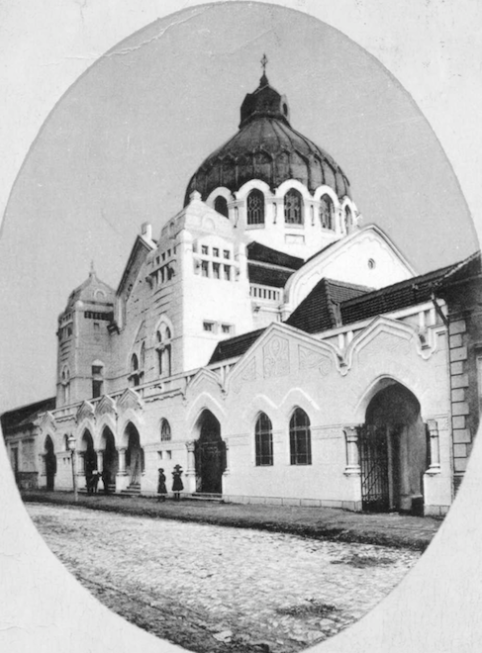
Historical Synagogue, building and land lot was confiscated by Danube Swabians of Autonomous Banat

After the Austrian-Hungarian Armistice of Villa Giusti, the region became part of the provisional Torontalsko-tamiške županja and due to the Treaty of Trianon finally belonged to the Kingdom of Yugoslavia. In 1922, the region was structured into the Belgrade oblast and since 1929 into the Dunavska banovina.

=== Effects of World War II on City life ===
I visit a former Viennese acquaintance who has been living as an emigrant for years in Belgrade. And when I tell him that I want to visit relatives of a deceased friend in Pančevo, he recommends me: Germans live there. Open your eyes - and shut your mouth. Franz Theodor Csokor, March 1941.

In April 1941, Pančevo was occupied during the invasion of Yugoslavia by Germany. On 21-22 April, 1941, Wehrmacht soldiers, led by Johann Hubert Steinmair, committed a war crime massacre in the city when 36 Serbian people were murdered by hanging and shooting as a reprisal for the deaths of 9 Volksdeutsche members of the paramilitary formation Mannschaft, a part of the SS Division Das Reich, and a wounded comrade of that division, attacked by three men of the Royal Yugoslavian Army before the state surrender. On April 11, 1941, Royal Cavalry officers Stevan Rikanović, Saša Rakezić and Milan Orlić gave a signal during the German parade that they did not accept the looming Yugoslavian defeat. They erected temporary scaffolding behind a wall of a Catholic cemetery and fired at the Nazi Mannschaft, who, after overcoming that surprise, returned fire immediately, assisted by two SS men who had been seated in a nearby German café. On April 6, 1941, members of the Mannschaft had already daubed anti-semitic slogans on some graves in this cemetery; some gravestones were badly damaged, too, but they put on the grave of Georg Weifert a wreath with a decorated swastika ribbon. The following day, pro-German groups marched through all the streets, smashed windows of Serbian shops and taunted, spat and beat Serbian civilians because "they had to stay in their homes and were not allowed to go out." On April 17, 1941, there was a power demonstration with a deployment of Mannschaft units in front of City Hall Square, and an incendiary speech by Kreisführer Otto Vogenberger from the balcony of the building, in which he spoke about the "liberation of regional Germans from Yugoslav slavery" and announced "three days of celebrations until the birthday of our Führer." On April 20, 1941, the Kreisführer was personally gifted with a portrait of Hitler by Heinrich Knirr, who was "visiting his beloved homeland". On May 1, 1941, selected policemen from the Banatian State Guard were publicly sworn in at the same place with black uniforms and a Totenkopf on their collar, speaking words such as "protecting the rights and lives of German people," although they had already been recruited in April. Propaganda photos and film of the reprisal massacre were used decades after the event to help chronicle the Wehrmacht's complicity in the atrocities during the war, often manipulated in German-language TV documentaries.

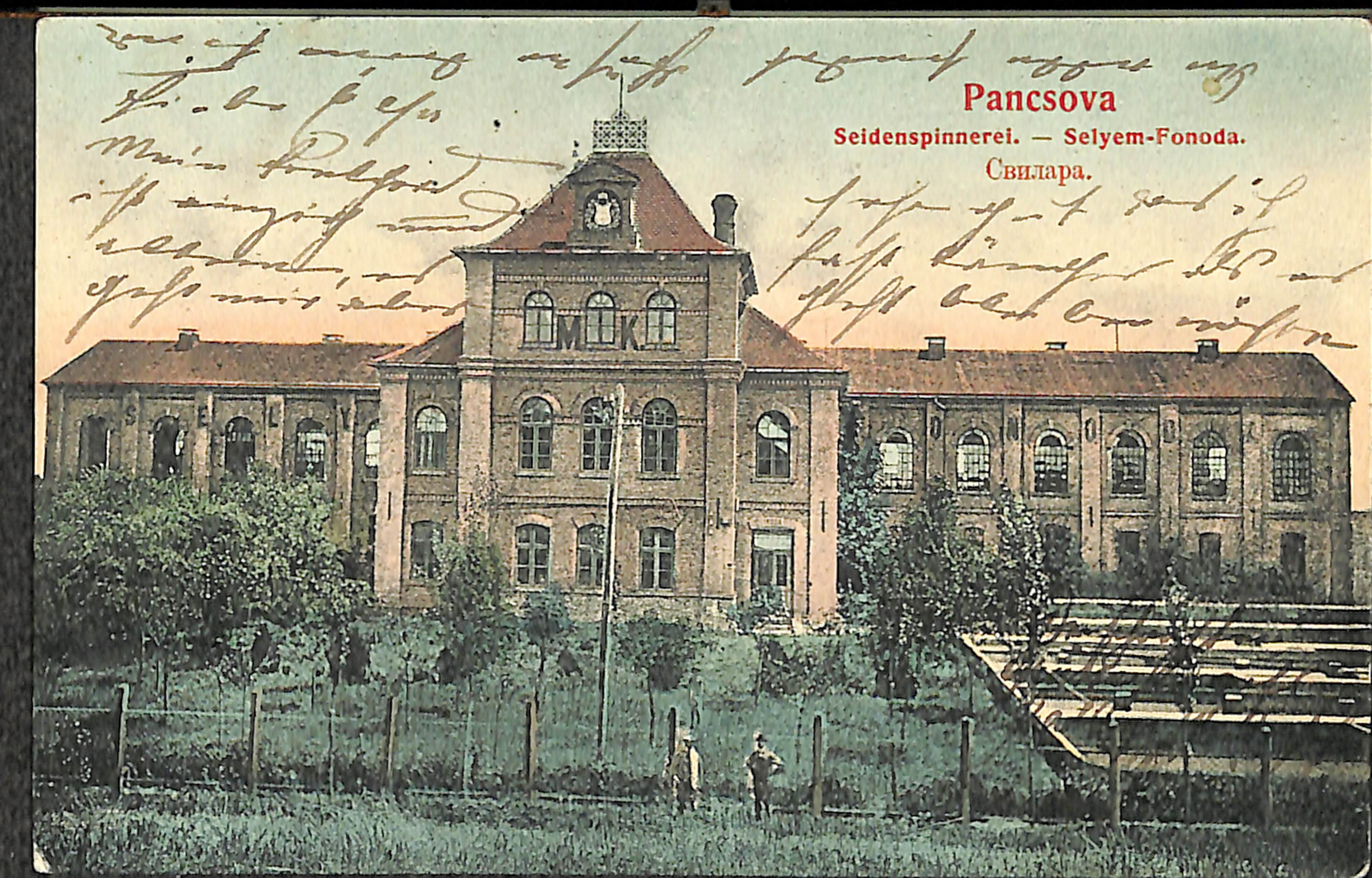
Svilara, Headquarter of Banater Staatswache since April 1941 and OZNA since October 1944.

During World War II in Yugoslavia, Pančevo was part of Autonomous Banat within German-occupied Serbia. Selected Danube Swabian men were recruited and conscripted in Mannschaft, in Waffen-SS, the majority of them either in SS-Division Das Reich, in German Police or SS Freiwilligen Gebirgsjäger Division Prinz Eugen. More than 99.99 percent of local German women and youth were organized in formations such as the Deutsche Frauenschaft and the Deutsche Jugend (including the DMB) and dedicated to Nazism. In 1943, the Südostdeutsche Forschungsgemeinschaft issued a very treacherously worded census with the note "for official use only," stating that "there are amazingly fifty eight 'orthodox Germans' in it," which is a phrase used to describe collaborators of Romanian origin. In 1944, after the defeat of the German Wehrmacht and the Waffen-SS during the Belgrade Offensive by the Allied Armies, a part of the German population left the city, together with the defeated German army. In November 1944, in cooperation with the OZNA, a KNOJ brigade was set up to denazify the region, consisting of 20 elite partisans who volunteered to execute symbolic deterrent measures under the supreme command of Brigade Commander Svetozar Rupić. All measures began for the first time in January 1945 after intensive research and determination of the execution sites. The rest of the ethnic German population remained in the country. These people were sent to local internment camps which existed until 1948. After their dissolution, much of the ethnic German population left Yugoslavia for economic reasons. From 1945, the city belonged to the Srez Pančevo of the Socialist Federal Republic of Yugoslavia and the Federal Republic of Yugoslavia. The city was the administrative center of the region from all these centuries to the present.

== Geography ==
Pančevo is located on flat plains at 44°52′14″N 20°38′25″E, approximately 17 km NE of Pančevo bridge to Belgrade and 43 km NW of Smederevo. The altitude above sea level is 77 meters. The southern city quarters are located on the bank of the Danube, the western quarters to the bank of Tamiš. The Danube river islands Forkontumac and Čakljanac are southernmost part of urban area.

=== Climate ===
Pančevo has a humid subtropical climate (Köppen climate classification: Cfa).

Climate data for Pančevo
Month	Jan	Feb	Mar	Apr	May	Jun	Jul	Aug	Sep	Oct	Nov	Dec	Year
Mean daily maximum °C (°F)	4.5 (40.1)	6.9 (44.4)	12.6 (54.7)	18.3 (64.9)	23.0 (73.4)	26.6 (79.9)	28.8 (83.8)	29.0 (84.2)	23.6 (74.5)	18.0 (64.4)	12.1 (53.8)	5.7 (42.3)	17.4 (63.4)
Daily mean °C (°F)	1.0 (33.8)	2.8 (37.0)	7.7 (45.9)	13.4 (56.1)	18.2 (64.8)	22.0 (71.6)	24.0 (75.2)	24.1 (75.4)	18.9 (66.0)	13.5 (56.3)	8.2 (46.8)	2.5 (36.5)	13.0 (55.4)
Mean daily minimum °C (°F)	−2.2 (28.0)	−1.0 (30.2)	2.9 (37.2)	8.3 (46.9)	13.0 (55.4)	16.9 (62.4)	18.8 (65.8)	19.0 (66.2)	14.5 (58.1)	9.6 (49.3)	5.1 (41.2)	−0.3 (31.5)	8.7 (47.7)
Average precipitation mm (inches)	50 (2.0)	49 (1.9)	56 (2.2)	65 (2.6)	73 (2.9)	82 (3.2)	72 (2.8)	57 (2.2)	60 (2.4)	53 (2.1)	53 (2.1)	58 (2.3)	728 (28.7)
Source: Climate-Data.org

=== Flora and fauna ===
==== Birds ====
Nature reserves near the city, the coastal areas of the rivers Tamiš and Danube, as well as numerous islands, are a habitat for over 100 species of birds, 63 species of which are natural rarities.

The City Forest with over 300 hectares, and the National Garden, the largest city park with almost 15 hectares, are located just a few minutes walk from the center of Pančevo and are home to many species of birds.

A particularly important bird habitat, in addition to the Ponjavica Nature Park and the Ivanovačka Ada Special Nature Reserve, is the Deliblato Sands Special Nature Reserve, which is partly located in Pančevo.

The notable bird species found in Pančevo are the white-tailed eagle, black storks, bullfinch and black-winged stilt. The first lowland feeding ground in Serbia for the white-tailed eagle, which is on the list of endangered species, was built on the territory of Pančevo.

=== Local communities ===
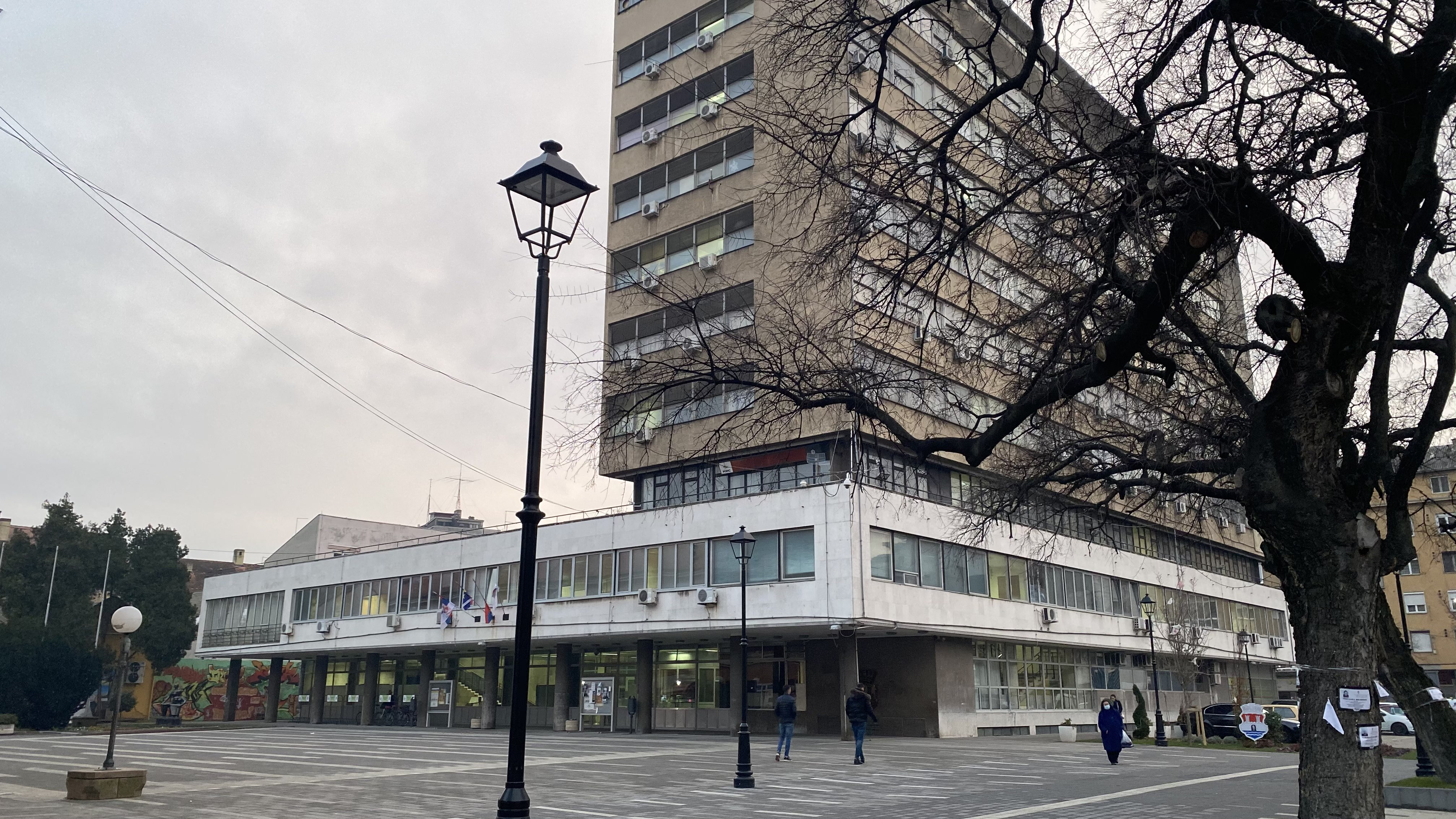
Main municipal building

The administration of the municipality of Pančevo is structured in 9 local communities (Mesna zajednica, singular; abbreviation MZ) of seven villages, two towns and the city of Pančevo, structured in eight local communities of eight city districts with several quarters.

==== Administrative area structure ====
Community (MZ)	Banatski Brestovac	Banatsko Novo Selo	Dolovo	Glogonj	Ivanovo	Jabuka	Kačarevo	Omoljica	Starčevo	Pančevo City
Area (km^{2})	61,905	98,955	117,176	42,775	42,567	51,786	39,706	77,262	62,066	161,373

The administrative area differs to the historical administrative area. From 1946 to 1959, the historical municipality (Srez) was structured in 23 communities, including today's communities and the villages and cities of Baranda, Borča, Crepaja, Debeljača, Idvor, Kovačica, Opovo, Ovča, Padina, Sakule, Sefkerin, Uzdin and Vojlovica. The city district Vojlovica was added to the town in 1978.

==== City administrative structure ====
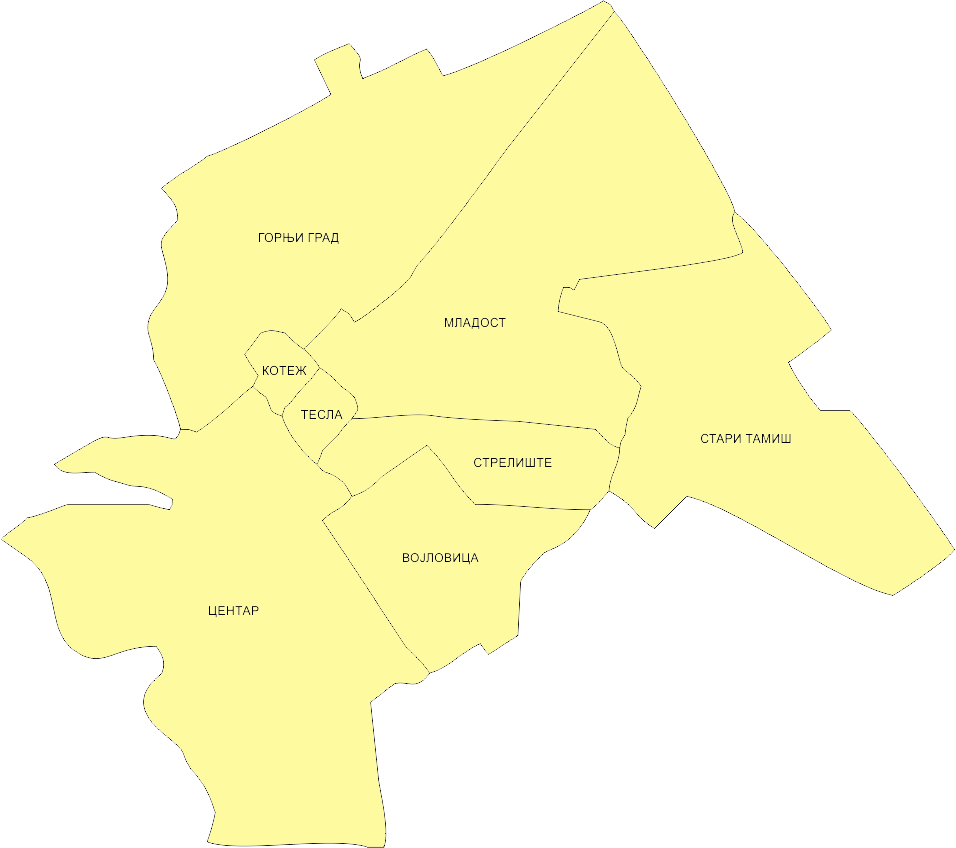
City districts of Pančevo Municipality of Pančevo

MZ Centar:
- Donji grad
- Zelengora
- Mali London (Mali Rit)
- Sodara
- Topola
- Utvina kolonija

MZ Gornji grad:

- Karaula
- Skrobara

MZ Kotež:

- Kotež 1
- Kotež 2

MZ Mladost:

- Kudeljarski nasip
- Stara Misa
- Misa vinogradi (Nova Misa)

MZ Stari Tamiš

MZ Strelište

MZ Tesla

MZ Vojlovica

== Demographics ==
In 1687, Habsburg's Hofkriegsrath military commission in Banja Luka conscripted entire population of that city and recruited 37 families of Muslim faith selectively for settling in Pančevo circle of Military region excepted any national interpretation.

In 1698, Habsburg's Hofkriegsrath military commission conscripted the entire village population of Bela Crkva and recruited 2 Woman selectively for using as prostitutes in Pančevo City, but named as Raitzische Gypsies.

In 1733, Habsburg's Hofkriegsrath military commission conscripted entire population of Pančevo City including neighborhood settlement and namend 15 Military prostitutes as Raizinen.

In 1764, Habsburg's Hofkriegsrath military commission conscripted during passage control in Reichshaupt u. Residenzstadt 29 male persons and 10 female for Danube transporting to Pančevo so that they can further develop trade and finances there and professional named as Jews.

In 1802, Habsburg's Hofkriegsrath military commission, had been conscripted 15 families of Orthodox faith in total Pančevo region.

In 1809, there were 935 households recorded in Pančevo and 5,800 residents. By 1882, the population had increased to 13,408, of whom the vast majority were Serbs.

Historical population
Year	Pop.	±%
1809	5,800	—
1882	13,408	+131.2%
1948	30,516	+127.6%
1953	34,748	+13.9%
1961	46,679	+34.3%
1971	61,588	+31.9%
1981	71,009	+15.3%
1991	72,793	+2.5%
2002	77,087	+5.9%
2011	76,203	−1.1%
2022	73,401	−3.7%

As of the 2022 census, the city proper has a population of 73,401, while the administrative area has a population of 115,454, 57% more than the city proper.

Ethnicity of administrative area (2011 census)
Total	Serbs	Macedonians	Hungarians	Romanians
123,414	97,499	4,558	3,422	3,173
123,414	Roma	Slovaks	Croats	Others
123,414	2,118	1,411	880	10,353

== Economy ==
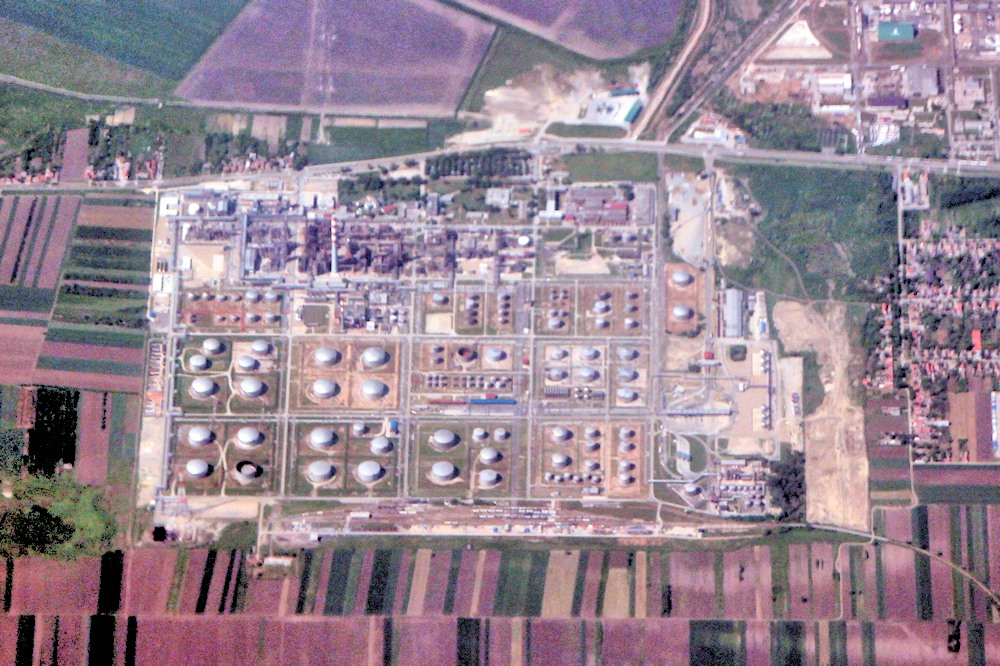
Bird's eye view of NIS oil refinery

Pančevo is the economic center of South Banat District. There are many industrial companies in processing of oil, steel, aluminum, glass, corn, grain, in metalworking, in producing petrochemicals, fertilizer, commercial packaging, PET molding machines, clothes, grain mill products, bacon and other food, in construction of aircraft, thermal power stations and buildings of steel beams.

Pančevo's economy is tied up with Belgrade economy, as the distance between the cities is only 14 kilometers. The industrial site of NIS refinery is the largest one of all refineries in Serbia. In 1999, the industrial site was strategically bombed by NATO bombing of Yugoslavia.

Precise targets included the refinery, the town's airport, the Utva aircraft industry and HIP factory. The UNEP reported in studies about soil and groundwater contamination caused by NATO bombardment. The contamination is a long-term threat to natural environment and human health.

There are two protected natural resources located in surroundings of the city, the natural monument Ivanov's island (Serbian Ivanovačka ada) and the Nature Park Ponjavica.

The following table gives a preview of total number of registered people employed in legal entities per their core activity (as of 2022):

Activity	Total
Agriculture, forestry and fishing	584
Mining and quarrying	54
Manufacturing	9,195
Electricity, gas, steam and air conditioning supply	493
Water supply; sewerage, waste management and remediation activities	632
Construction	1,903
Wholesale and retail trade, repair of motor vehicles and motorcycles	5,775
Transportation and storage	1,964
Accommodation and food services	1,186
Information and communication	496
Financial and insurance activities	453
Real estate activities	72
Professional, scientific and technical activities	1,490
Administrative and support service activities	1,033
Public administration and defense; compulsory social security	1,708
Education	2,433
Human health and social work activities	2,546
Arts, entertainment and recreation	535
Other service activities	675
Individual agricultural workers	419
Total	33,649

== Education ==
There are 12 primary and 10 secondary schools in Pančevo, including the Gymnasium founded in 1863. Among its notable students are Mihajlo Pupin and Uroš Predić, after whom the Gymnasium was named in 1958.

== Culture ==
=== Cultural institutions and events ===
The oldest cultural institution of the city is the Serbian Church Choral Society, founded in 1838 and the oldest still existing Choral Society of today's Serbia. Since its inception, probably the most famous of all honorable choirmasters is Davorin Jenko, who conducted the choir from 1863 to 1865. In the present, the choir is conducted for the fourth time in a continuous sequence by a woman. The most important Cultural Center of the city (Kulturni Centar Pančeva) is located in the former theater building of the city, founded in 1947 and named National Theater which realized play productions in cooperation with National Theater Novi Sad. In 1956, the political authorities of the town decided the creation of a cultural center which is representing variety of all Arts. The center has a gallery of Modern art, and it promotes continuous festivals like Biennial of Art (Bijenale umetnosti), the music festival Ethno.com and the Pančevački Jazz Festival with artists from all over the world. In addition, some theater productions are shown annually in cooperation with National Theater Belgrade and other famous institutions. In 2012, the center published all popular stories of Zigomar Comics in a collected edition. Since 1977, the House of Youth (Dom omladine) is venue of the event Rukopisi (Manuscripts) where young writers are presented each year. The facility also promotes many other events like FreeDOM Art Festival. There is also the continuous Film festival PAFF worth mentioning which has a good reputation beyond the region. In the past, the city has been filming location for many national and international movie productions, including well known movies such as La Tour, prends garde!, The Mongols, I Even Met Happy Gypsies, Balkan Express, Black Cat, White Cat and Coriolanus.

Since 2004, each year in June the Pančevački Carnival become the most important event of its kind in Serbia. The highlight of the event is the parade which goes through the center with more than over 3,000 international participants and up to 100,000 visitors annually. The city is a member of the Federation of European Carnival Cities.

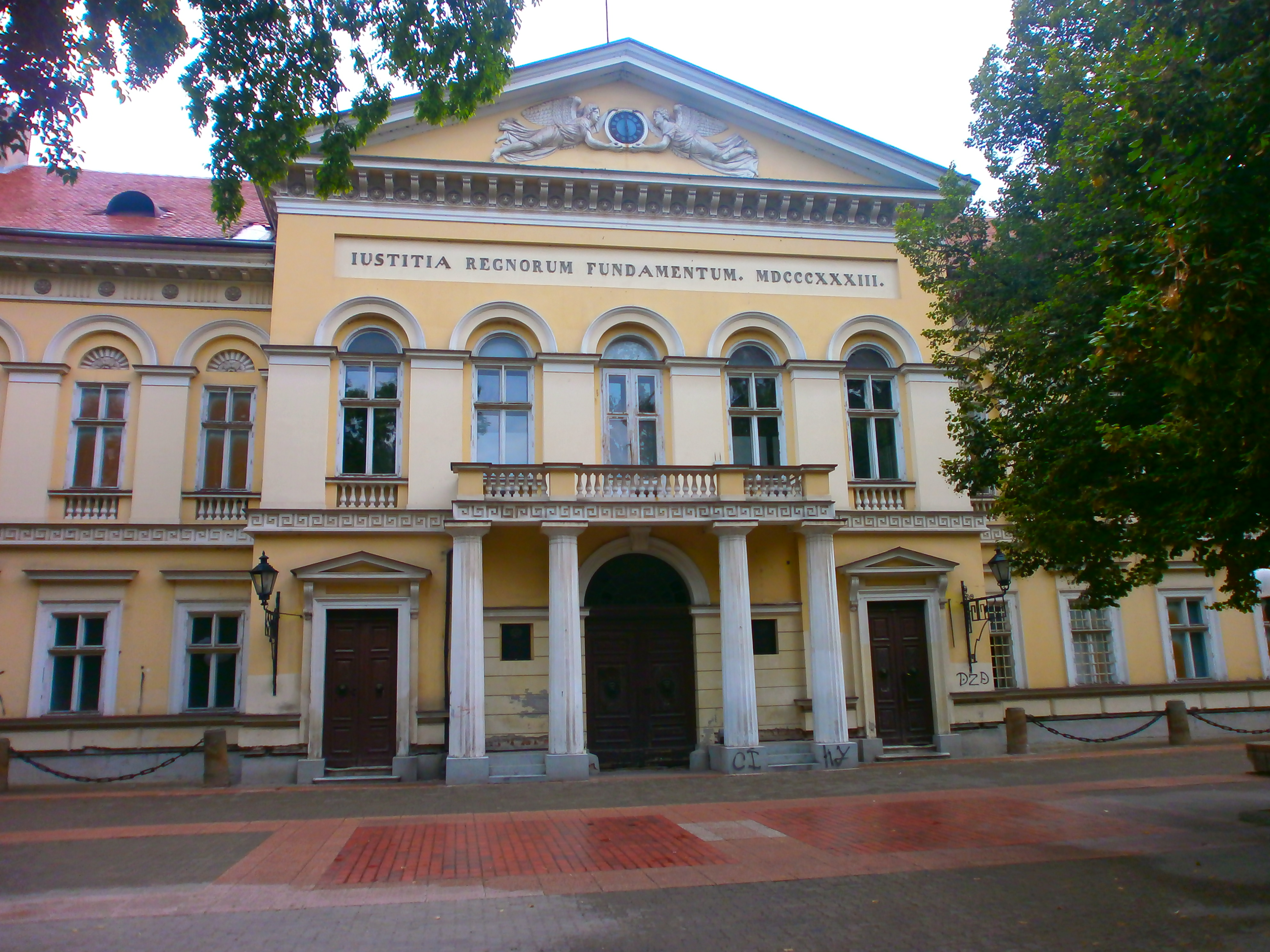
National Museum

The National Museum was founded in 1923 and it is located in former neoclassical city hall since several decades. The institution has a valuable permanent exhibition and it is one of the most important museums of Vojvodina. The Vajfert Brewery is located in the town's center and it is the oldest one of today's Serbia, founded in 1722 by Abraham Kepiš from Bratislava. The brewery was run by the Vajfert family for several generations and its most famous represent was Đorđe Vajfert. After closing in 2008 and a conflagration in 2010, the building complex was a ruin in recent years. In 2015, the city began to realize a concept for revitalizing the industrial heritage and in the following year, the Đorđe Vajfert Brewery Museum was opened in the presence of the Austrian and German ambassadors. In the same year, a new summer festival called Vajfert Days was held for the first time. The intention of the organizer is to promote the tourist, cultural, artistic and economic potential of the city. There is an archive of the city, founded in 1947 and it is located in former barracks of Austrian-Hungarian Army. The archive collects and preserves materials of town's history from all centuries.

=== Cultural monuments ===
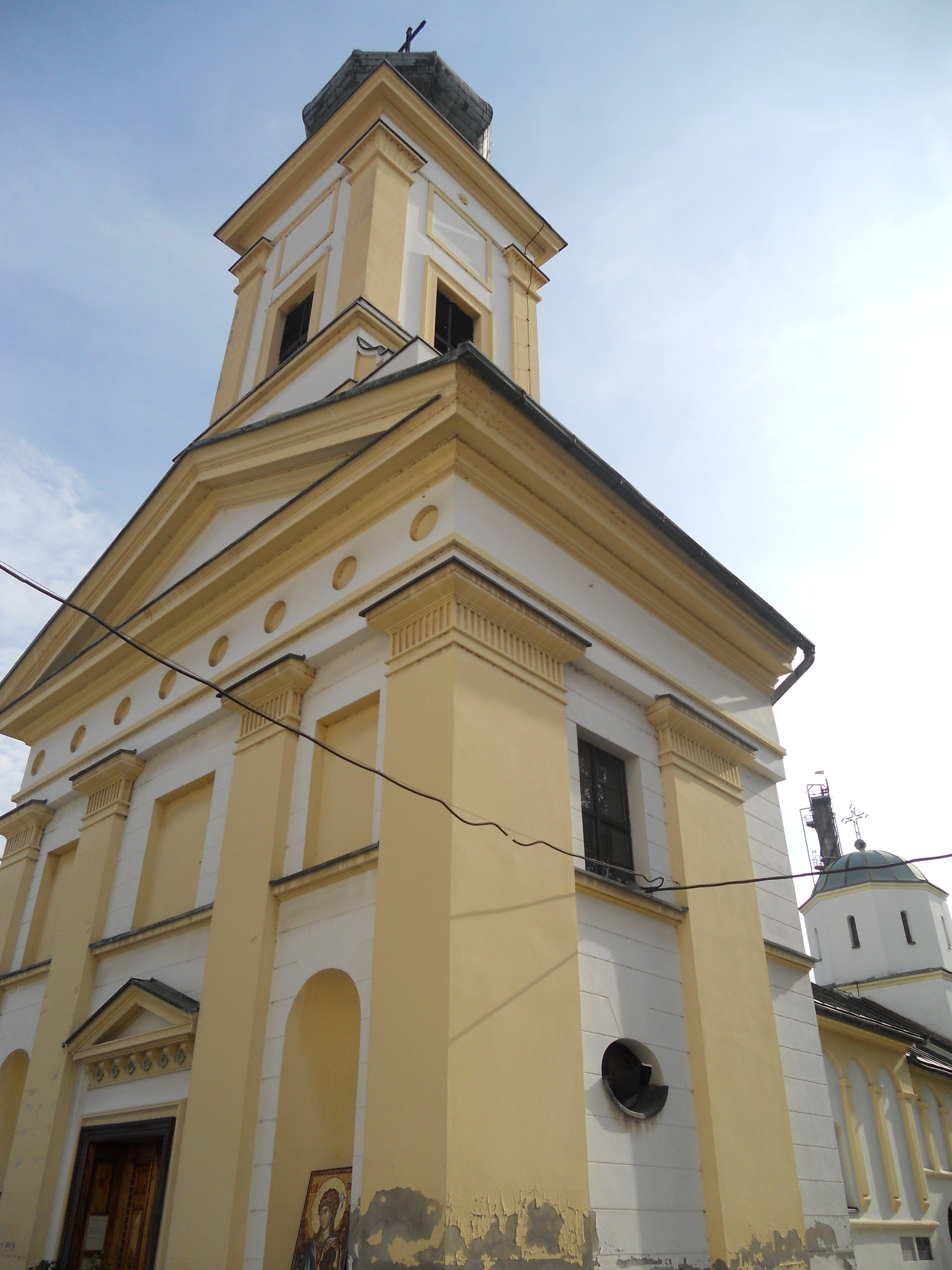
Vojlovica Monastery

Pančevo's Vojlovica monastery is one of the oldest monasteries of Vojvodina, the oldest sacral building complex of the city and declared Cultural Monument of Exceptional Importance. In 1542, the monastery was first mentioned by hegumen Jeronomah Parfenije in a Serbian almanac of Božidar Vuković. The church of the monastery is dedicated to Archangels Michael and Gabriel and was transformed into neoclassical stile towards the end of 18th century. From 1942 to 1944, some Orthodox dignitaries such as Gavrilo V were temporarily imprisoned in the monastery and the entire building complex was observed by members of Deutsche Mannschaft including obligation to regularly report for Banater Staatswache. The oldest church in town is the Roman Catholic Church Saint Charles Borromeo, built from 1756 to 1757 and in 1768, the building was extended with a steeple which was equipped with a turret clock in 1868 to mark its centenary. Its column in the square in front of the building with statue of Abraham and Isaac was built in 1722. The building was previously used as a provisional church of a Minorite monastery. The religious order provided the military chaplains for the garrison of the Imperial Army. The Serbian Orthodox Church Assumption of Holy Virgin was built from 1807 to 1811. The iconostasis of the church was designed by the painter Konstantin Danil from 1828 to 1833. The urban Institute for Protection of Cultural Monuments supports the maintenance and restoration of Pančevo's Cultural Heritage.

== Sports ==
There are some popular sporting clubs in town, the football (soccer) team FK Železničar Pančevo, the women's football club ŽFK, the basketball club KK Tamiš and the American football team Pančevo Panthers. Currently, the most successful athlete is Slobodan Bitević who lives in the city. Dušan Borković is a Serbian auto racing driver from Pančevo. He was the two time European champion 2012 European Hill Climb Championship and 2015 European Touring Car Cup, and also a member of the National Assembly of Serbia from 2016 to 2020.

The Sports and Recreation Center "Mladost" is the home field of FK Železničar as well as providing facilities for jogging, handball, basketball and other sports. A pitch has also been built that can be used for futsal.

== Media ==
The weekly newspaper Pančevac is oldest one of still existing print media in Serbia, founded in 1869, weekly newspaper Libertatea is most widely used print media of Romanians in Serbia, its first edition has been published in May 1945. The most used local mass media is RTV Pančevo. The TV station started broadcasting its programs in 1992.

== Infrastructure ==
=== Transportation ===
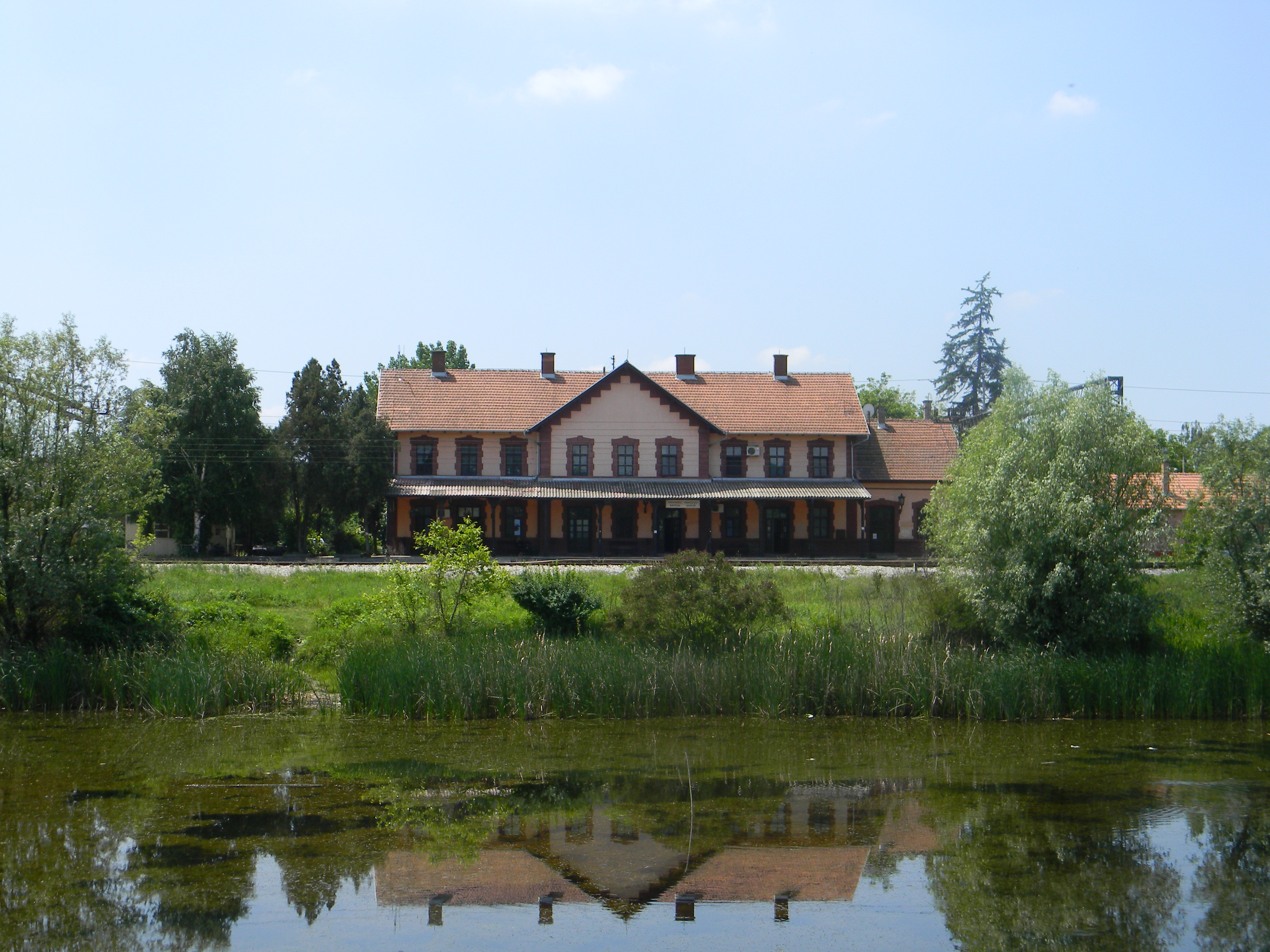
Railway station Pančevo Varoš

The most important road that runs through Pančevo is the European route E70 which forms a bypass around the city center, connecting the city with Belgrade. The IB-14 highway to Smederevo via Kovin starts here, and so does the IIA-130 highway to Ečka. As the most important regional mode of transport on road is made available a bus route network for public passenger traffic by Autotransport Pančevo since 1948.

Having a relatively small population, Pančevo has no less than four passenger railway stations: Pančevo Glavna stanica, Pančevo Varoš, Pančevo Strelište and Pančevo Vojlovica. Apart from these, Serbian Railways also serve some important industries, such as NIS oil refinery and mineral fertilizer HIP-Azotara. In April 1894, the city was connected to the European railways net.

The municipality lies on left bank downriver of Danube which is one of the Europe's main waterways. The new harbor was built in 1947, Tamiš discharges into Danube just outside the town of Pančevo.

== Landmarks ==
One of the most prominent and famous parts of the city is the park, located in central Pančevo.

In late 2021, the reconstruction of the park began. JKP Zelenilo hired the Faculty of Forestry to do a detailed estimate of the health of trees located in the park, the JKP Vodovod i kanalizacija were hired to work on the reconstruction of the plumbing, rainwater and sewage pipes.

In March 2022 a small playground for children has been added in front of the Tax Administration office.

Near the city, there are lighthouses at the confluence of the Tamiš and the Danube, built during the Austro-Hungarian Empire.

== International relations ==
=== Twin towns and sister cities ===
Pančevo is twinned with:

- Bonyhád, Hungary
- Boulogne-Billancourt, France
- Byala Slatina, Bulgaria
- Kumanovo, North Macedonia
- Michalovce, Slovakia
- Mrkonjić Grad, Bosnia and Herzegovina
- Neapoli, Greece
- Prijedor, Bosnia and Herzegovina
- Ravenna Province, Italy
- Reșița, Romania
- Stavroupoli, Greece
- Stupino, Russia
- Voskresensk, Russia

=== Partnership ===
- Tarragona, Spain

== Notable people ==
- Lorenc Šaringer (1794–1852), since 1804 father's assistant for establishing the Glogon School of Tree Planting; from 1809 until first half of 1815 assigned for further training in Schönnbrunn Orangerie.
- Vasa Živković (1819–1891), poet and priest
- Dragomir Krančević (1847–1929), violinist
- Đorđe Vajfert (1850–1937), industrialist and Governor of the National Bank of Serbia and later Yugoslavia
- Ljubica Luković (1858–1915), President of Circle of Serbian Sisters
- Ludwig von Graff (1851–1924), zoologist
- Heinrich Knirr (1862–1944), painter of official portrait of Adolf Hitler
- Jovan Erdeljanović (1874–1944), ethnologist
- Nikola Živančević (1845–1895, Glogon), Exhibitor of fresh food without artificial additives at Viennese Exhibitions 1873; Ancestor of Nina Živančević
- Milan Ćurčin (1880–1960), poet and editor
- Franc Lišic (1907, Glogon–1943, Baščaršija), Economics Battalion of Waffen SS Volunteer Mountain Hunter Division PRINZ EUGEN, killed by SS Scharführer Sebastian Kurz: Insubordination
- Svetozar Rupić (1922–1987), Combat Veteran of Yugoslavian Partizans and KNOJ Battalion Commander.
- Nenad Trifunovski (1923–2014), journalist, performance artist and creator of the Stratište Kod Pančeva Memorial.
- Milorad Bata Mihailović (1923–2011), painter
- Alexis Guedroitz (1923–1992), professor of Russian language and literature
- Olja Ivanjicki (1931–2009), artist
- Stevan Bena (1935–2012), football player
- Zlatoje Martinov (born 1953), journalist and writer
- Zoran Gajić (born 1958), volleyball trainer
- Milan Orlić (born 1962), laureate of several literary awards
- Aleksandar Zograf (born 1963), cartoonist
- Slobodan Beštić (born 1964), actor
- Milenko Topić (born 1969), basketball player, World and European champion
- Bobby Despotovski (born 1971), Australian footballer
- Igor Kokoškov (born 1971), NBA basketball coach
- Marinika Tepić (born 1974), politician
- Mirjana Pović (born 1981), Astrophysicist
- Marina Munćan (born 1982), athlete, Universiade champion
- Dušan Borković (born 1984), auto racing driver, two time European champion.
- Nađa Higl (born 1987), swimmer, World champion
- Srđan Nikolovski (born 1989), physician and medical scientist
- Nemanja Dangubić (born 1993), basketball player
- Kosta Novaković (born 1996), strength & conditioning coach/rehab specialist, Serbian National Rowing Team Captain, "Little Miss Sunshine"
- Anja Crevar (born 2000), swimmer, Gold medalist at the European Junior Championships

== See also ==
- Hungarian Cultural Association Petőfi Sándor Pančevo
- Pančevački Rit
- List of cities in Serbia
- Historical Archive of Pančevo

== Sources ==
=== Books ===
- Đorđević, Jelena; Đorđević, Vojislav, eds. (2020). Arheološka topografija područja grada Pančeva I [Archaeological Topography of the Area of the City of Pančevo I] (in Serbian). Narodni muzej Pančevo. ISBN 978-86-901096-2-3.
- Lukić, Vesna (2011). Demografski razvitak i funkcionalna struktura Pančeva [Demographic Development and Functional Structure of Pančevo] (in Serbian). Geografski institut "Jovan Cvijić". ISBN 9788680029535.
- Matijević, Andrea; Spasojević, Nenad, eds. (2023). Perspektive političkih nauka u savremenom društvu: zbornik radova [Perspectives of Political Science in Contemporary Society: Collection of Papers] (in Serbian). Institut za političke studije. ISBN 978-86-7419-372-3.
  - Matijević, Andrea. "Transparentnost rada javne uprave na nivou lokalne samouprave – studija slučaja: Grad Pančevo". In Matijević & Spasojević (2023), pp. 83–112.
- Nikolić-Bujanović, Ljiljana; Mrazovac Kurilić, Sanja, eds. (2024). The Fourth International Conference on Sustainable Environment and Technologies: proceedings: 27-28 September 2024, Cara Dušana 62-64, Belgrade, Serbia. University "Union Nikola Tesla". ISBN 978-86-89529-46-3.
  - Marić, Nenad; Takashima, Hiroshi; Nakano, Takeshi; Jerkov, Vesna; Slavković Beškoski, Latinka; Beškoski, Vladimir. "Assessment of groundwater contamination in the south industrial zone of Pančevo". In Nikolić-Bujanović & Mrazovac Kurilić (2024), pp. 201–215.
- Orlić, Milan (2016). Pančevo, varoš gde se Dunav uliva u Tamiš [Pančevo, a town where the Danube flows into Tamiš] (in Serbian). Mali Nemo. ISBN 978-86-7972-101-3.
- Perović, Slobodanka; Miloševski, Nikola, eds. (2022). 150 godina od ukidanja Banatske vojne granice [150 Years Since the Abolition of the Banat Military Border] (in Serbian). Zavod za zaštitu spomenika kulture u Pančevu. ISBN 978-86-83677-27-6.
  - Delić, Nino. "Populacioni razvoj vojnog komuniteta / grada Pančeva 1795–1910". In Perović & Miloševski (2022), pp. 49–68.

=== Journals ===
- Đukić, Vesna (2019). "Od prirode i kulture do ekokulturnog turizma: studija Parka prirode "Ponjavica" (Pančevo)" [From nature and culture to ecocultural tourism: A study of The Ponjavica Nature Park (Pančevo)]. LIMESplus (in Serbian) (1–2): 95–108.
- Kljajić, Nataša; Vuković, Predrag; Roljević, Svetlana (2011). "Hydrological, soil and microclimate potential on the territory of Pančevo in function of agricultural production". Economics of Agriculture. 58 (3): 503–524. doi:10.22004/ag.econ.245077.
- Koneski, Nikola (2023). "Trgovačka akademija u Pančevu" [Trade Academy in Pančevo]. Acta Pannonica: Časopis za istoriju, društvene i humanističke nauke (in Serbian) (4): 5–39.
- Lukić, Vesna (2009). "Correlation Between Commuting and Migration in Daily Urban System of Pančevo (Vojvodina, Serbia)". Geographica Pannonica. 13 (1): 17–21.
- Nikolić, Vladan; Milinković, Sanjin; Vesković, Slavko; Pavlica, Dušan (2020). "Regionalni putnički saobraćaj – iskustva iz Južnog Banata" [Regional passenger traffic - experiences from South Banat]. Železnice (in Serbian). 2019 (2): 115–125.
- Živanović, Vedran (2017). "Environmental changes in the city of Pančevo". Zbornik radova - Geografski fakultet Univerziteta u Beogradu (65-1a): 449–462. doi:10.5937/zrgfub1765449Z.
