= ŽFK Pančevo =

- Full name: Ženski Fudbalski Klub Pančevo
- Founded: 2007
- Ground: SC Mladost, Pančevo
- Capacity: 9,869
- Chairman: (Serbia) Aleksandar Džakula
- Manager: (Serbia) Miodrag Kotlaja
- League: Druga Liga Srbije Sever
- 2007-2008: 6th
Home colours	Away colours

ŽFK Pančevo (Serbian Cyrillic: ЖФК Пaнчeвo) is a women's football club based in Pančevo, Serbia. They currently play in the northern section of the second division in Serbia, the Druga Liga Srbije Sever.

== Current squad ==
Andjelija Ilić
Milica Broš
Marija Zelenović
Ivana Đurkin
Nataša Petrić
Biljana Perošević
Bojana Cvijić
Dajana Mitić
Milana Spiridonov
Natalija Sipić
Branka Lazarević
Negica Ilić
Daliborka Dupalo
Sanja Pavlović
Tijana Minoski
Natalija Đurovski
Željana Milošević
Marina Bošnjak
Milena Radović
