= HIP-Azotara =

Serbian fertilizer company

- Official logo
- Native name: ХИП-Азотара
- Type: d.o.o.
- Industry: Chemicals
- Predecessor: Hemijska Industrija Pančevo (HIP)
- Founded: 8 July 1975; 51 years ago
- Headquarters: Pančevo, Serbia
- Key people: Danilo Tomašević (Director)
- Products: Mineral fertilizer, nitrogen compounds
- Revenue: ▲€59.10 million (2022)
- Net income: ▲€10.02 million (2022)
- Total assets: ▲€168.31 million (2022)
- Total equity: ▲€124.42 million (2022)
- Owner: Promist d.o.o. (100%)
- Number of employees: 209 (2022)
- Website: azotara.com

HIP–Azotara (Serbian: ХИП-Азотара), or simply Azotara, is a Serbian mineral fertilizer and nitrogen compounds company, with the headquarters in Pančevo, Serbia. It was founded in 1975.

== History ==
In 1962, a Yugoslav industrial giant - "Hemijska Industrija Pančevo" (eng. Chemical Industry of Pančevo") was founded with headquarters in Pančevo. In 1975, it was split into two companies which are in close proximity - HIP-Azotara (for mineral fertilizers) and HIP-Petrohemija (for petrochemicals). HIP-Petrohemija was built on the success of HIP-Azotara, and only by 1990, the companies were completely separated. HIP-Azotara never claimed its share in the ownership of HIP-Petrohemija, as both were in the state-ownership. In 1999, the company facilities were targeted and bombed during the NATO bombing of Yugoslavia; estimates are that around 250 tons of liquid ammonia had leaked into the ground and the waste water channel as a result.

=== 2006–2009 ===
In April 2006, HIP-Azotara was privatized and sold to the Lithuanian-Serbian consortium (Arvi & Co, Sanitex, and Univerzal-holding) for 13.1 million euros.

=== 2009–2021: Srbijagas takeover ===
The 2006 privatization was cancelled in January 2009, and 55 million euros of debt was converted to the ownership shares, with the Serbian state-owned gas company Srbijagas set to become the majority stakeholder with 81.6% of shares. In April 2012, it was announced that 130 million euros of debt was written off. In March 2013, Srbijagas formally took over the company. From September 2018 until May 2021, the HIP-Azotara was in bankruptcy procedure.

=== 2021–present: Promist ===
In May 2021, it was sold to the Novi Sad-based company Promist for 650 million dinars. In May 2022, it was announced that there are plans for the creation of facility for blue hydrogen production in the future in HIP-Azotara.

== See also ==
- Agriculture in Serbia
