= HIP-Petrohemija =

Serbian petrochemical company

- Native name: ХИП-Петрохемија
- Company type: d.o.o.
- Industry: Chemicals
- Predecessor: Hemijska Industrija Pančevo (HIP)
- Founded: 8 July 1975; 50 years ago First founded 1968
- Headquarters: Spoljnostarčevačka 82, Pančevo, Serbia
- Key people: Goran Stojilković (Director)
- Products: Petrochemicals
- Revenue: ▼€264.50 million (2023)
- Net income: ▼ (€156.25 million) (2023)
- Total assets: ▼€261.85 million (2023)
- Total equity: ▼€194.30 million (2023)
- Owner: NIS (90.00%); Government of Serbia (10.00%)
- Number of employees: 1,243 (2023)
- Website: www.hip-petrohemija.com

HIP–Petrohemija (Serbian: ХИП-Петрохемија), or simply Petrohemija, is a Serbian petrochemical company, with the headquarters in Pančevo, Serbia. It is majority owned by NIS.

The company owns petrochemical complexes located in Pančevo, Elemir and Crepaja. It specializes in producing HDPE, LDPE and other petrochemical products with an annual production capacity of 700,000 tonnes.

== History ==
In 1962, a Yugoslav industrial giant – "Hemijska Industrija Pančevo" (eng. Chemical Industry of Pančevo") – was founded with headquarters in Pančevo. In 1968, HIP-Petrohemija (for petrochemicals) was split from the company and in 1975 HIP-Azotara (for mineral fertilizers) was separated from the original company.

HIP-Petrohemija was built on the success of HIP-Azotara, and only by 1990, the companies were completely separated. HIP-Azotara never claimed its share in the ownership of HIP-Petrohemija, as both were in the state-ownership.

Due to the international sanctions against the Federal Republic of Yugoslavia, the production in HIP-Petrohemija completely stopped. In 1996, the company facilities started production once again.

In 1999, the company facilities were targeted and bombed during the NATO bombing of Yugoslavia; estimates are that around 460 tons of highly toxic vinyl chloride leaked into the environment as a result.

=== 2004–2021 ===
In 2004, HIP-Petrohemija became a joint-stock company after conversion of debts. In May 2009, HIP-Petrohemija went into the restructuring process; although being one of the largest exporters of Serbia, it posted net loss consistently since 2004.

In June 2014, it was estimated that HIP-Petrohemija has debt of 265 million euros to the Serbian oil company Naftna Industrija Srbije (NIS), and together with debt to the Serbian state-owned gas company Srbijagas owes more than half a billion euros. At the time, the indebted HIP-Petrohemija had 1,760 employees. From 2016 to 2018, Srbijagas has recapitalized HIP-Petrohemija.

In August 2017, debts of HIP-Petrohemija were converted into shares, with the Government of Serbia being the majority shareholder with 76% of shares, and NIS and Lukoil Serbia being the minority shareholders.

=== Since 2021: NIS takover ===
On 24 December 2021, NIS increased its stake in HIP-Petrohemija to 90% of shares, after purchasing the majority of stakes from the Government of Serbia for 150 million euros. The sale was finished in June 2023, after the European Commission approved it in September 2022. In early December 2025, HIP-Petrohemija had to halt production at its refinery due to U.S. sanctions affecting Gazprom-majority-owned NIS, causing an oil shortage. The U.S. Office of Foreign Assets Control granted NIS a temporary operating license on December 31, 2025, under the condition that Gazprom would sell its shares in NIS.

== Activity ==
HIP Petrohemija owns large petrochemical complexes located in Pančevo, Elemir and Crepaja. These complexes include a number of nine producing plants.

The ethylene plant is located in Pančevo and was established in 1979 and built by United States–based company Stone & Webster and French company French Institute of Petroleum. It produces ethylene, propylene, synthetic rubber, latex, carbon black and gasoline and has an annual production capacity of around 500,000 tonnes. The high-density polyethylene (HDPE) plant is located in Pančevo and was established in 1975 under licence from the former United States–based Phillips Petroleum Company. The plant has two production lines and produces high-density polyethylene or HDPE having an annual capacity of 76,000 tonnes. The low-density polyethylene (HDPE) plant is located in Pančevo and was established in 1979 under licence from the former United States–based National Distillers. The plant has one production line and produces low-density polyethylene or LDPE having an annual capacity of 57,000 tonnes.

The synthetic rubber plant is located in Elemir and was established in 1983 under licence from the former Germany based Buna-Werke Hulls. The plant has three production units and produces synthetic rubber having an annual capacity of 40,000 tonnes, 1,3-Butadiene under licence from Japanese company Nippon Zeon having an annual production capacity of 45,000 tonnes and methyl tert-butyl ether or MTBE under licence from Italian company Snamprogetti having an annual production capacity of 35,000 tonnes. Other production plants include the PVC production plant in Crepaja with an annual capacity of 16,000 tonnes, the polyethylene pipes and fittings plant in Pančevo with an annual capacity of 11,000 tonnes, the chlorine-alkali electrolysis plant in Pančevo built under the licence of the Olin Corporation with an annual capacity of 200,000 tonnes, a water treatment plant in Pančevo and a utility plant that produces energy fluids.

== Market and financial data ==
In 2017, after years of insolvency, HIP-Petrohemija made record 341.48 million euros of net profit. This tremendous trend turnover was achieved through debt write off and debt-to-shares conversion by the Government of Serbia. In 2024, HIP-Petrohemija reported a loss of RSD7.7 billion, which increased to RSD10.3 billion in 2025.
