= Vojlovica Monastery =

Monastery in Serbia

Coordinates: 44°49′54″N 20°41′59″E

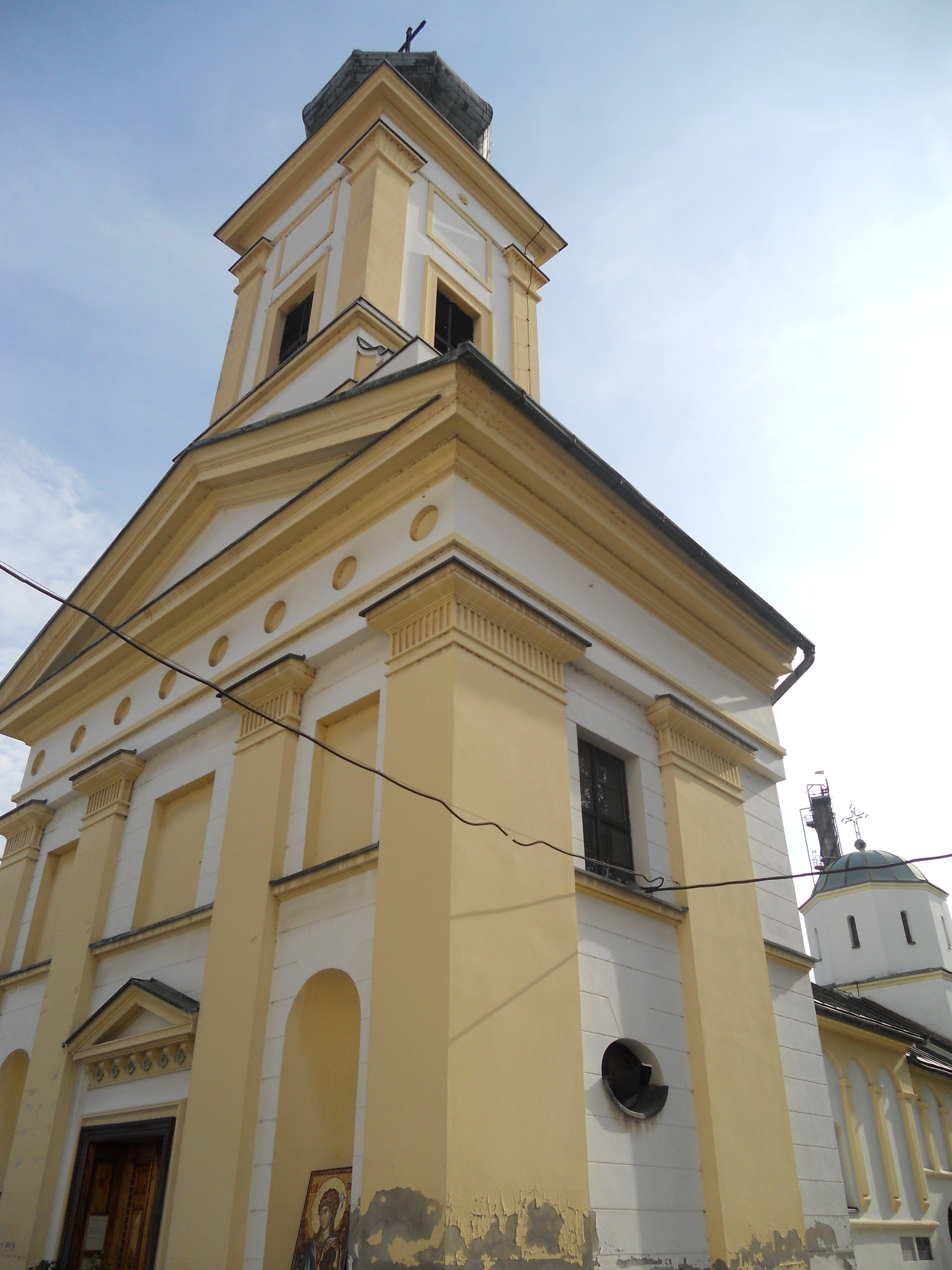
Vojlovica Monastery

The Vojlovica Monastery (Serbian: Манастир Војловица, romanized: Manastir Vojlovica) is a Serb Orthodox monastery situated in the Banat region, in the northern Serbian province of Vojvodina. It is in the Pančevo municipality. It was founded during the time of Despot Stefan Lazarević (1374-1427).

Vojlovica Monastery was declared Monument of Culture of Exceptional Importance in 1990, and it is protected by the state.

== See also ==
- List of Serb Orthodox monasteries
