= Đura Džudžar =

Serbian bishop

- Eparch of Ruski Krstur
- Native name: Ђура Џуџар
- Church: Greek Catholic Church in Croatia and Serbia
- Diocese: Eparchy of Ruski Krstur
- Appointed: 28 August 2003
- Predecessor: Apostolic Exarchate established
- Previous posts: Titular Eparch of Acarassus (2001-2018); Auxiliary Eparch of Mukachevo (2001-2003)

Orders
- Ordination: 7 September 1980 by Gabrijel Bukatko
- Consecration: 19 March 2001 by Pope John Paul II

Personal details
- Born: 22 April 1954 (age 72) Đurđevo, Autonomous Province of Vojvodina, People's Republic of Serbia, Federal People's Republic of Yugoslavia
- Coat of arms

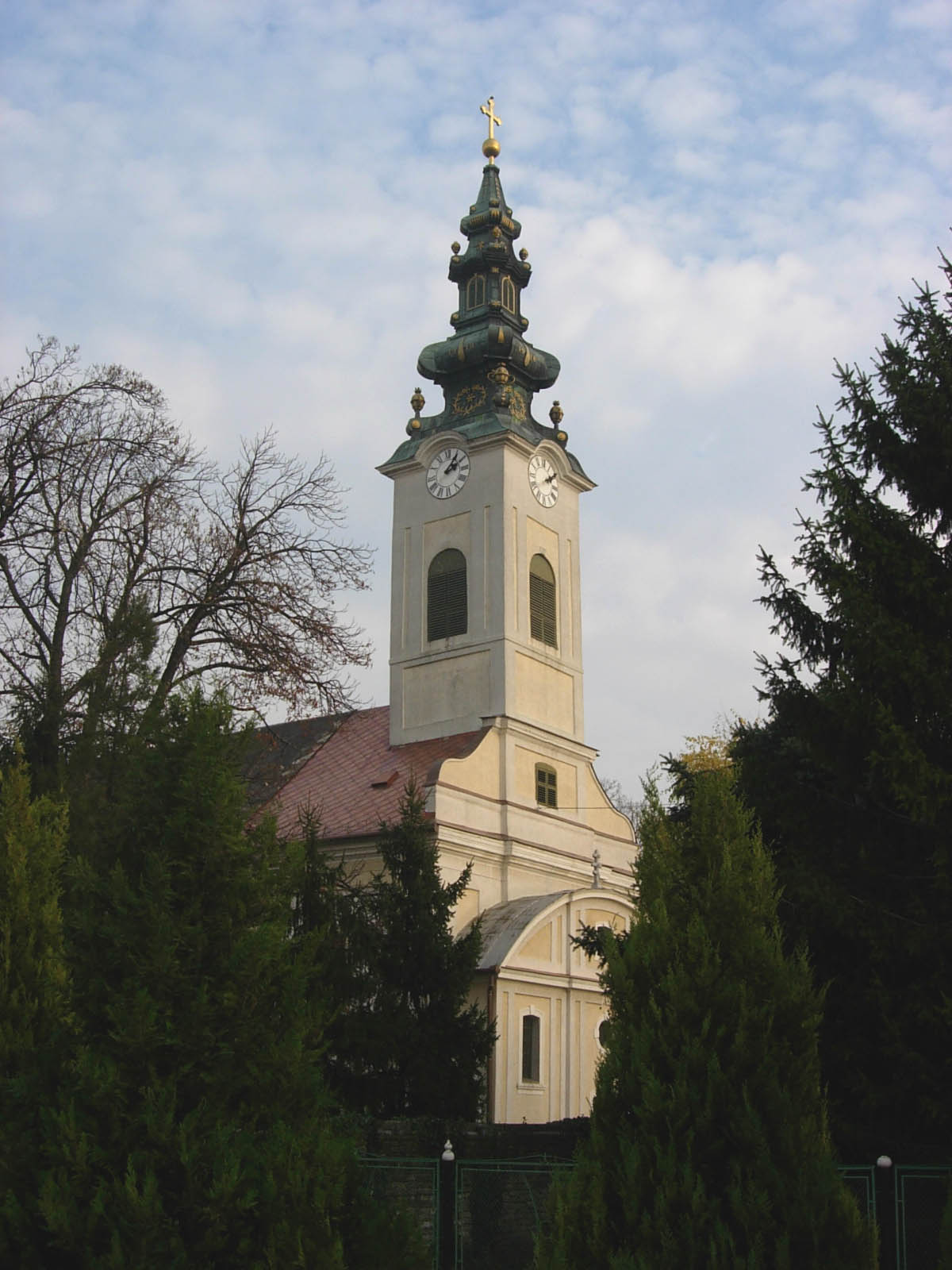
Byzantine Catholic Cathedral of St. Nicholas in Ruski Krstur, Serbia

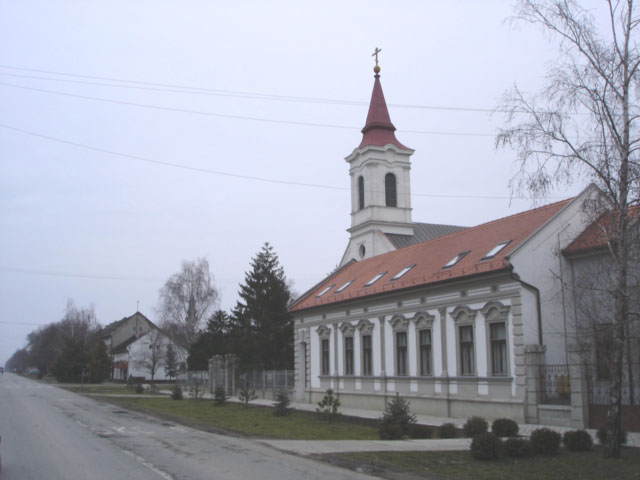
Byzantine Catholic Church in Đurđevo (Serbia), hometown of Bishop Đura Džudžar

Đura Džudžar (born 22 April 1954) is a Serbian eparchial bishop of the Greek Catholic Eparchy of Ruski Krstur since 2018. He was previously titular bishop of Acrassus (2001-2018), auxiliary bishop of the Ruthenian Eparchy of Mukachevo (2001-2003), apostolic exarch of Serbia and Montenegro (2003-2013) and Serbia (2013-2018).

== Biography ==
Đura Džudžar was born in Đurđevo, Serbia to father Vladimir and mother Natalia. He completed elementary education in his home town and then continued higher education in Rome in a Ukrainian Papal Minor Seminary. He was ordained on 7 September 1980 in the Greek Catholic Eparchy of Križevci by Gabrijel Bukatko, former Roman Catholic Archbishop of Belgrade, who was in that time apostolic administrator in Križevci. After returning to Rome, Đura Džudžar served in Congregation for the Oriental Churches.

On 3 March 2001 he was appointed auxiliary bishop of the Ruthenian Eparchy of Mukachevo by Pope John Paul II. In the same time, he was appointed as titular bishop of Acrassus and received episcopal ordination from Pope John Paul II on 19 March 2001, being co-consecrators the curial cardinals Angelo Sodano and Giovanni Battista Re.

In 2003, a new apostolic exarchate was created for Eastern Catholics of Byzantine Rite in Serbia and Montenegro, the Greek Catholic Apostolic Exarchate of Serbia and Montenegro. Its first exarch was bishop Đura Džudžar, who was appointed on 28 August 2003, with residence in Ruski Krstur. This exarchate remained in association with the Greek Catholic Eparchy of Križevci, as part of the Greek Catholic Church of Croatia and Serbia.

On 19 January 2013, all Eastern Catholics of the Byzantine Rite in Montenegro were entrusted to the local Latin bishops, so the jurisdiction of the Apostolic Exarchate of Serbia and Montenegro was reduced to Serbia only.

In 2018, the Apostolic Exarchate of Serbia was elevated to the rank of eparchy, becoming the Greek Catholic Eparchy of Saint Nicholas of Ruski Krstur. The new eparchy is still associated with the Eparchy of Križevci as part of the Greek Catholic Church of Croatia and Serbia.
