= Greek Catholic Eparchy of Ruski Krstur =

Greek Catholic eparchy in Serbia

Greek Catholic Eparchy of Ruski Krstur Eparchia de Ruski Krstur Керстурска ґрекокатолїцка епархия Крстурска гркокатоличка епархија
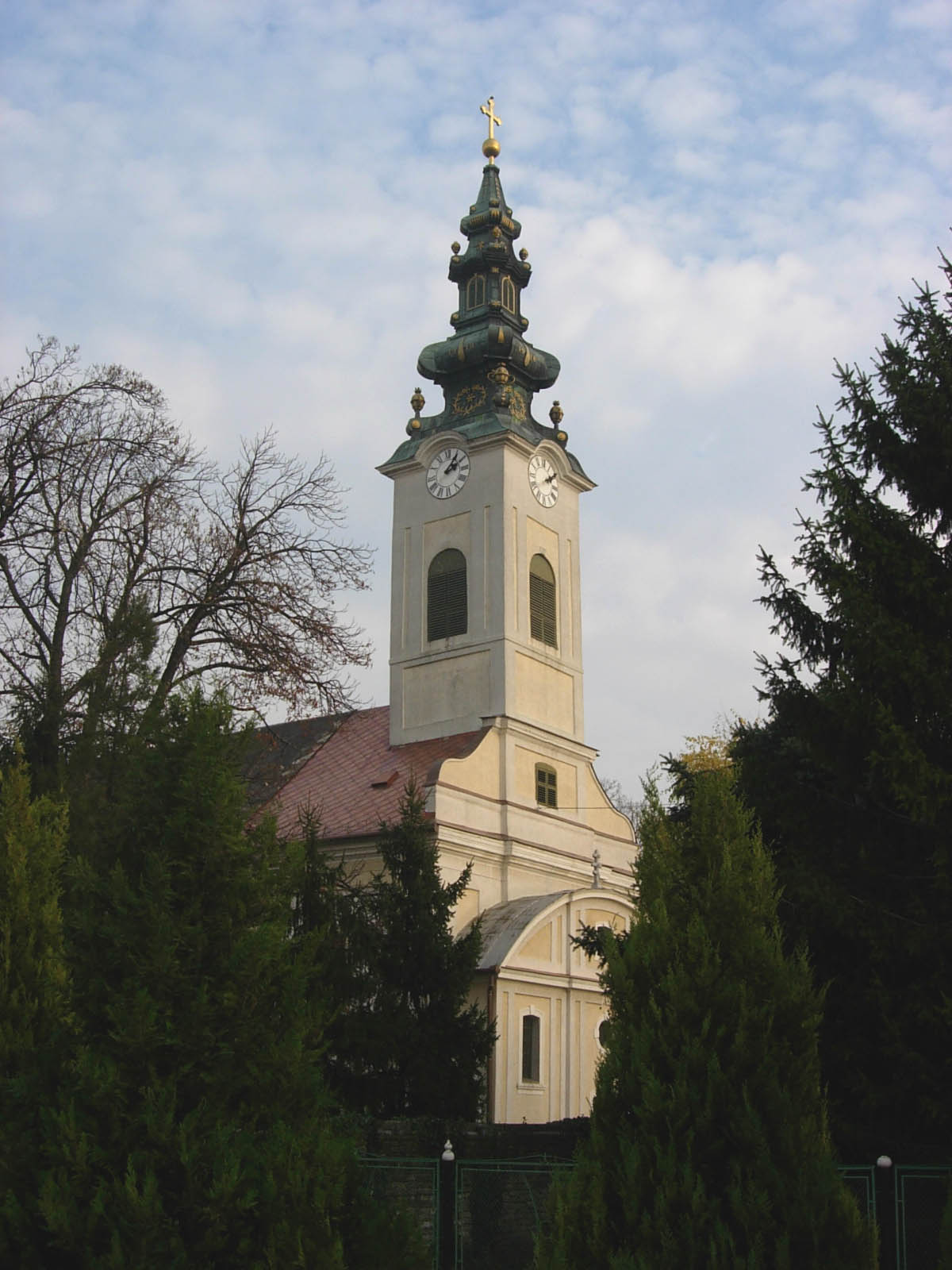
- Saint Nicholas Cathedral, Ruski Krstur

Location
- Country: Serbia
- Metropolitan: Exempt directly to the Holy See

Statistics
- Parishes: 21

Information
- Denomination: Catholic Church
- Sui iuris church: Greek Catholic Church of Croatia and Serbia
- Rite: Byzantine Rite
- Established: 2018
- Cathedral: Saint Nicholas Cathedral, Ruski Krstur
- Patron saint: Saint Nicholas
- Secular priests: 21

Current leadership
- Pope: Leo XIV
- Bishop: Đura Džudžar

Website
- svnikolaj.rs

The Greek Catholic Eparchy of Ruski Krstur (Serbian: Крстурска гркокатоличка епархија, romanized: Krsturska grkokatolička eparhija), officially known as Greek Catholic Eparchy of Saint Nicholas in Ruski Krstur (Serbian: Гркокатоличка епархија Светог Николе у Руском Крстуру, romanized: Grkokatolička eparhija Svetog Nikole u Ruskom Krsturu), is a Greek Catholic Church in Croatia and Serbia ecclesiastical territory or eparchy covering Serbia and mostly serving ethnic Rusyns in the region of Bačka. It practices liturgy in the Slavonic form of Byzantine Rite and uses the Old Church Slavonic language and the Cyrillic alphabet.

The Eparchy of Ruski Krstur is one of two eparchies for the Greek Catholic Church of Croatia and Serbia, together with the Greek Catholic Eparchy of Križevci in Croatia. The Eparchy of Ruski Krstur is exempt directly to the Holy See. The Eparchy of Križevci is a suffragan of the Roman Catholic Archdiocese of Zagreb.

== History ==
Until 2001, the Greek Catholic Eparchy of Križevci had full jurisdiction over all Greek Catholics throughout the territory of the former Yugoslavia, including all of its successor states: Croatia, Slovenia, Bosnia-Herzegovina, Serbia, Montenegro, and North Macedonia.

After the formation of independent successor states from what had been Yugoslavia, the process of administrative reorganization was initiated. In 2001, the separate Byzantine Catholic Apostolic Exarchate of Macedonia was formed for Greek Catholics in North Macedonia and directly subjected to the Holy See.

In 2003, a new apostolic exarchate was created for Greek Catholics in Serbia and Montenegro, the Apostolic Exarchate of Serbia and Montenegro. Its first and only exarch was Bishop Đura Džudžar, with episcopal see in Ruski Krstur. This exarchate remained in association with the Eparchy of Križevci.

In 2004, the Apostolic Exarchate for Serbia and Montenegro had 26 parishes with 22,934 faithful and 18 priests, and in 2009 it had 21 parishes with 22,369 faithful and 18 priests.

In 2013, all Greek Catholics in Montenegro were entrusted to the local Roman Catholic bishops, so the jurisdiction of the Apostolic Exarchate of Serbia and Montenegro was reduced to Serbia. Bishop Đura Džudžar remained in his post as exarch and the Apostolic Exarchate of Serbia was still associated with the Greek Catholic Eparchy of Križevci as part of the Greek Catholic Church of Croatia and Serbia. In 2016, the Apostolic Exarchate for Serbia had 21 parishes with 21,845 faithful and 21 priests.

In 2018, the Apostolic Exarchate of Serbia was elevated by Pope Francis to the rank of Eparchy and Đura Džudžar was appointed the first eparchial bishop.

== Gallery ==
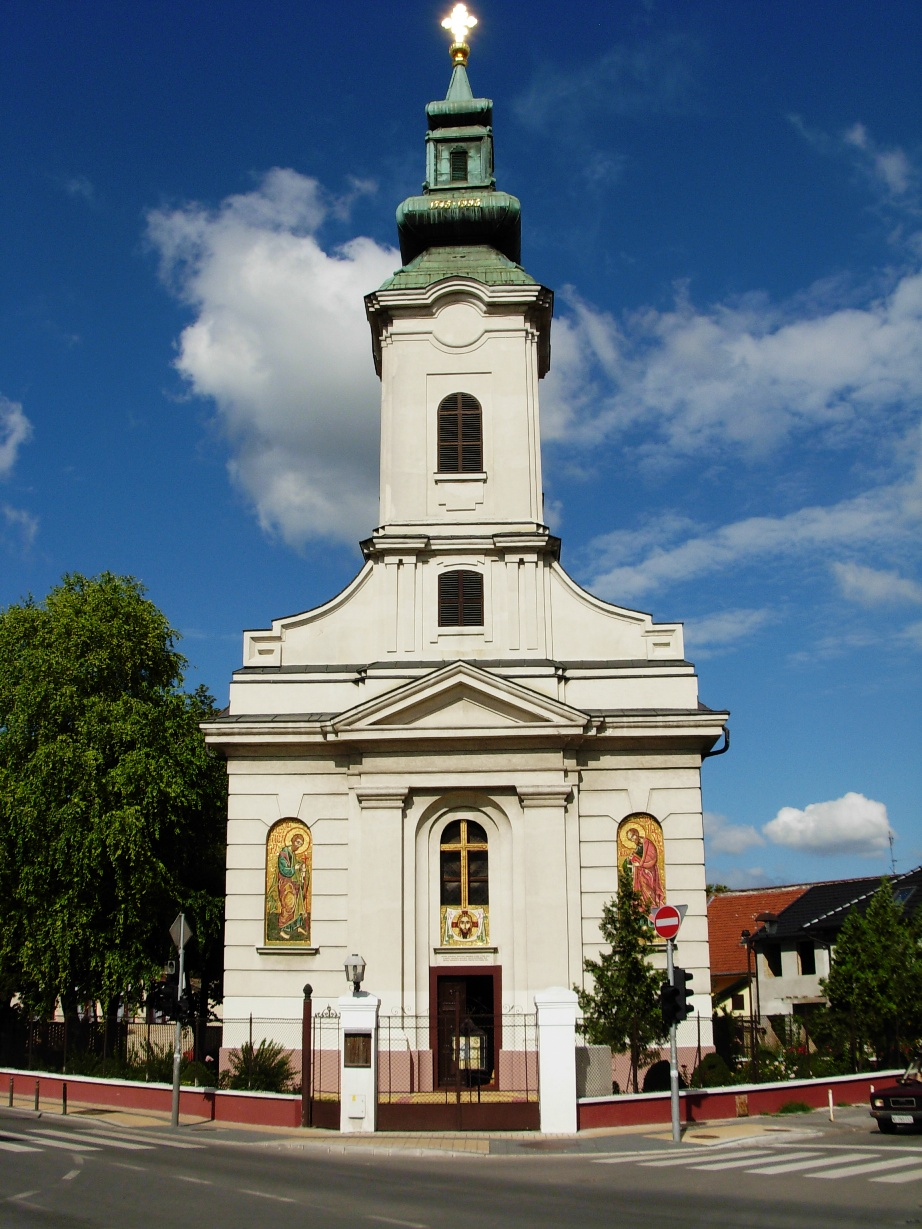
Church of Sts. Peter and Paul in Novi Sad

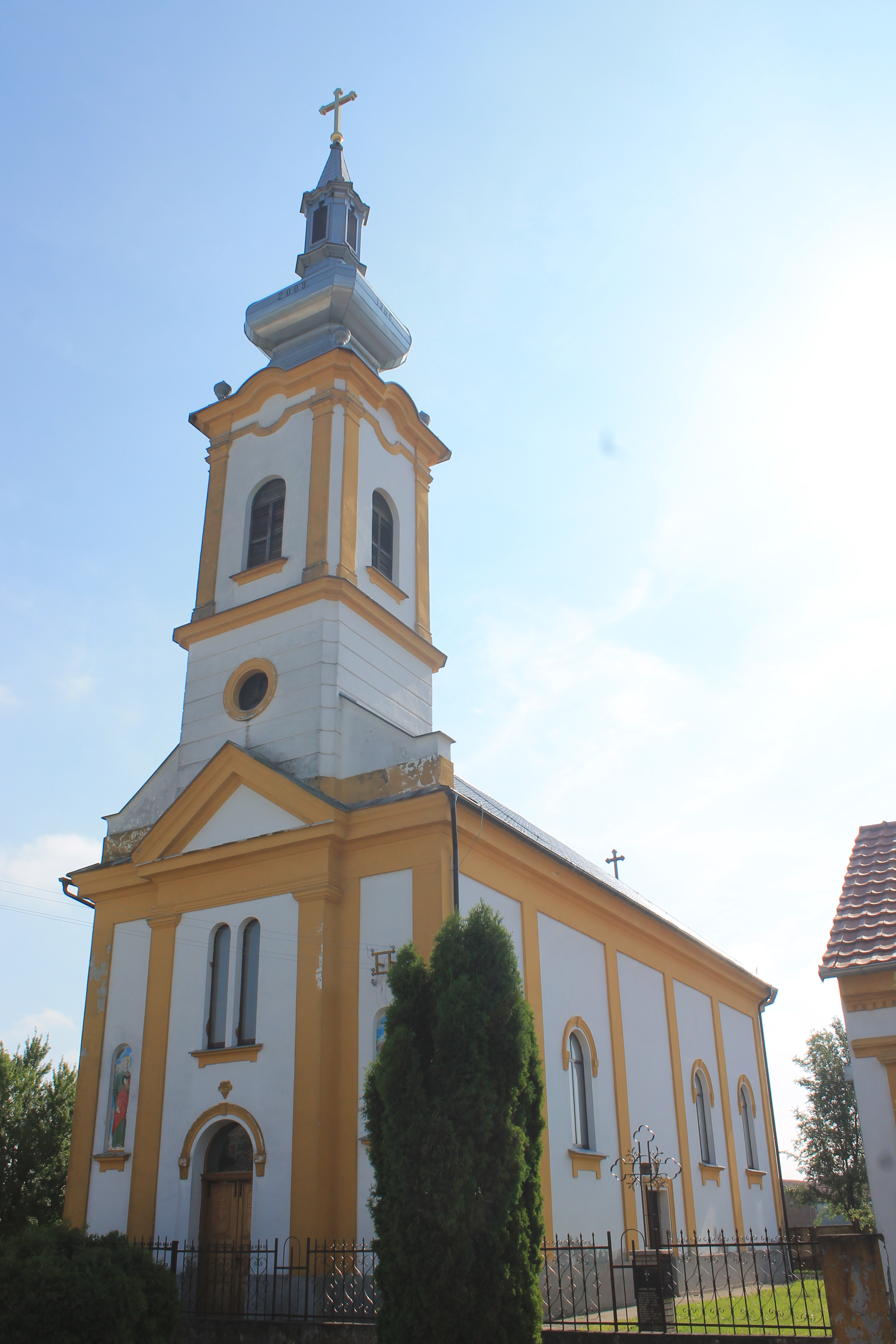
Church of St. Luke in Bačinci

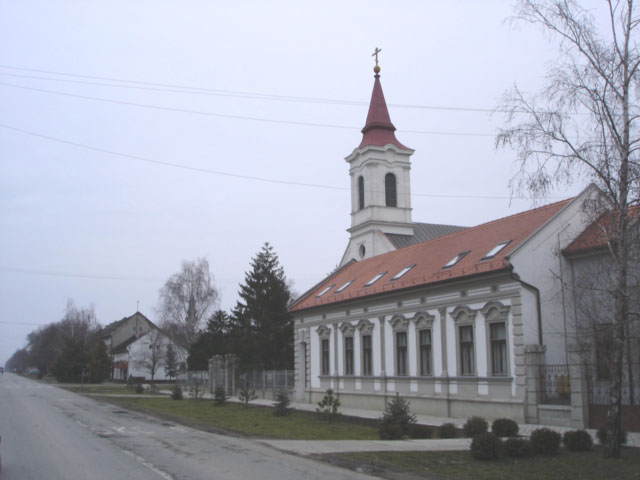
Church in Đurđevo

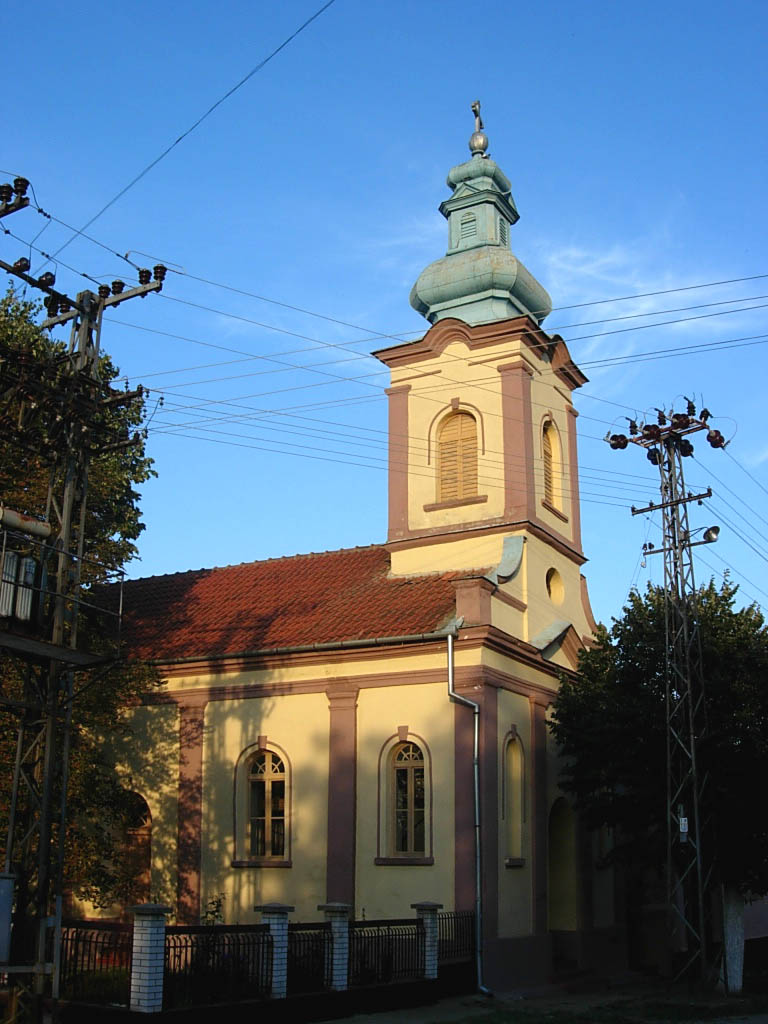
Church in Markovac

== See also ==
- Catholic Church in Serbia
