= Habsburg Slavonia =

Habsburg Slavonia may refer to:

- in the 16th and 17th century: western part of the historical Slavonia, encompassing counties of Zagreb and Varaždin, and some parts of the old Križevci County, that remained under Habsburg rule after Ottoman invasion of eastern Slavonian regions
- in the 18th century and up to 1867: Kingdom of Slavonia, a crown land of the Habsburg Monarchy and the Austrian Empire
- Kingdom of Croatia and Slavonia, a crown land of the Austro-Hungarian Empire (1867-1918)

== See also ==
- Slavonia (disambiguation)
