= Acrassus =

Ancient city

Acrassus or Akrassos (Ancient Greek: Ἄκρασος) was an ancient Roman and Byzantine-era city in Lydia (modern Turkey). in the Roman province of Asia and Lydia. Apparently, it is the same place that Ptolemy calls Nacrasa or Nakrasa (Ancient Greek: Νάκρασα), placed on the road from Thyatira to Pergamum.

It was in the upper valley of the Caicus (today Bakırçay) River, at or near İlyaslar, but its exact site is not located.

Acrassus minted its own coins.

== Bishopric ==
Acrassus was also the seat of a bishopric and remains a titular diocese of the Roman Catholic Church in the ecclesiastical province of Sardis. It is named after the ancient city and the current bishop is Đura Džudžar.

=== Known bishops ===
- Albert-Léon-Marie Le Nordez Auxiliary Bishop of Verdun (France) June 25, 1896 – November 28, 1898
- Leopoldo A. Arcaira Auxiliary Bishop of Zamboanga Auxiliary Bishop of Malolos (Philippines) November 6, 1961 – November 23, 1994
- Đura Džudžar, auxiliary bishop of the Greek Catholic Eparchy of Mukachevo (3 March 2001), Exarch of the Greek Catholic Apostolic Exarchate of Serbia and Montenegro (23 August 2003), Exarch of the Greek Catholic Apostolic Exarchate of Serbia (19 January 2013), later Eparch of the Greek Catholic Eparchy of Ruski Krstur (6 Décember 2018).
