= Greek Catholics in Montenegro =

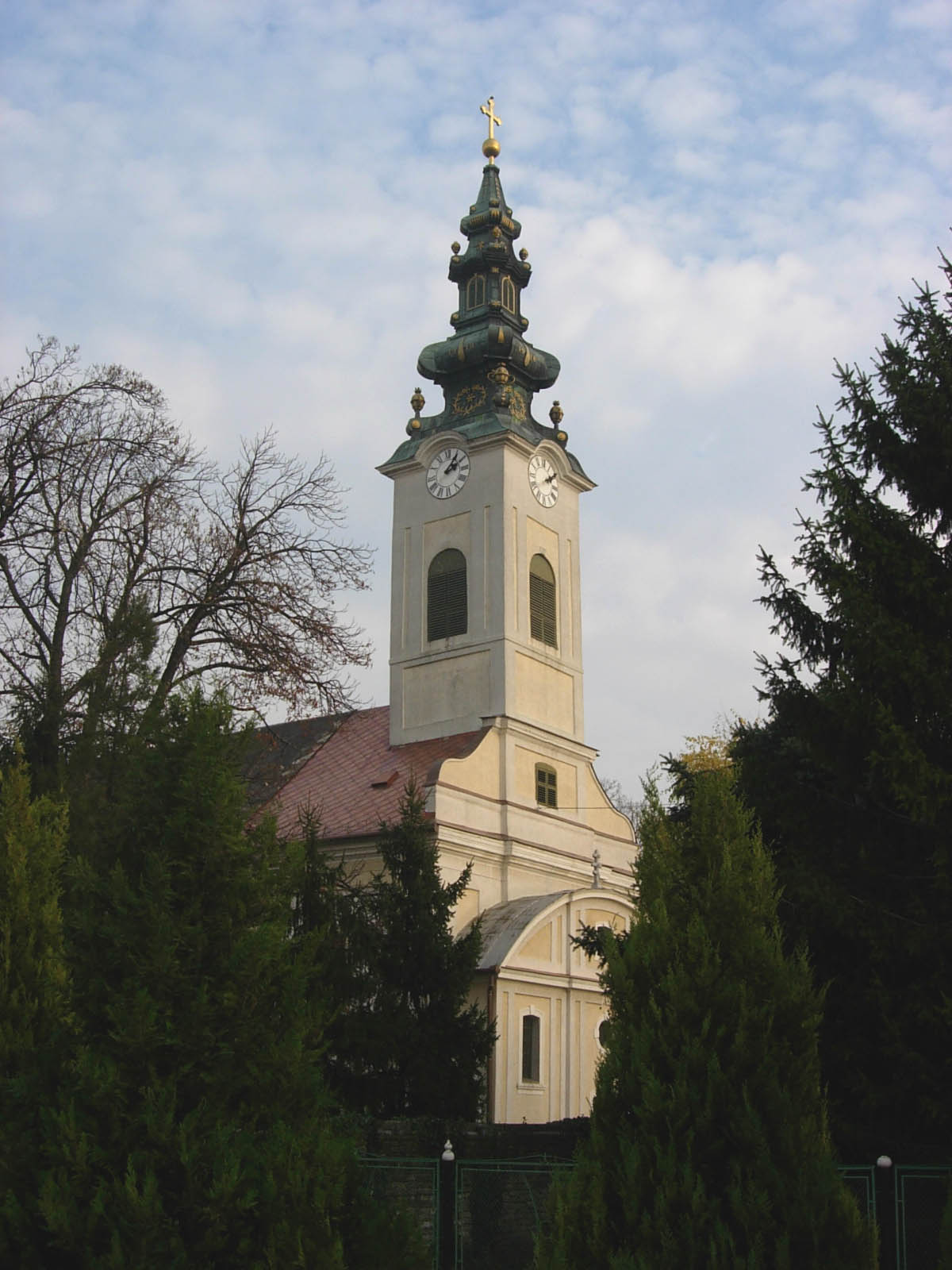
Greek Catholic Church of St. Nicholas in Ruski Krstur in Serbia - Cathedral Church of the former Greek Catholic Apostolic Exarchate of Serbia and Montenegro (2003-2013)

Greek Catholics in Montenegro are Eastern Catholic Christians who are practicing liturgy in the Byzantine Rite. Since 2013, there is no longer any Eastern Catholic jurisdictions covering Montenegro, and all Byzantine Rite Catholics in the country are under jurisdiction of local bishops of the Latin Church.

== History ==
Before 2013, Montenegro was part of the jurisdiction of the Greek Catholic Church of Croatia and Serbia, first in the territory of the Greek Catholic Eparchy of Križevci (est. 1777), seated in Croatia, and then of the Greek Catholic Apostolic Exarchate of Serbia and Montenegro (2003-2013). The Apostolic Exarchate, seated in Ruski Krstur, in northern Serbia, had 21 parishes and 22,720 faithful, consisting mostly of a Pannonian Rusyns in the region of Vojvodina. The Apostolic Exarchate of Serbia and Montenegro practiced liturgy in the Slavic form of Byzantine Rite, using the Church Slavonic language and the Cyrillic alphabet.

In 2013, the territory of the exarchate was reduced to form the Apostolic exarchate of Serbia, elevated in 2018 to form the Greek Catholic Eparchy of Ruski Krstur. The few Greek Catholics of Montenegro have since been assigned to the pastoral care of the Latin Church clergy of the Catholic Church in Montenegro. There are 21,299 Catholics in Montenegro (3.5% of the population), which are almost entirely Latin Catholics.

== See also ==
- Roman Catholic Archdiocese of Bar
- Roman Catholic Diocese of Kotor
- Eastern Orthodoxy in Montenegro
