= Western Slavonia =

Western Slavonia may refer to:

- western part of the modern region of Slavonia, in Croatia
- western part of the medieval Banate of Slavonia
- western part of the early modern Kingdom of Slavonia
- shorthand for the former unrecognized entity SAO Western Slavonia

== See also ==
- Slavonia (disambiguation)
- Eastern Slavonia (disambiguation)
