= Saint Nicholas Cathedral, Ruski Krstur =

Saint Nicholas Cathedral
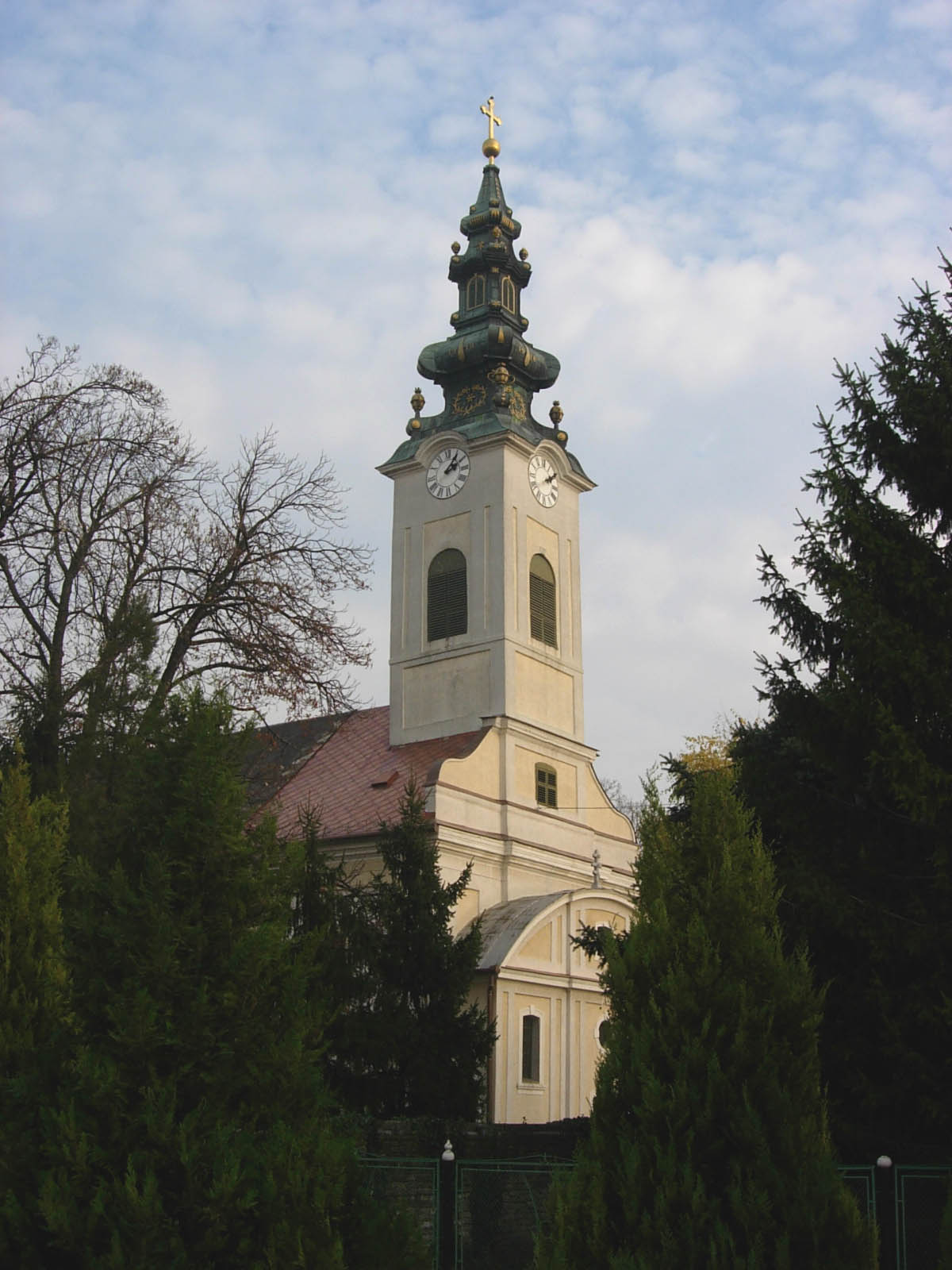
- Saint Nicholas Cathedral
- 45°33′43″N 19°24′57″E
- Location: Ruski Krstur
- Country: Serbia
- Denomination: Greek Catholic Church in Croatia and Serbia

Administration
- Diocese: Greek Catholic Eparchy of Ruski Krstur

The Saint Nicholas Cathedral (Pannonian Rusyn: Катедрална церква св. Миколая; Serbian: Гркокатоличка саборна црква Светог Николе), also known as the Ruski Krstur Cathedral, is an Eastern Catholic church located in Ruski Krstur, Kula, Serbia. It is under jurisdiction of the Greek Catholic Eparchy of Ruski Krstur of the Greek Catholic Church in Croatia and Serbia and serves as its cathedral church. The church was elevated in cathedral in 2003, simultaneously with the creation of the Apostolic Exarchate for Catholics of Byzantine rite of Serbia under the pontificate of Pope John Paul II.

The present building was built in 1784 but underwent a reconstruction in 1836, as evidenced by the inscription on the north portal. Between 1961 and 1963 there was the complete restoration of the iconostasis. Some restoration works were carried out in 1972.

== Gallery ==
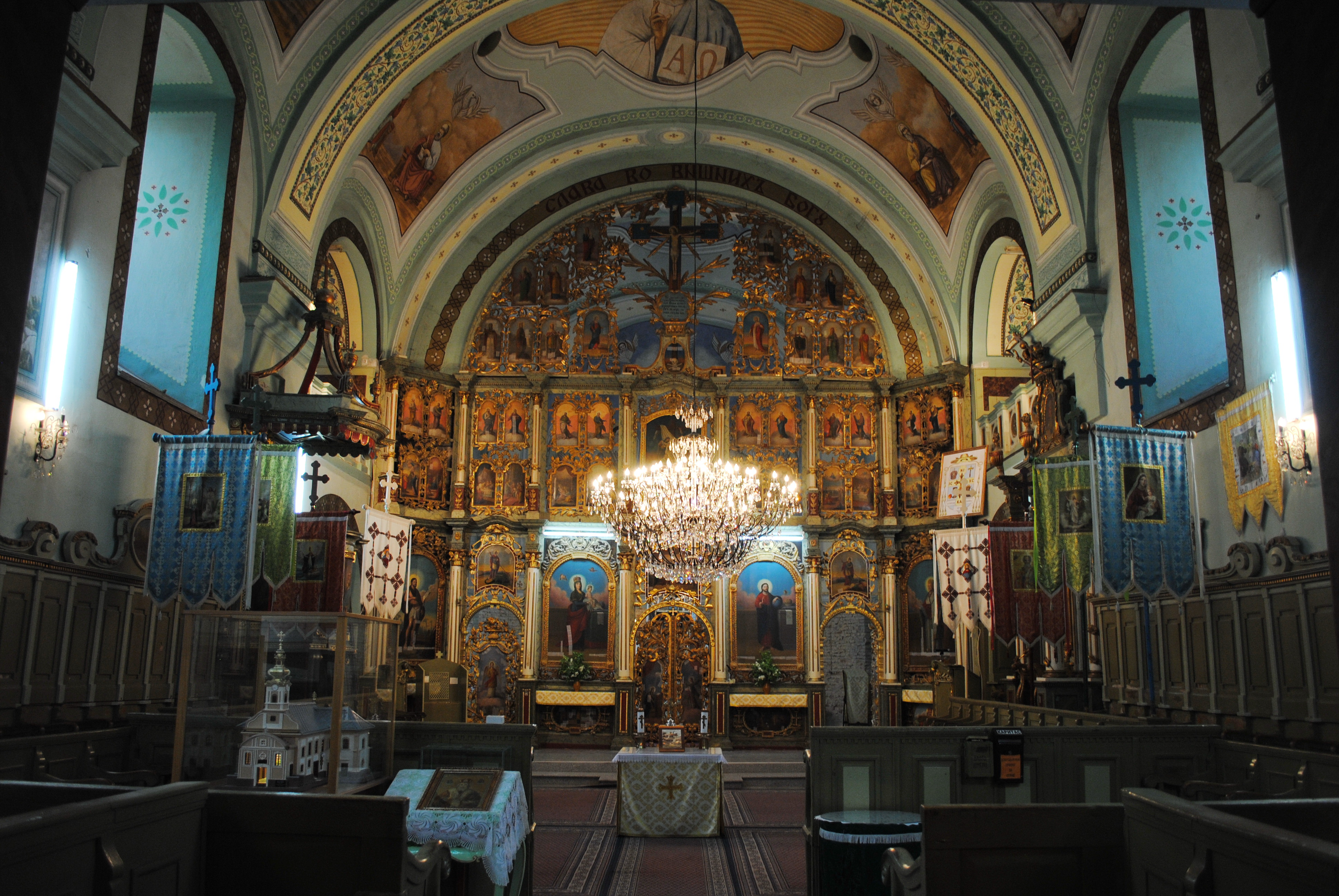
Interior

== See also ==
- List of cathedrals in Serbia
- Church of St. Luke, Bačinci
