= SS Slavonia =

A number of steamships have been named Slavonia, including –

- RMS Slavonia, a Cunard Line passenger ship in service 1903–09
- SS Slavonia (1883), a Hamburg Amerika Line passenger ship in service 1886–97
- SS Slavonia (1900), a Hamburg Amerika Line ship in service 1904–19

== See also ==
- Slavonia (disambiguation)
