= Church of St. Luke, Bačinci =

Coordinates: 45°05′01″N 19°18′32″E

Church of St. Luke
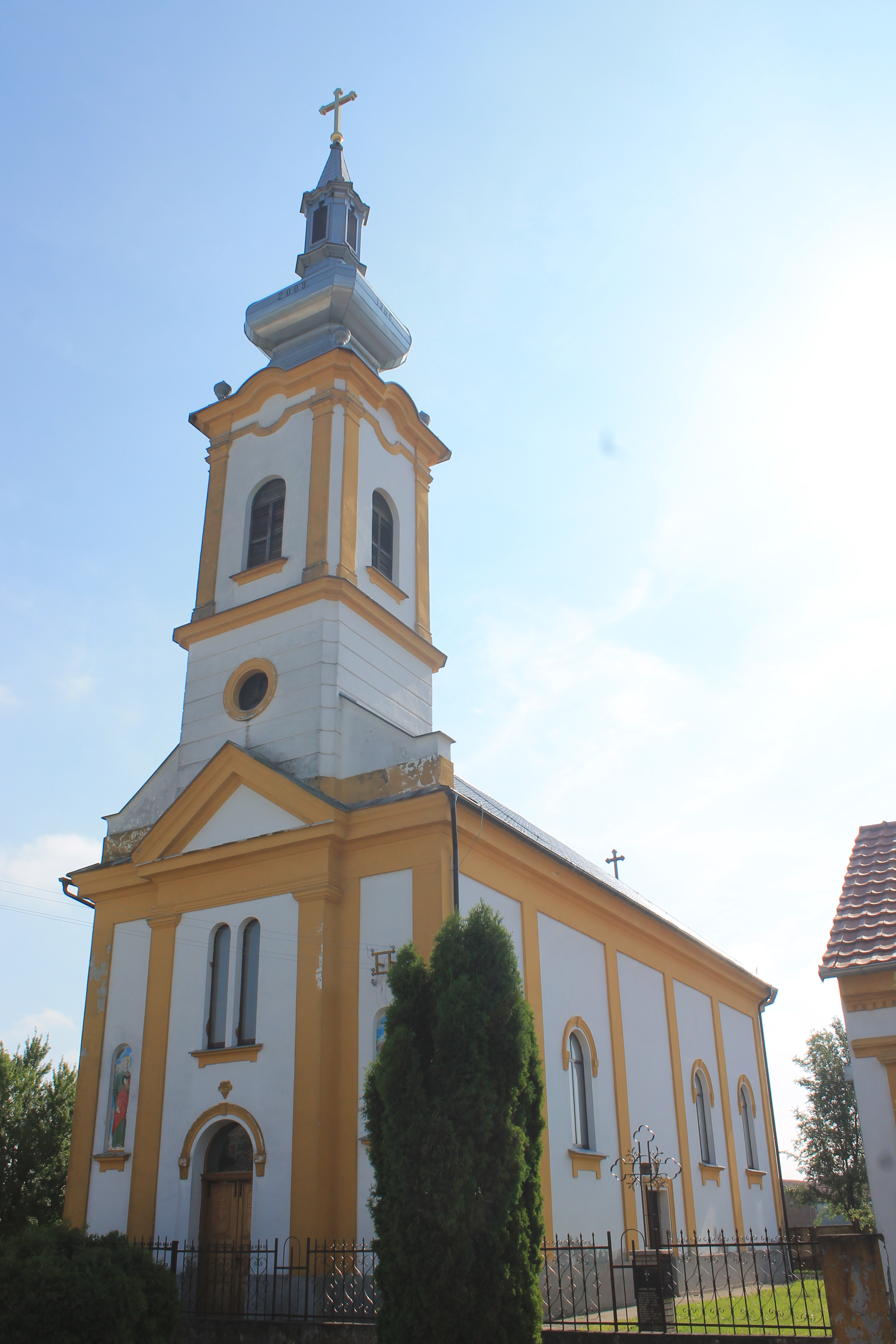
- Church of St. Luke
- Church of St. Luke
- Location: Bačinci, Vojvodina
- Country: Serbia
- Denomination: Greek Catholic Church in Croatia and Serbia

History
- Status: Church
- Dedication: Luke the Evangelist

Architecture
- Functional status: Active
- Years built: 1905

The Church of St. Luke (Serbian: Црква Светог Луке, Pannonian Rusyn: Церква Святого Луки) in Bačinci, Serbia, is a Greek Catholic parish church belonging to the Greek Catholic Church in Croatia and Serbia. The Greek Catholic parish, which primarily serves the Pannonian Rusyns community, was established in 1850, while the present church building was constructed in 1905. The parish in Bačinci is part of the Greek Catholic Eparchy of Ruski Krstur. Alongside Serbian Orthodox Church of St. Nicholas, the church is one of the main landmarks and historical monuments of the village.

== History ==
The Greek Catholic parish in Bačinci was formed in the 19th century by Pannonian Rusyn settlers who migrated from the Bačka region, particularly from the settlements of Ruski Krstur and Kucura. The church building was damaged by storm in summer of 2023 during the 2023 European heatwaves.

== See also ==
- Saint Nicholas Cathedral, Ruski Krstur
