= Slavonian =

Slavonian may refer to:

- something of, or related to Slavonia
- Slavonian dialect, a Slavic dialect spoken in parts of Slavonia
- historical name used in some sources for the Serbo-Croatian pluricentric language in Slavonia

== See also ==
- Slavonia (disambiguation)
