= Eastern Slavonia =

Eastern Slavonia may refer to:

- eastern part of the modern region of Slavonia, alternatively called Croatian Podunavlje, in Croatia
- eastern part of the medieval Banate of Slavonia
- eastern part of the early modern Kingdom of Slavonia
- shorthand for the former unrecognized entity SAO Eastern Slavonia, Baranja and Western Syrmia
- shorthand for the transitional entity Eastern Slavonia, Baranja and Western Syrmia (1995–1998)
- shorthand for the United Nations Transitional Administration for Eastern Slavonia, Baranja and Western Sirmium (1996–1998)
- section of the region east of Osijek excluding Baranja and Syrmia (primarily Erdut, Trpinja and Borovo municipalities)

== See also ==
- Slavonia (disambiguation)
- Western Slavonia (disambiguation)
