= Slavonia (disambiguation) =

Slavonia may refer to:

- Slavonia, geographical and historical region in modern Croatia
- Banate of Slavonia, medieval province of the Kingdom of Hungary
- Kingdom of Slavonia, early modern province of the Habsburg Monarchy
- SS Slavonia, several ships

== See also ==
- Eastern Slavonia (disambiguation)
- Western Slavonia (disambiguation)
- Slavonian (disambiguation)
