= Greek Catholic Church in Croatia and Serbia =

Eastern Catholic church

- Croatian: Grkokatolička crkva u Hrvatskoj i Srbiji; Serbian: Гркокатоличка црква у Хрватској и Србији
- Type: Particular church (sui iuris)
- Classification: Christian
- Orientation: Eastern Catholic
- Polity: Episcopal
- Structure: Two eparchies
- Pope: Leo XIV
- Bishops: Milan Stipić, Đura Džudžar
- Region: Bosnia and Herzegovina, Croatia, Serbia, Slovenia
- Language: Church Slavonic
- Liturgy: Byzantine Rite

The Greek Catholic Church in Croatia and Serbia (Note: Latin: Ecclesia Graeco-Catholica Croatiae et Serbiae; Serbo-Croatian: Grkokatolička crkva u Hrvatskoj i Srbiji, Гркокатоличка црква у Хрватској и Србији) or Byzantine Catholic Church of Croatia and Serbia, is a particular (sui iuris) Eastern Catholic church in full communion with the Catholic Church. It consists of the Greek Catholic Eparchy of Križevci, covering Croatia, Slovenia, Bosnia and Herzegovina, and the Greek Catholic Eparchy of Ruski Krstur, covering Serbia.

Although the two eparchies are canonically linked, the church has no unified structure, nor an ecclesiastical province of its own, since the Eparchy of Križevci is suffragan to the Latin Church Archdiocese of Zagreb, and the Eparchy of Ruski Krstur is directly subject to the Holy See.

== History ==
The Greek Catholic Church in Croatia and Serbia originated from the Union of Marča in 1611. The Greek Catholic Church in Croatia has existed since the 17th century and was created by Christians of the Greek-Slavic rite who fled before the Turks from Bosnia and Slavonia and moved to the area of the Military Frontier (Vojna krajina) and the western parts of Croatia. The seat of the Greek Catholic Church in Croatia has been in Križevci since 1777.

In May 1836, the first Ruthenian Greek Catholic parish in the territory of today's Croatia was founded in Petrovci.

=== Croatian War of Independence (1991–1995) ===
During the Croatian War of Independence (1991–1995), the Greek Catholic Eparchy of Križevci was severely affected by military operations and ethnic displacement, particularly in Eastern Slavonia, where a significant portion of its Croatian, Rusyn and Ukrainian faithful resided. Following the Battle of Vukovar and the establishment of the self-proclaimed Republic of Serbian Krajina (RSK) in late 1991, Greek Catholic parishes in occupied areas—including Vukovar, Petrovci, and Mikluševci—suffered widespread population expulsion, looting, and damage to church infrastructure alongside Roman Catholic institutions.

While Serbian nationalist wartime rhetoric frequently targeted the Holy See as a political adversary, the persecution of Greek Catholics in RSK-held territories was primarily driven by broader campaigns of ethnic cleansing against all non-Serb populations rather than specific theological distinctions. Furthermore, the establishment of international borders between Croatia and the Federal Republic of Yugoslavia severed traditional pastoral and community ties between the eparchy's parishes in Slavonia and the larger Rusyn-Ukrainian Greek Catholic population in Vojvodina, prompting the subsequent administrative reorganization of the eparchy by the Holy See in the early 2000s.

=== Since the break-up of Yugoslavia ===
Until 2001, the Eparchy of Križevci had full jurisdiction over all Eastern Catholics of the Byzantine Rite throughout the entire territory of former Yugoslavia, including all of its successor states: Croatia, Slovenia, Bosnia and Herzegovina, Serbia, Montenegro and North Macedonia. During that time, it mostly gathered its faithful among the Croats in central and eastern Croatia, among the Pannonian Rusyns and Ukrainians in eastern Croatia, northern Bosnia and northern Serbia and among Macedonians in North Macedonia.

After the establishment of independent successor states from what had been Yugoslavia, the process of administrative reorganization was initiated. In 2001, a separate Greek Catholic Apostolic Exarchate of Macedonia was formed for Greek Catholics in North Macedonia. It was fully separated from the Eparchy of Križevci and proclaimed as directly subject only to the Holy See.

In 2003, a new apostolic exarchate was created for Greek Catholics in Serbia and Montenegro, the Apostolic Exarchate of Serbia and Montenegro. Its first exarch Đura Džudžar was appointed in 2003, with residence in Ruski Krstur. This exarchate remained in association with the Eparchy of Križevci.

After those changes, the jurisdiction of the Eparchy of Križevci was confined to Croatia, Slovenia, and Bosnia-Herzegovina.

In 2013, all Catholics of Byzantine Rite in Montenegro were entrusted to the local Latin bishops, so the jurisdiction of Apostolic Exarchate of Serbia and Montenegro was reduced to Serbia only. The Apostolic Exarchate of Serbia was elevated to the Greek Catholic Eparchy of Ruski Krstur in 2018.

=== Current hierarchy of the church ===
The present Greek Catholic Church of Croatia and Serbia episcopate (3 hierarchs as per 17 October 2020) is as follows:

Eparchial Bishops:

- Milan Stipić, Bishop of Križevci (since 2020)
- Đura Džudžar, Bishop of Ruski Krstur (since 2018)

Emeritus Hierarch:

- Nikola Kekić, Bishop emeritus of Križevci (since 2019)

== Liturgy and extent ==
The liturgy is the Slavonic form of Byzantine Rite, using the Old Church Slavonic language and the Cyrillic alphabet.

The Eparchy of Križevci reported for the year 2010 a total of 21,509 faithful (in Croatia, Slovenia, and Bosnia-Herzegovina). At that time, the Apostolic Exarchate for Serbia and Montenegro reported 22,369 faithful.

== Gallery ==
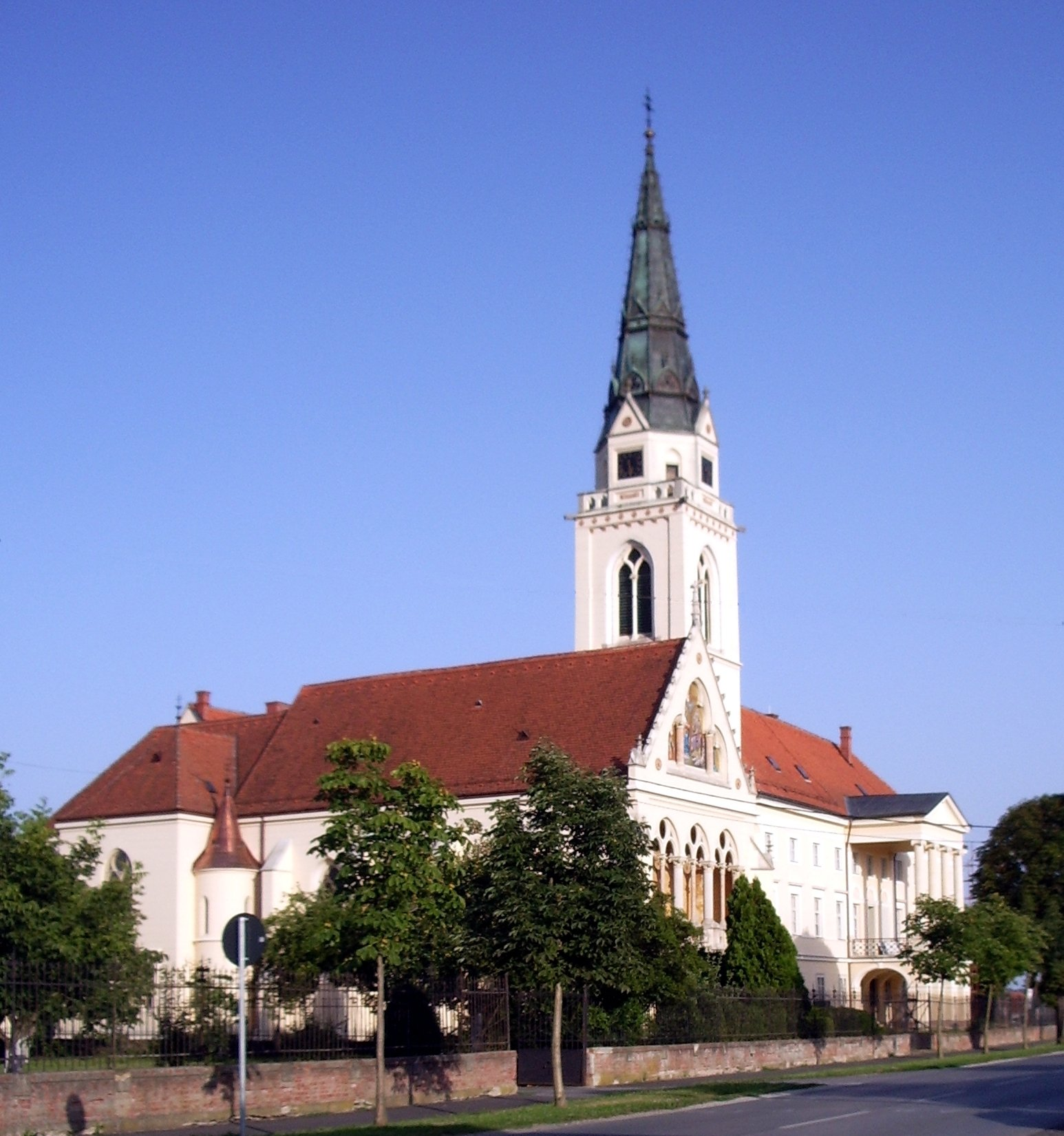
Cathedral of the Holy Trinity in Križevci, Croatia

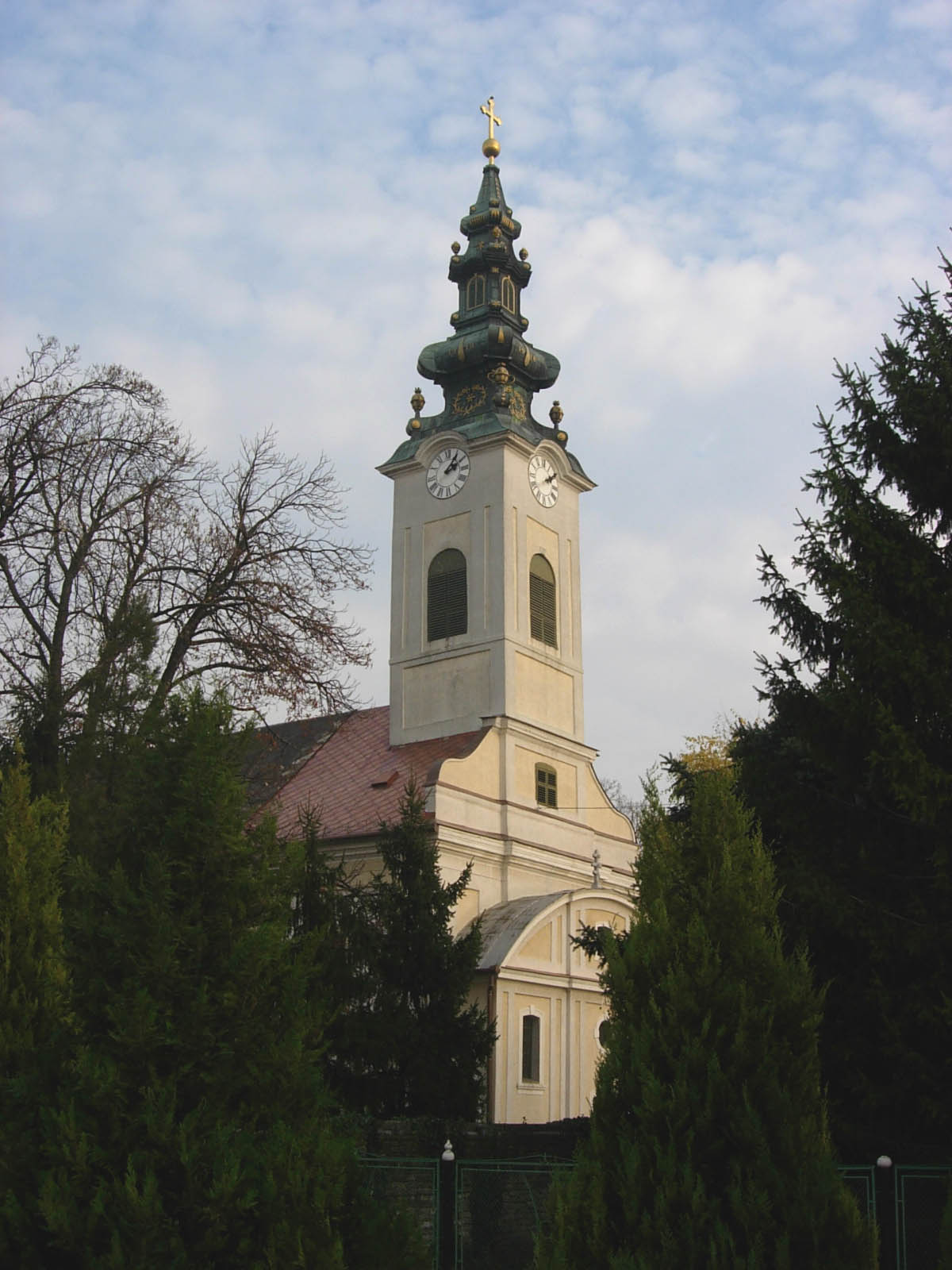
Saint Nicholas Cathedral in Ruski Krstur, Serbia

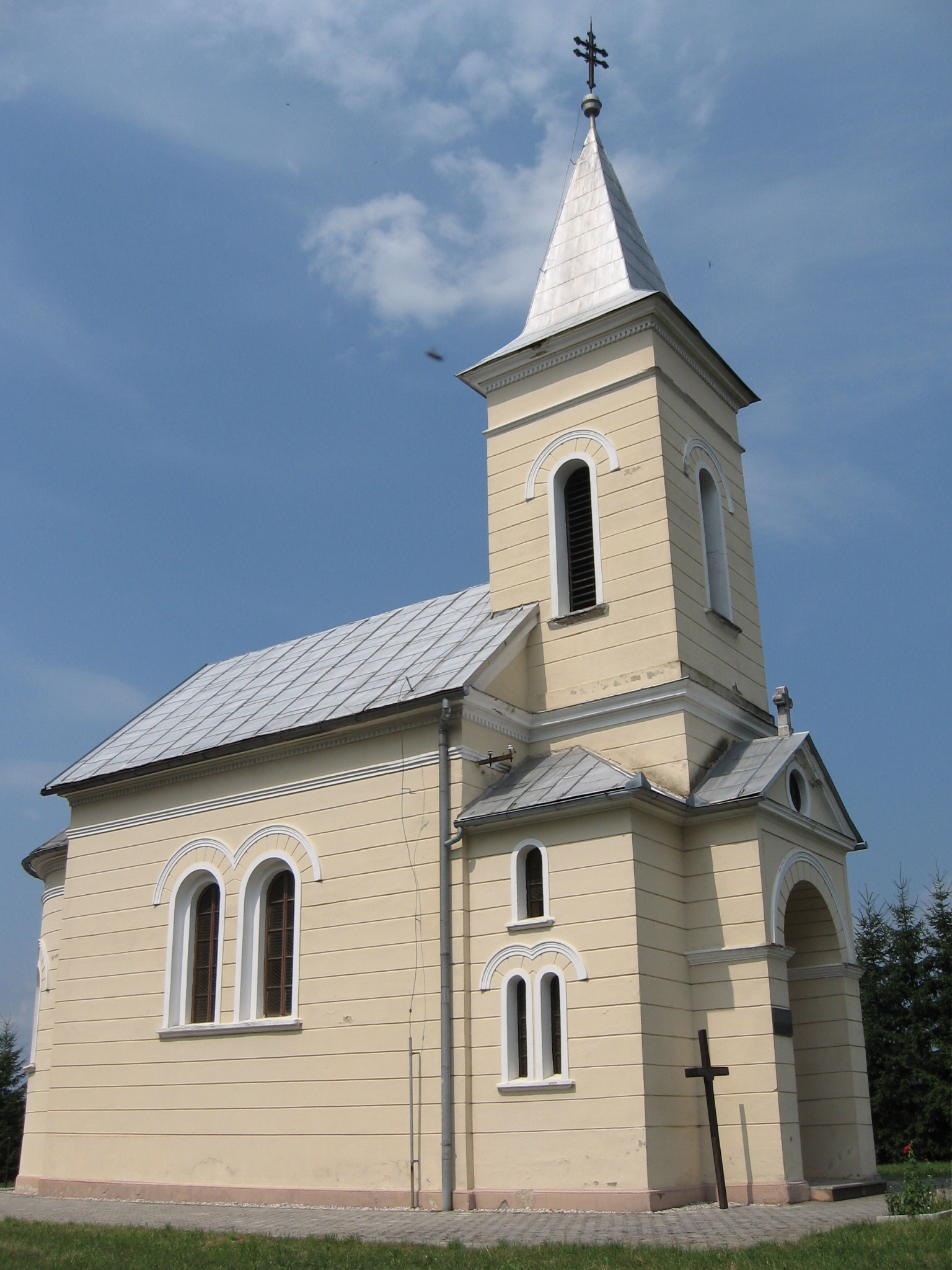
Church of Sts. Cyril and Methodius in Metlika, Slovenia

== See also ==
- Catholic Church in Bosnia and Herzegovina
- Catholic Church in Croatia
- Catholic Church in Serbia
- Catholic Church in Slovenia
