= Bačinci =

Bačinci Бачинци (Serbian) Бачинци (Pannonian Rusyn)
- Village (Selo)
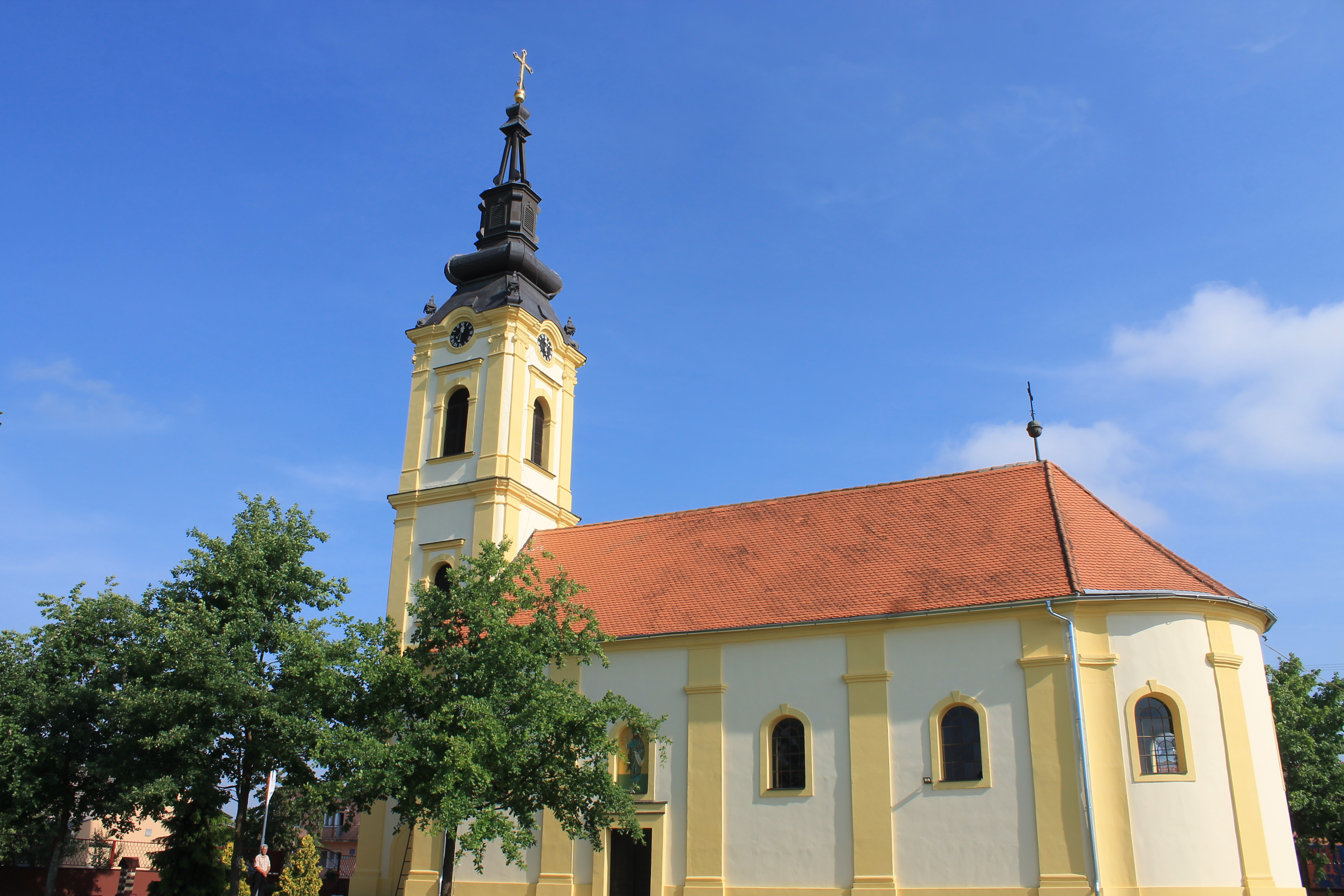
- Serbian Orthodox church
- Interactive map of Bačinci
- Location within Vojvodina Location within Serbia Location within Europe
- Coordinates: 45°04′54″N 19°18′29″E
- Country: Serbia
- Province: Vojvodina
- Region: Syrmia
- District: Srem
- Municipality: Šid

Population (2002)
  - Total: 1,374
- Time zone: UTC+1 (CET)
  - Summer (DST): UTC+2 (CEST)

Bačinci (Cyrillic: Бачинци) is a village located in Syrmia, Vojvodina, Serbia. It is situated in the Šid municipality, in the Srem District. The village has a Serb ethnic majority and its population numbering 1,180 people (2011 census).

== Name ==
The name of the village in Serbian is plural.

== History ==
Following Ottoman retreat from the region, the Lordship of Ilok and Upper Syrmia was established, and the village became part of its domain.

== Historical population ==
- 1961: 1,694
- 1971: 1,538
- 1981: 1,324
- 1991: 1,298
- 2002: 1,374

== See also ==
- List of places in Serbia
- List of cities, towns and villages in Vojvodina
- Church of St. Nicholas, Bačinci
- Church of St. Luke, Bačinci
