= Ruski Krstur =

Ruski Krstur Руски Крстур (Serbian) Руски Керестур (Pannonian Rusyn) Bácskeresztúr (Hungarian)
- Village (Selo)
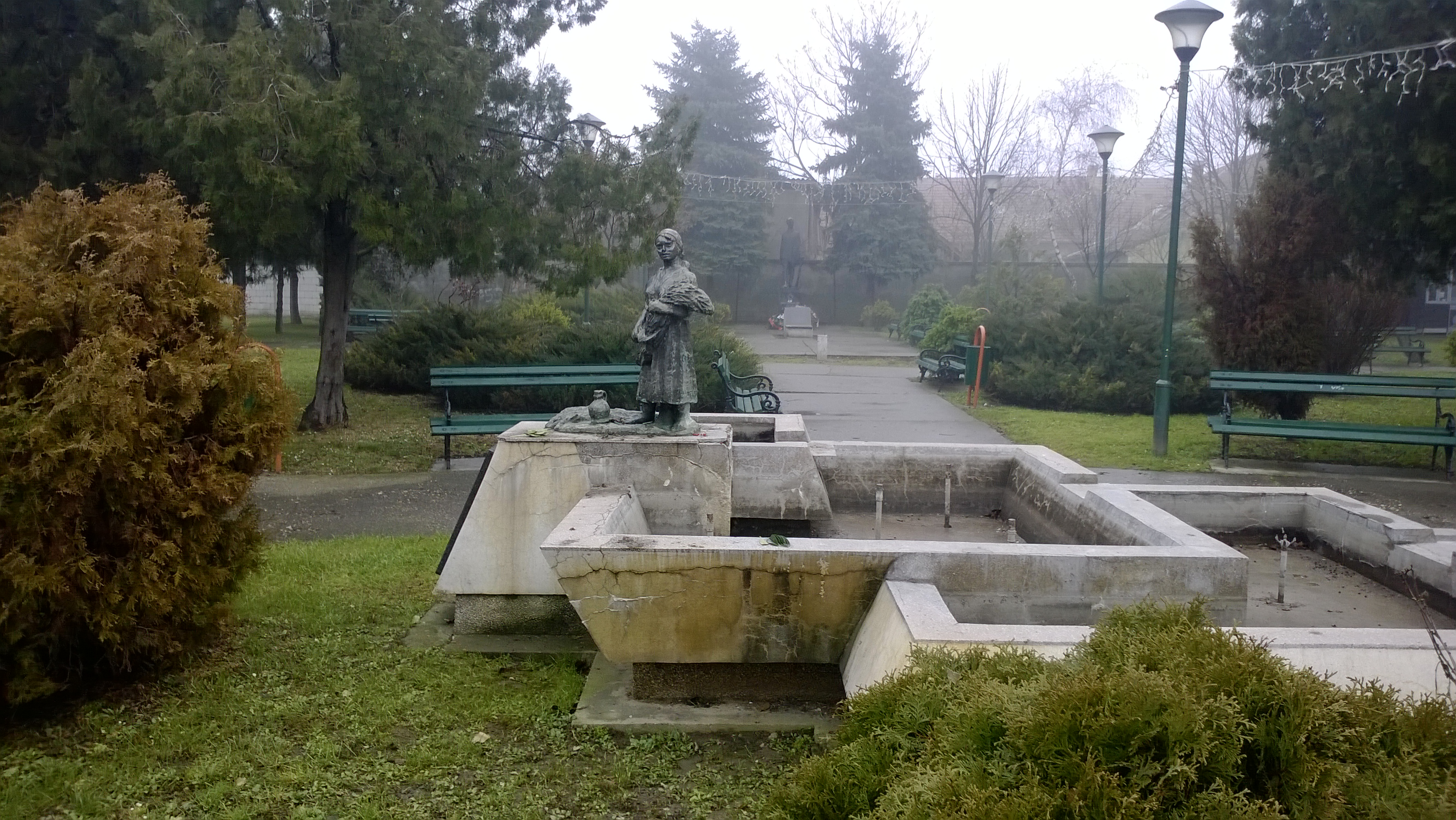
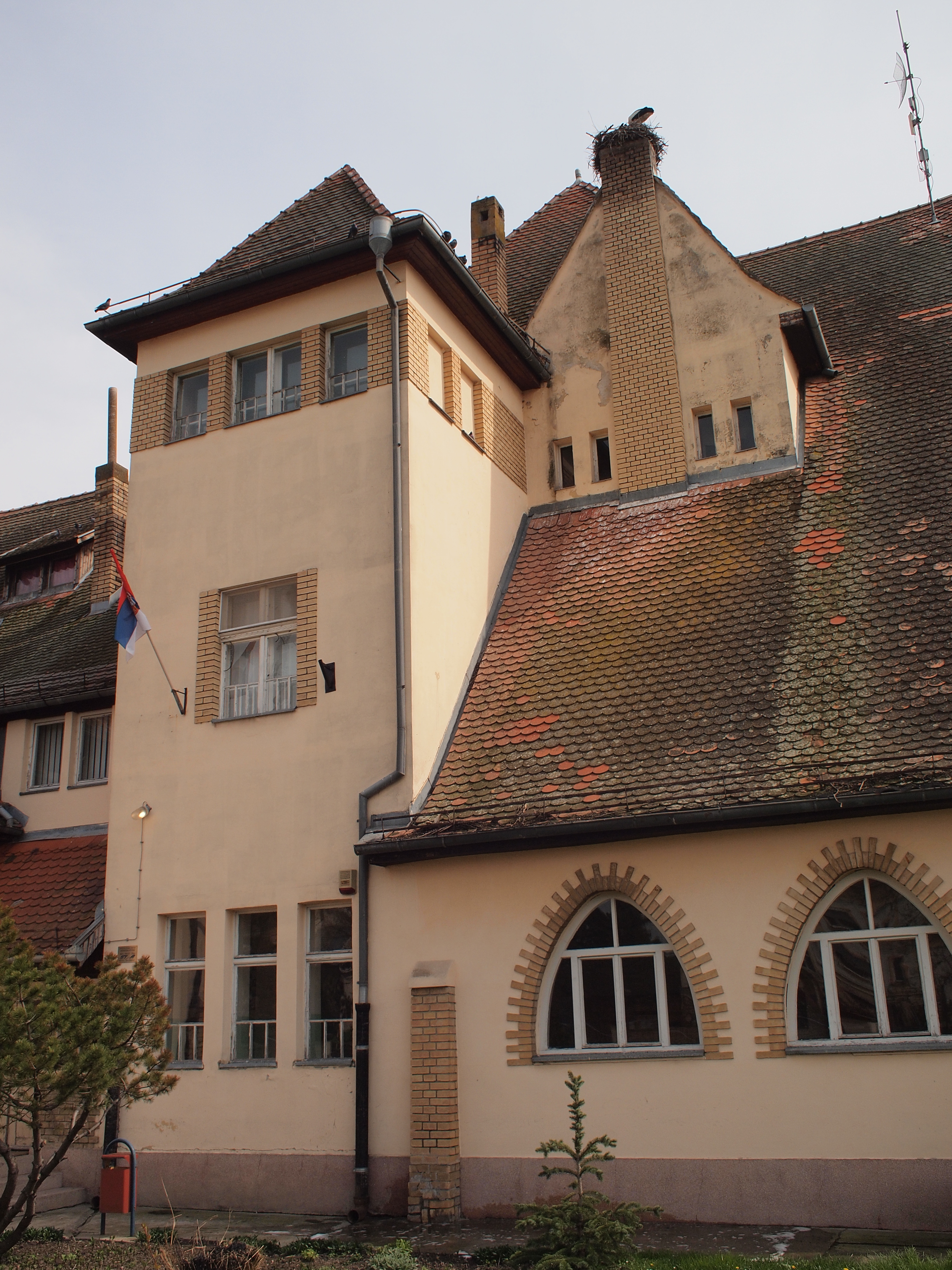
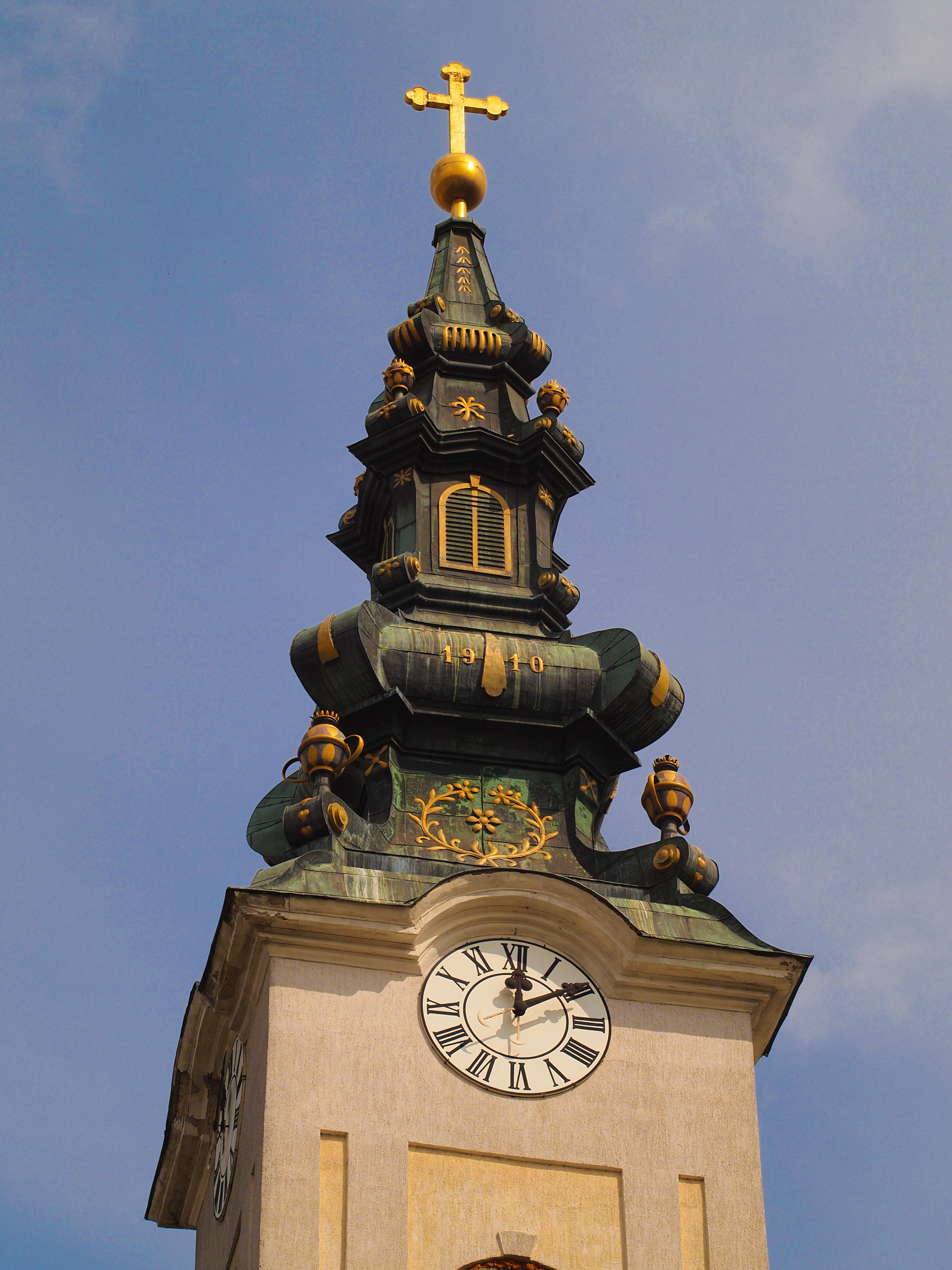
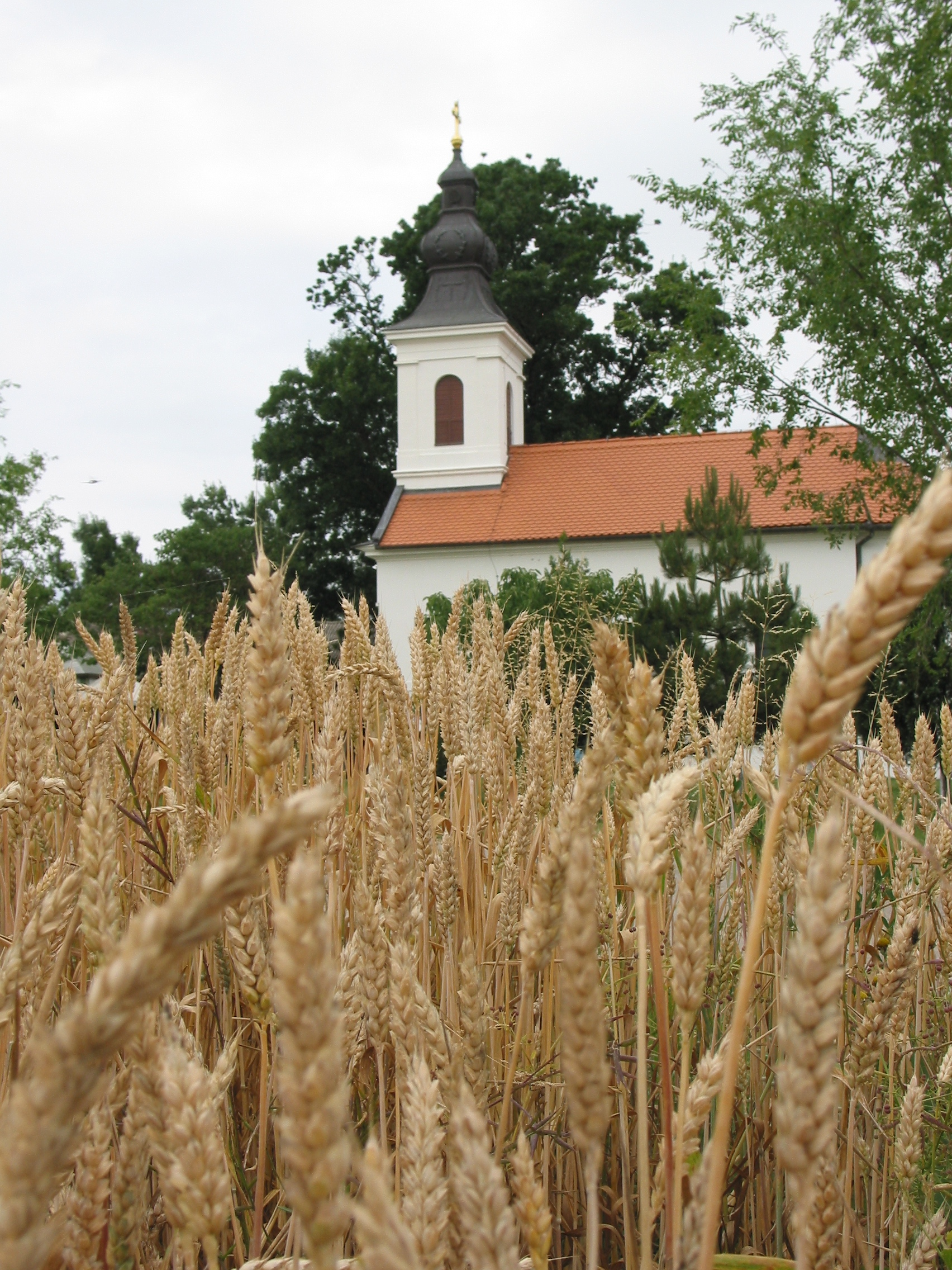
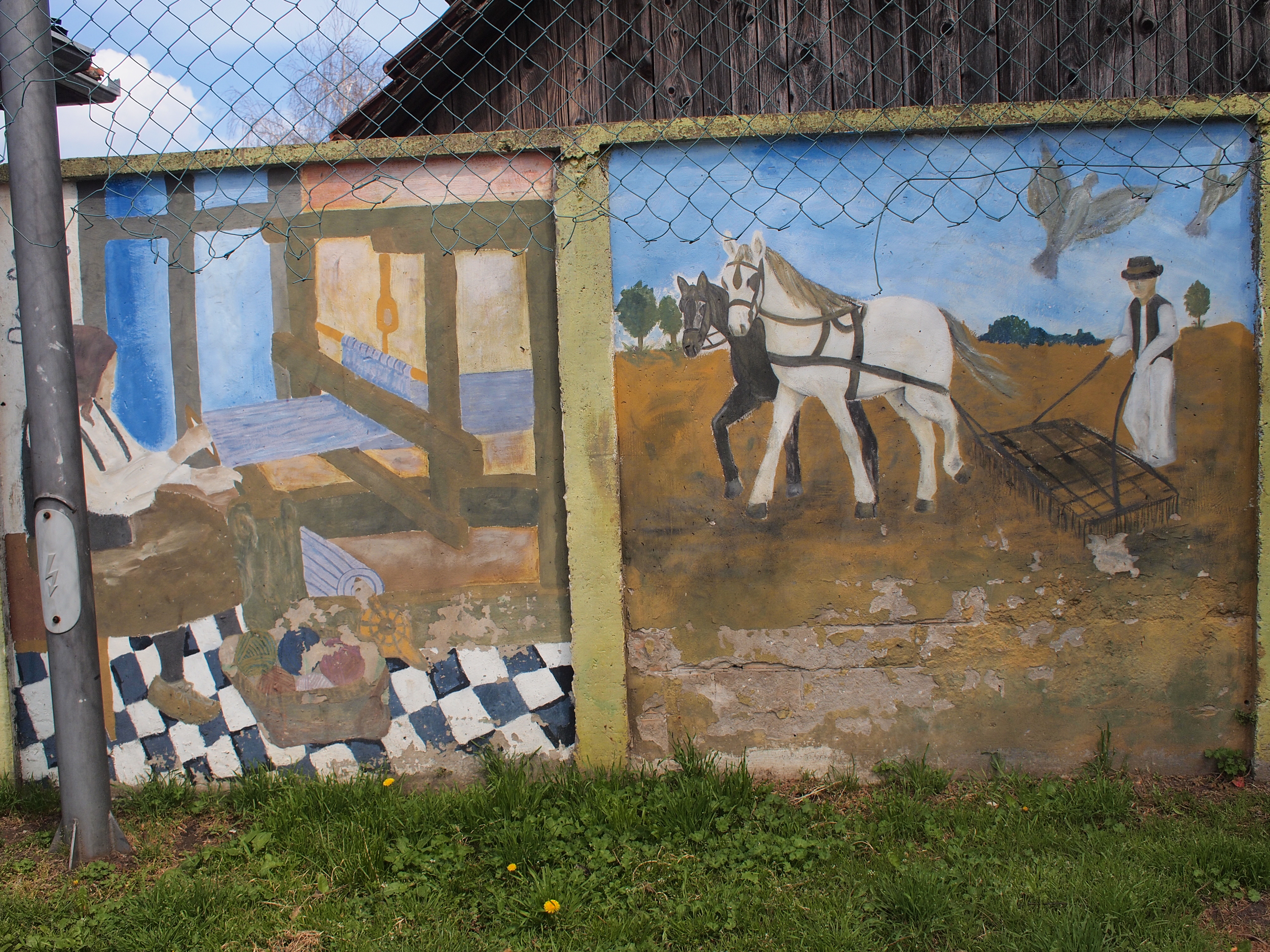
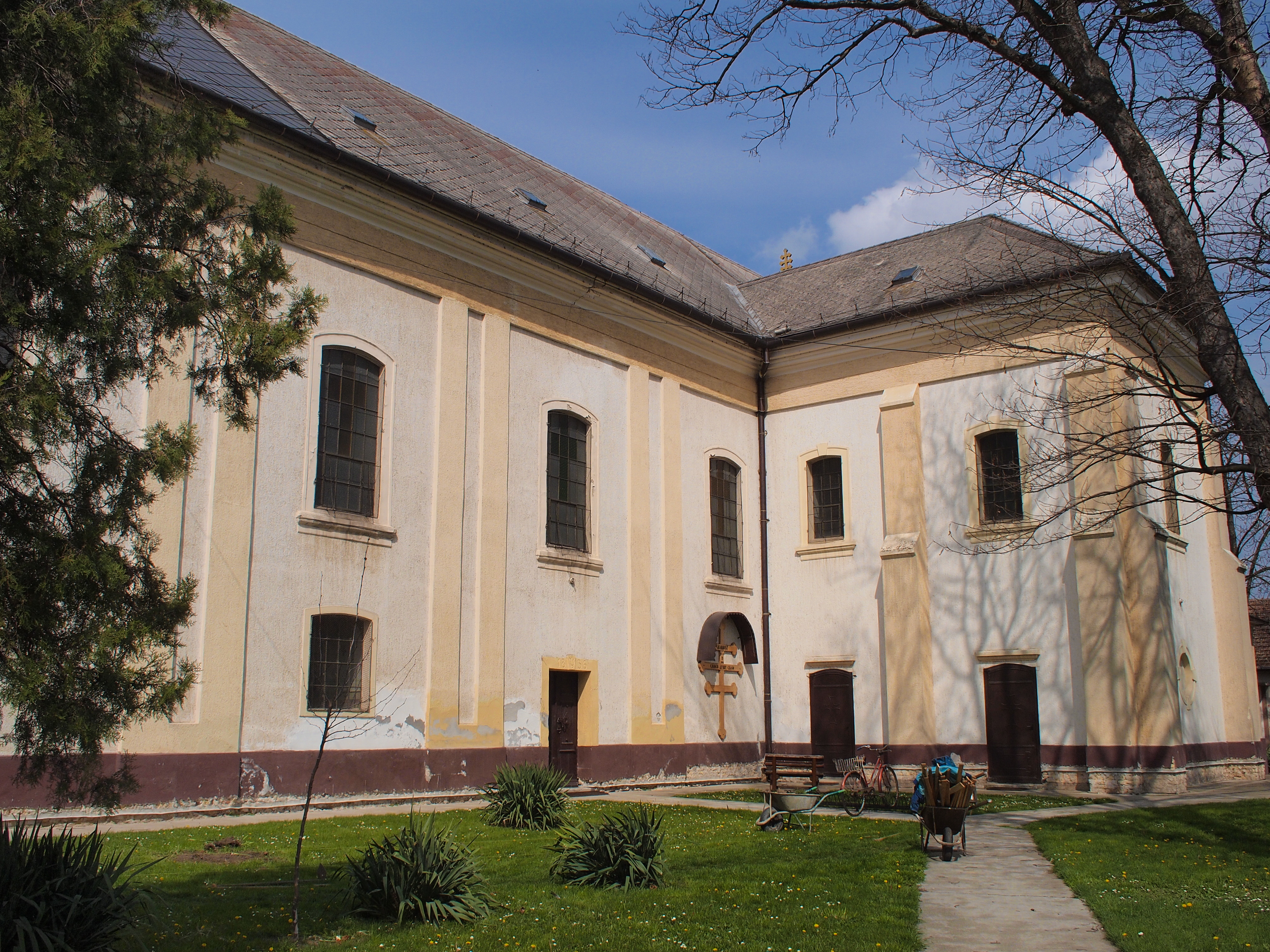
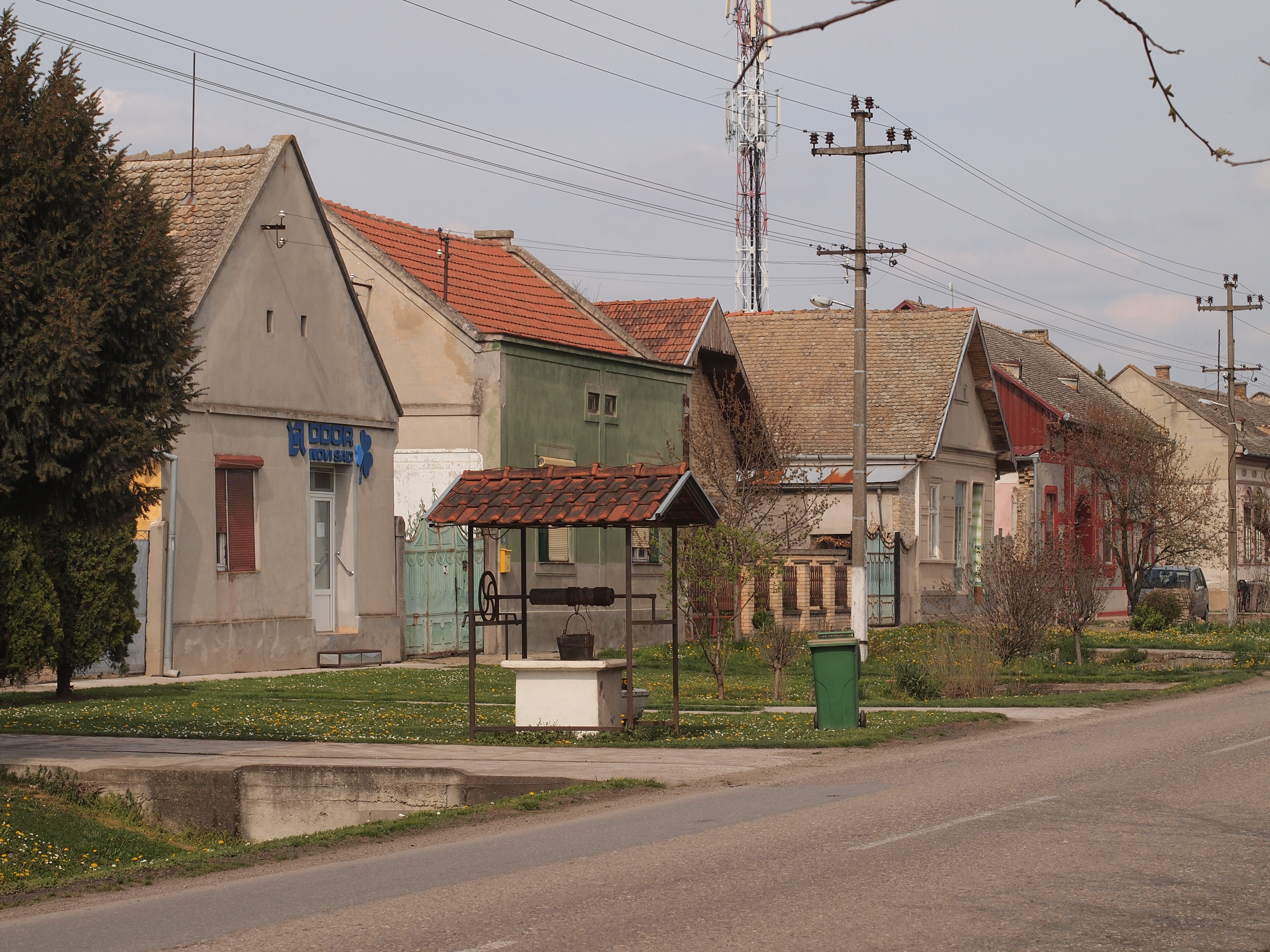
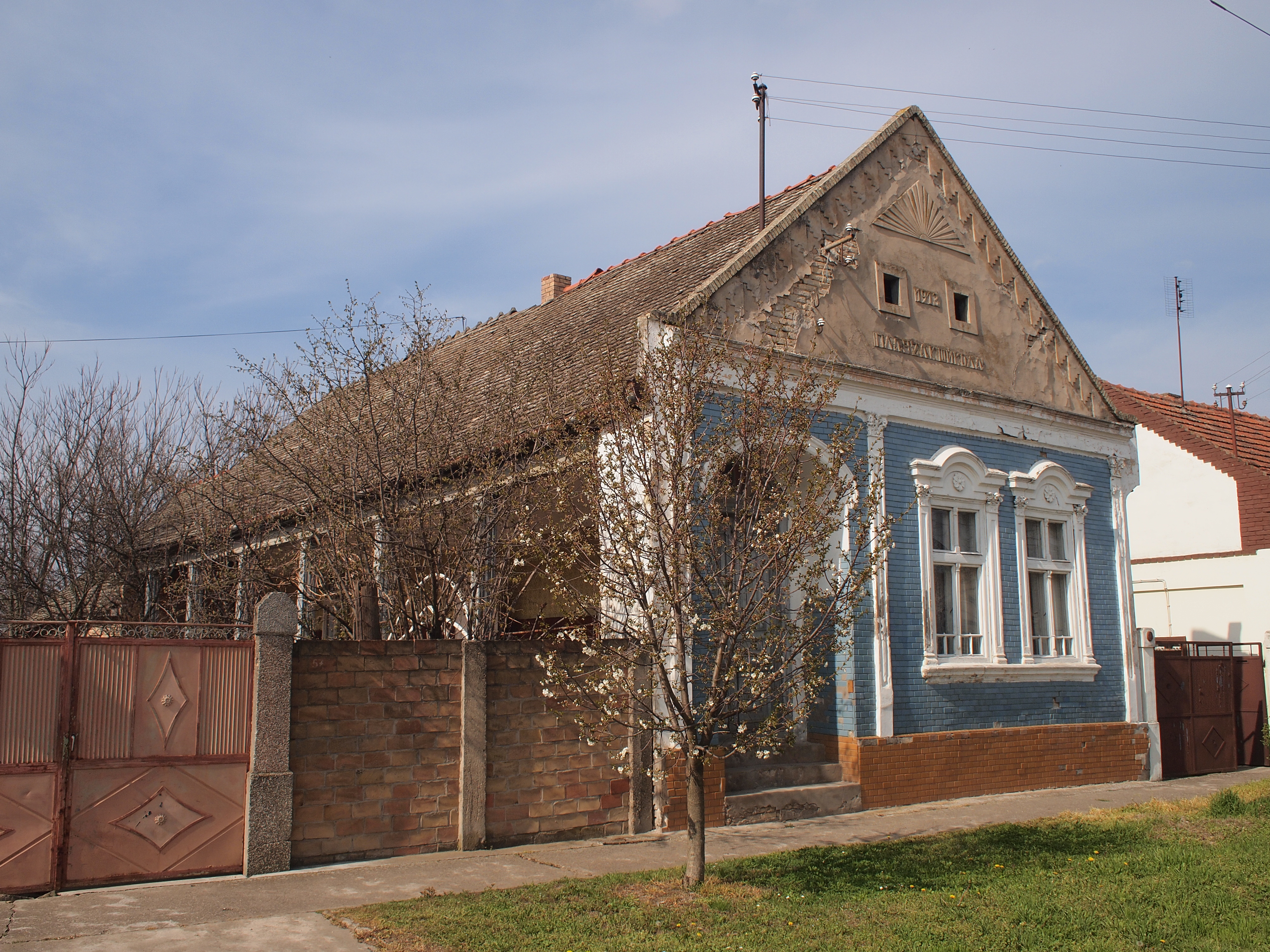

- Location within Vojvodina Location within Serbia Location within Europe
- Coordinates: 45°34′N 19°25′E
- Country: Serbia
- Province: Vojvodina
- Region: Bačka
- District: West Bačka
- Municipality: Kula

Population (2022)
  - Total: 3,846
- Time zone: UTC+1 (CET)
  - Summer (DST): UTC+2 (CEST)

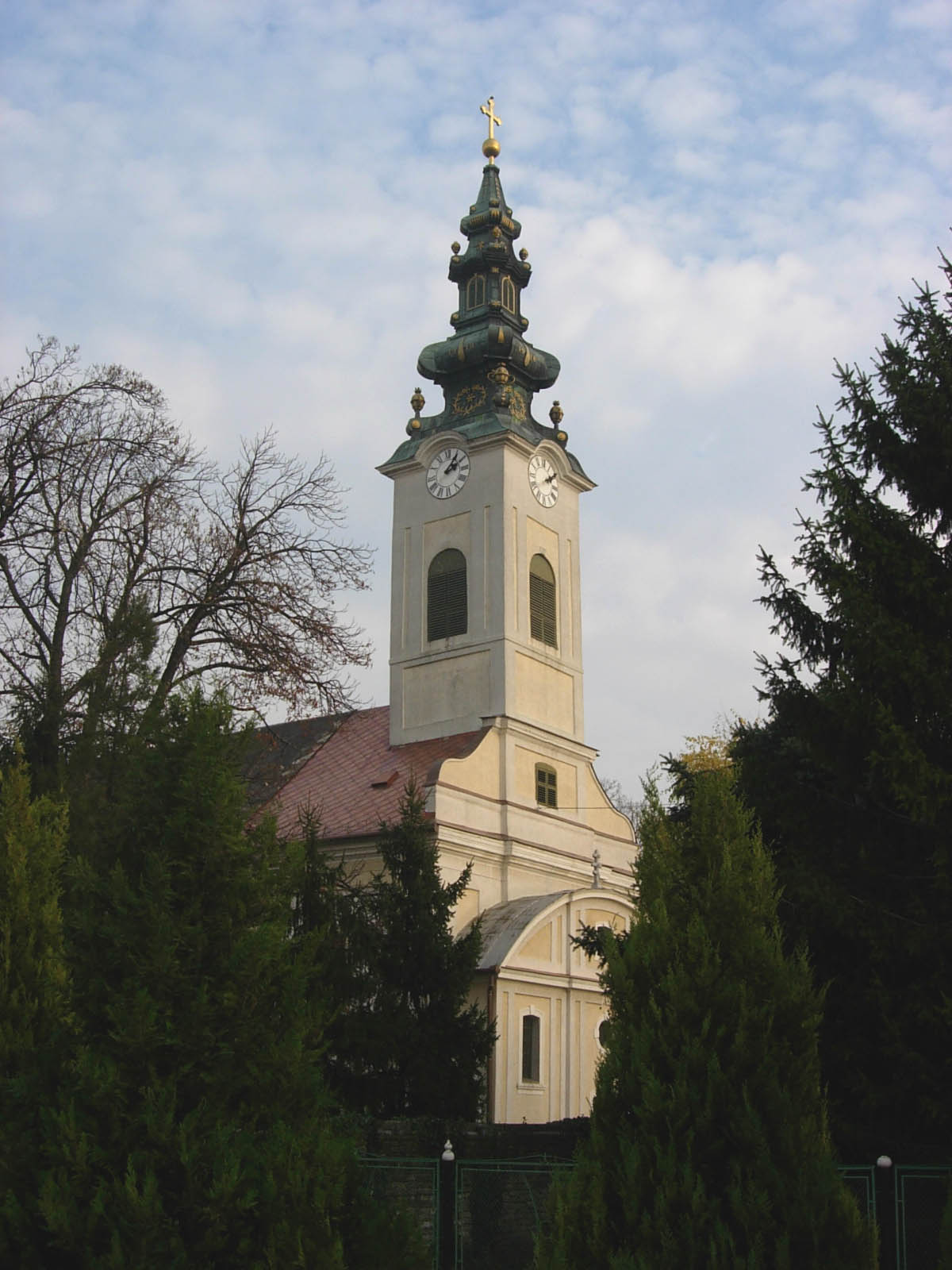
St. Nicholas Cathedral in Ruski Krstur

Ruski Krstur (Serbian: Руски Крстур; Pannonian Rusyn: Руски Керестур, romanized: Ruski Kerestur) is a village located in the municipality of Kula, West Bačka District, Vojvodina, Serbia. The village has a Rusyn ethnic majority. and a population of 3,846 people (2022 census). Ruski Krstur is the cultural centre of the Rusyns in Serbia. The number of Rusyns in Ruski Krstur is in constant decline as many of them have moved out to Canada concentrating in the town of North Battleford, Saskatchewan. The village is the seat of the Greek Catholic Eparchy of Ruski Krstur, part of the wider Greek Catholic Church of Croatia and Serbia.

== Name ==
Its name means "the Rusyn Krstur" (There is also a village called Srpski Krstur, meaning "the Serb Krstur", in Vojvodina).

The Hungarian name for the village derived from the Hungarian word "kereszt", which means "cross" in English. "Ur" (úr) means "lord." "Keresztúr," as seen in the Hungarian place name "Bodrogkeresztúr," likely refers to a crucifix (Our Lord on the Cross on the Bodrog river - suggesting that more places called Keresztúr were known). The first written record of Ruski Krstur was made during the administration of the Kingdom of Hungary in 1410 and then in 1452, mentioning it under name Kerezthwr.

In Hungarian the village is known as Bácskeresztúr; in Slovak as Ruský Kеrеstur; and in Croatian as Ruski Krstur, in Rusyn Руски Керестур.

== History ==
Krstur was mentioned for the first time in history in 1495, as a place in Bačka County. Krstur is also mentioned as Kerestur in a charter from 1522. In the Turkish defter from 1590, Krstur is mentioned as Upper (gornji) Krstur.

During Turkish rule, Krstur was inhabited by an Orthodox population. In 1715, Krstur had 11 households, in 1720, 14 households, and in 1725, Krstur had 20 households. In 1741, all the inhabitants left Krstur, and in 1742, Krstur was referred to as a deserted settlement. After that, Krstur is mentioned as a wasteland that is leased by the state chamber. In 1746, the merchant Bučuklić held the lease over Krstur, and in 1749, the merchant Vujić got the lease over Krstur.

The settlement of Krstur began in 1751, when the regional administrator in Bačka, Franz Joseph Redl, signed an agreement with the free peasant Mihajlo Munkači from the village of Červenovo in Bereg county on the settlement of 200 Rusyns families of the Greek Catholic faith from northern Hungary. The agreement was signed on January 17, 1751, which has been accepted as the day of the official settlement of Rusyns in this area. In the same year, Munkači managed to settle many Rusyns from the Hungarian counties of Munkačka, Ungvar, Saltmars and Ogačka in Krstur.

Since then, Krstur has been mainly inhabited by Rusyns, with a small number of Serbs, Germans and Jews. Krstur had 2,000 inhabitants by the end of the 18th century.

The historic St. Nicholas Cathedral in Ruski Krstur was built in 1784 and underwent a major reconstruction in 1836. The rich carving of the iconostasis is the work of Aksentij Marković from 1791. The walls were painted in 1936 by Milenko Djurić. The church is under the protection of the Republic of Serbia, as a Cultural Monument of Great Importance.

== Demographics ==
=== Historical population ===
- 1948: 5,874
- 1953: 6,115
- 1961: 5,873
- 1971: 5,960
- 1981: 5,826
- 1991: 5,636
- 2002: 5,213
- 2011: 4,585
- 2022: 3,846

=== Ethnic groups ===
According to data from the 2022 census, ethnic groups in the village include:

- 2,963 (77%) Rusyns
- 375 (9.7%) Serbs
- Others/Undeclared/Unknown

== Education ==
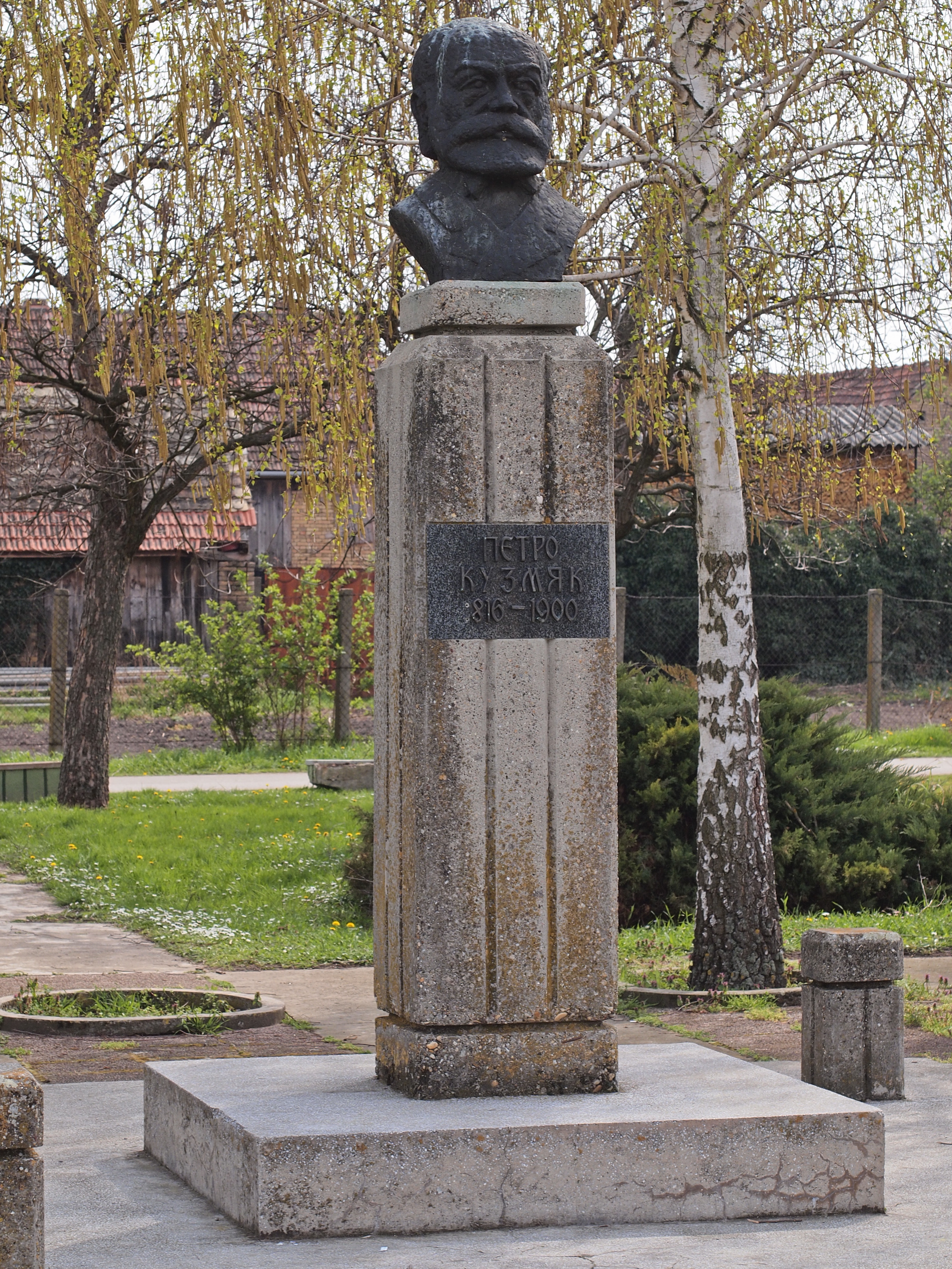
Petro Kuzmjak monument in Ruski Krstur

The first school in the Rusyn language was established in 1753. It developed over decades, from a basic literacy instruction into a full elementary public school. Nowadays, there is a primary school, "Petro Kuzmjak", with about 400 enrolled students, and the Gymnasium with about 220 students, offering instruction both in Rusyn and Serbian languages.

== Culture ==
The Cultural Center of Ruski Krstur dates back from 1872, when the first library was established. It has grown over time to include programs related to music, poetry, and folklore, among others.

Ruski Krstur Castle is an old school building from 1913. Today it serves as the headquarters of the National Council of Rusyns. In the same space, there is also a small ethnographic collection that includes a display of photographs, tools for old crafts, traditional clothing, bridal attire, and more.

The theater in Ruski Krstur was founded in 1971. It is the only Rusyn theater in Serbia, with a repertoire ranging from classics and folklore drama, to chamber and puppetry. In the first five decades of its work it produced over 120 original premieres.

== Politics ==
There is an initiative among inhabitants of Ruski Krstur that this settlement become its own municipality completely separate from Kula.

== See also ==
- List of places in Serbia
- List of cities, towns and villages in Vojvodina
- Pannonian Rusyns
- Greek Catholic Eparchy of Ruski Krstur
