= Đurđevo =

Coordinates: 45°19′29″N 20°03′53″E

Đurđevo Ђурђево (Serbian) Дюрдьов (Pannonian Rusyn)
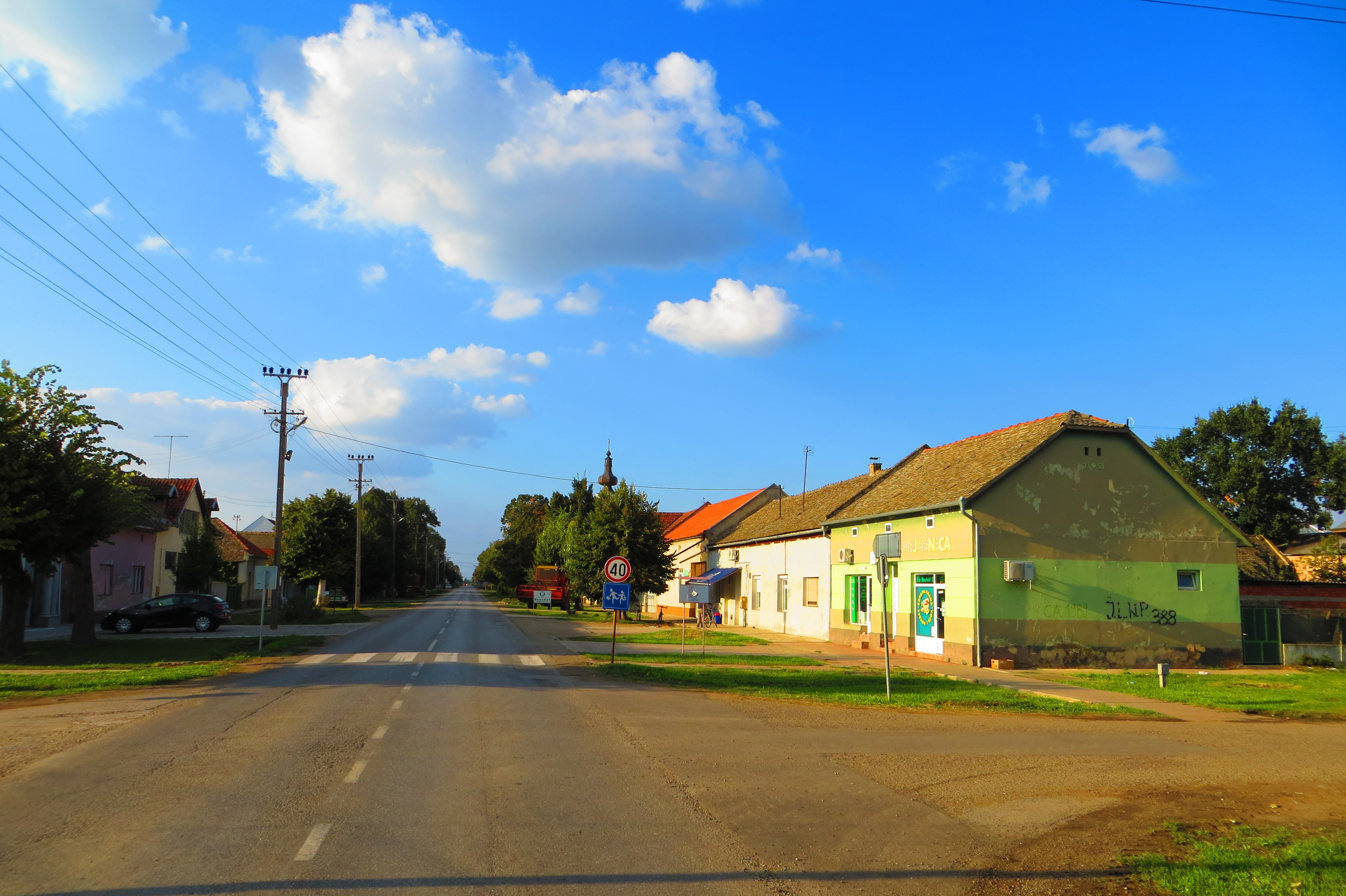
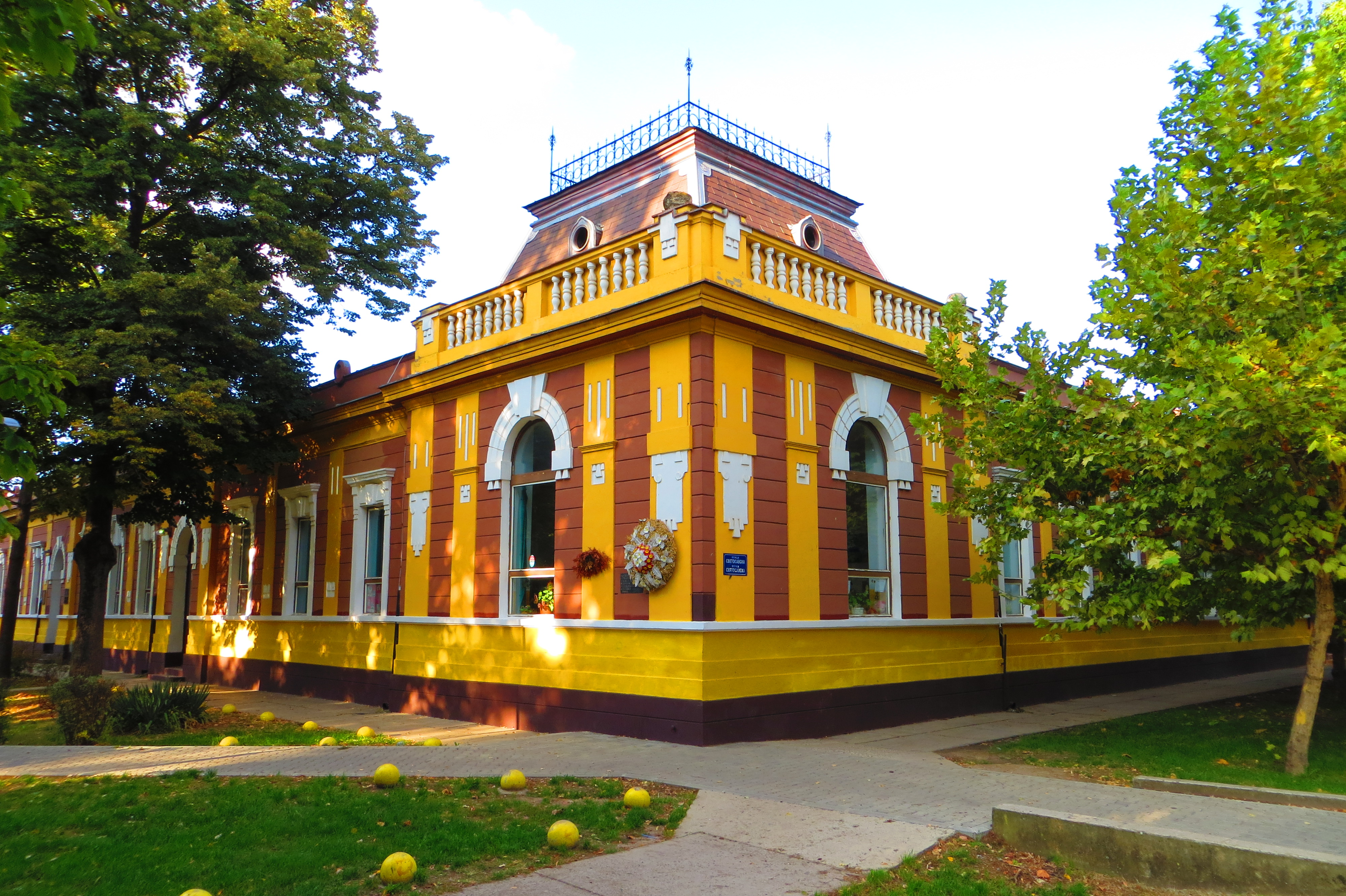
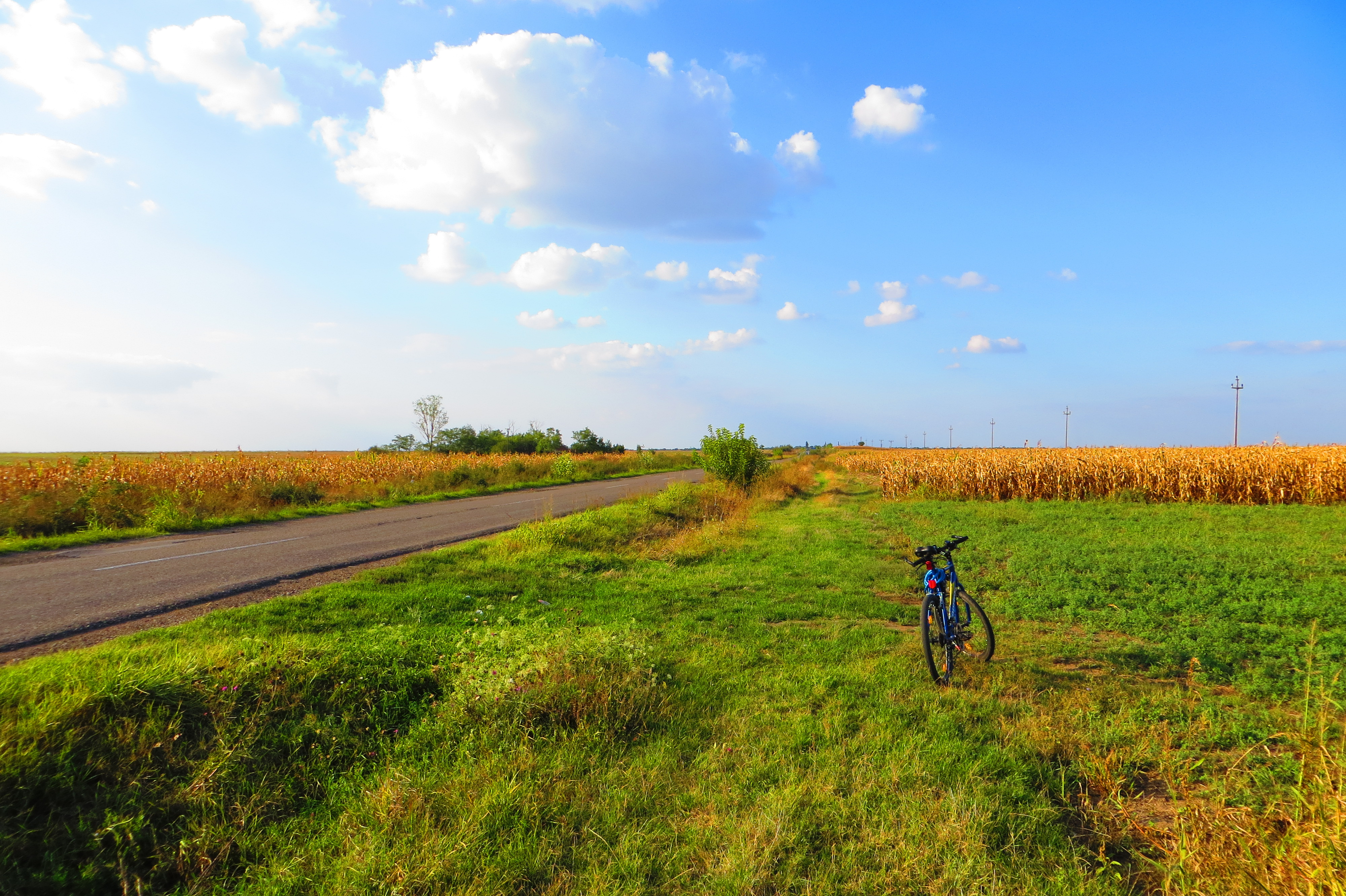
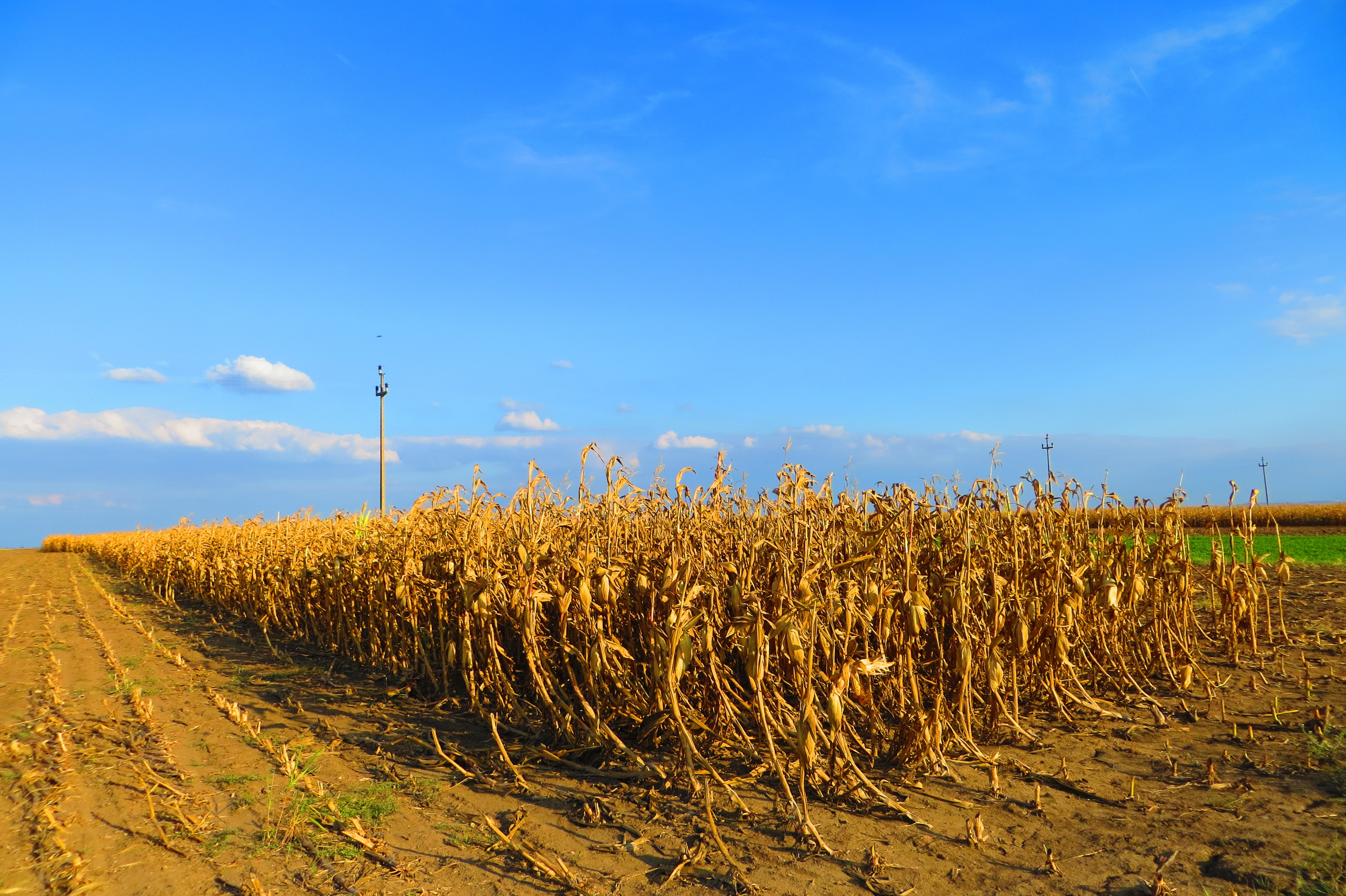
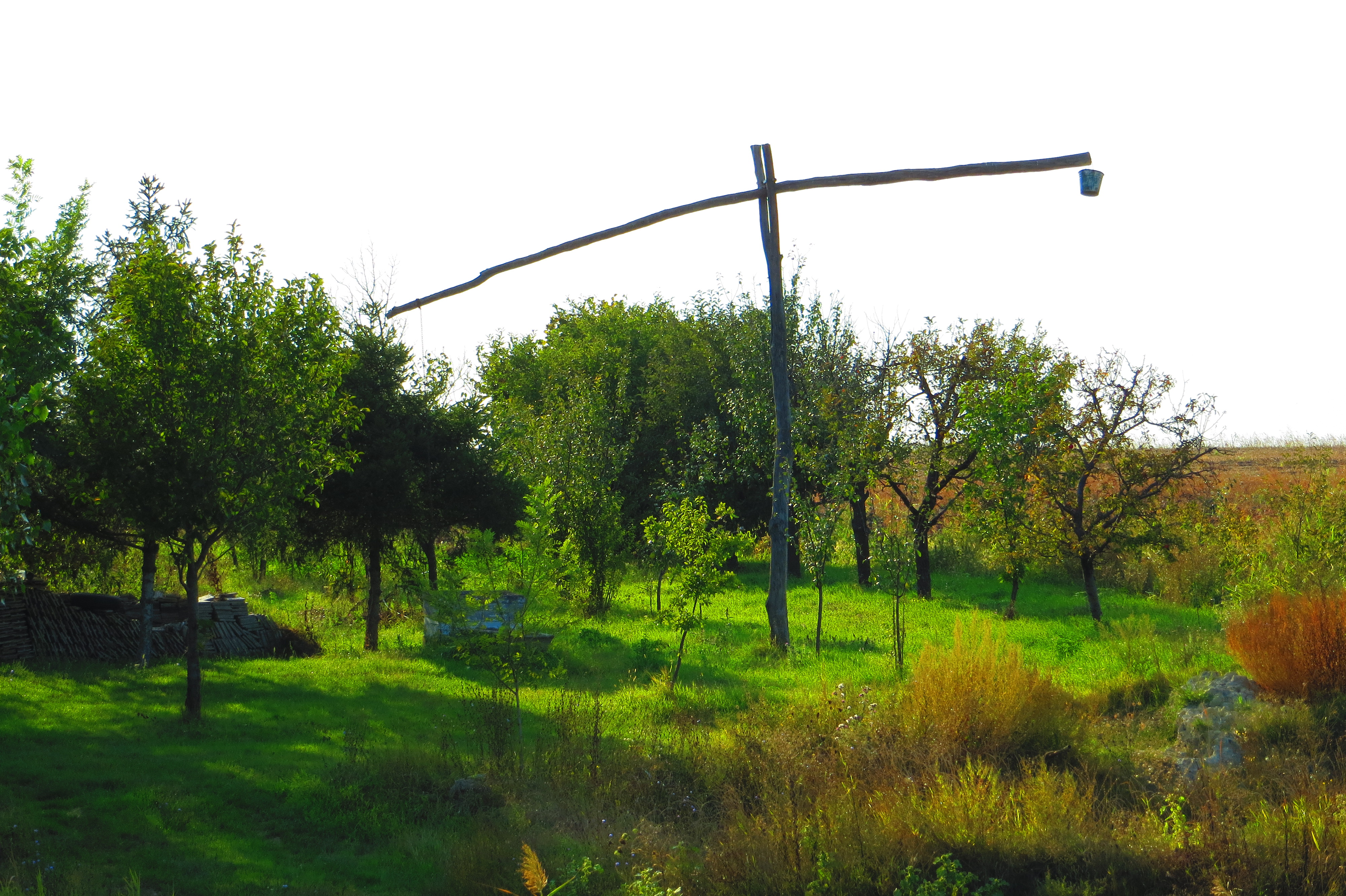
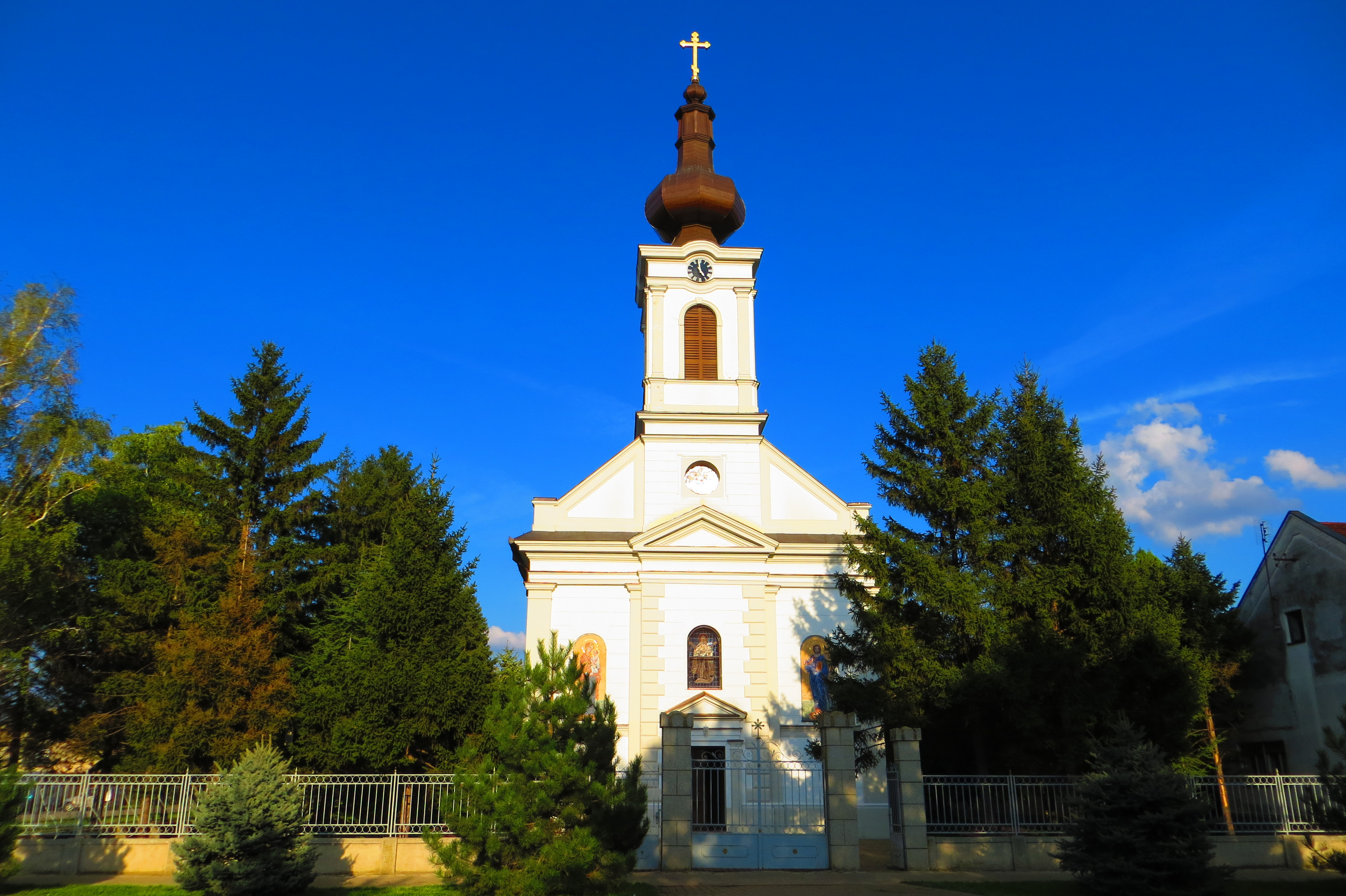
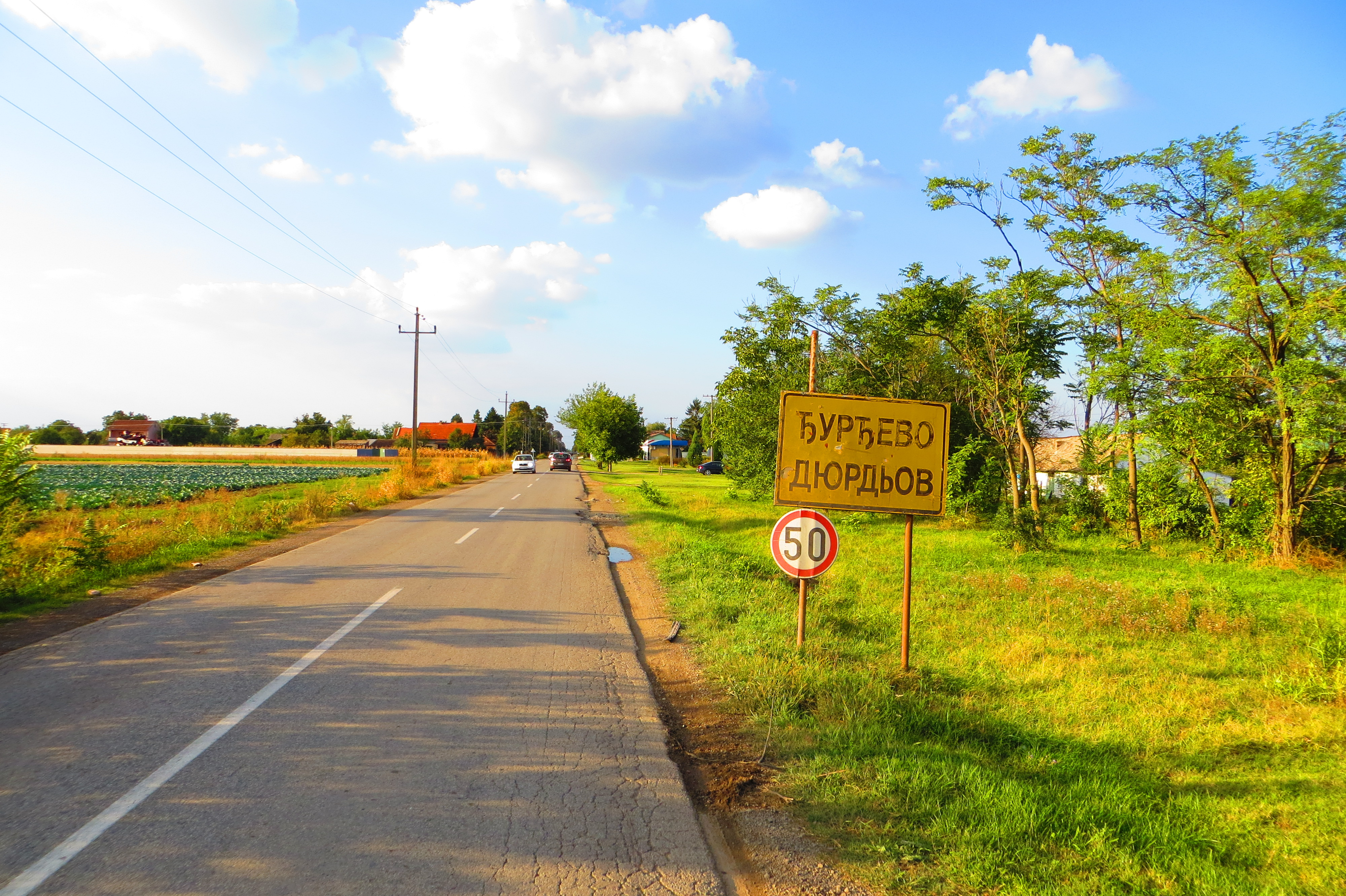
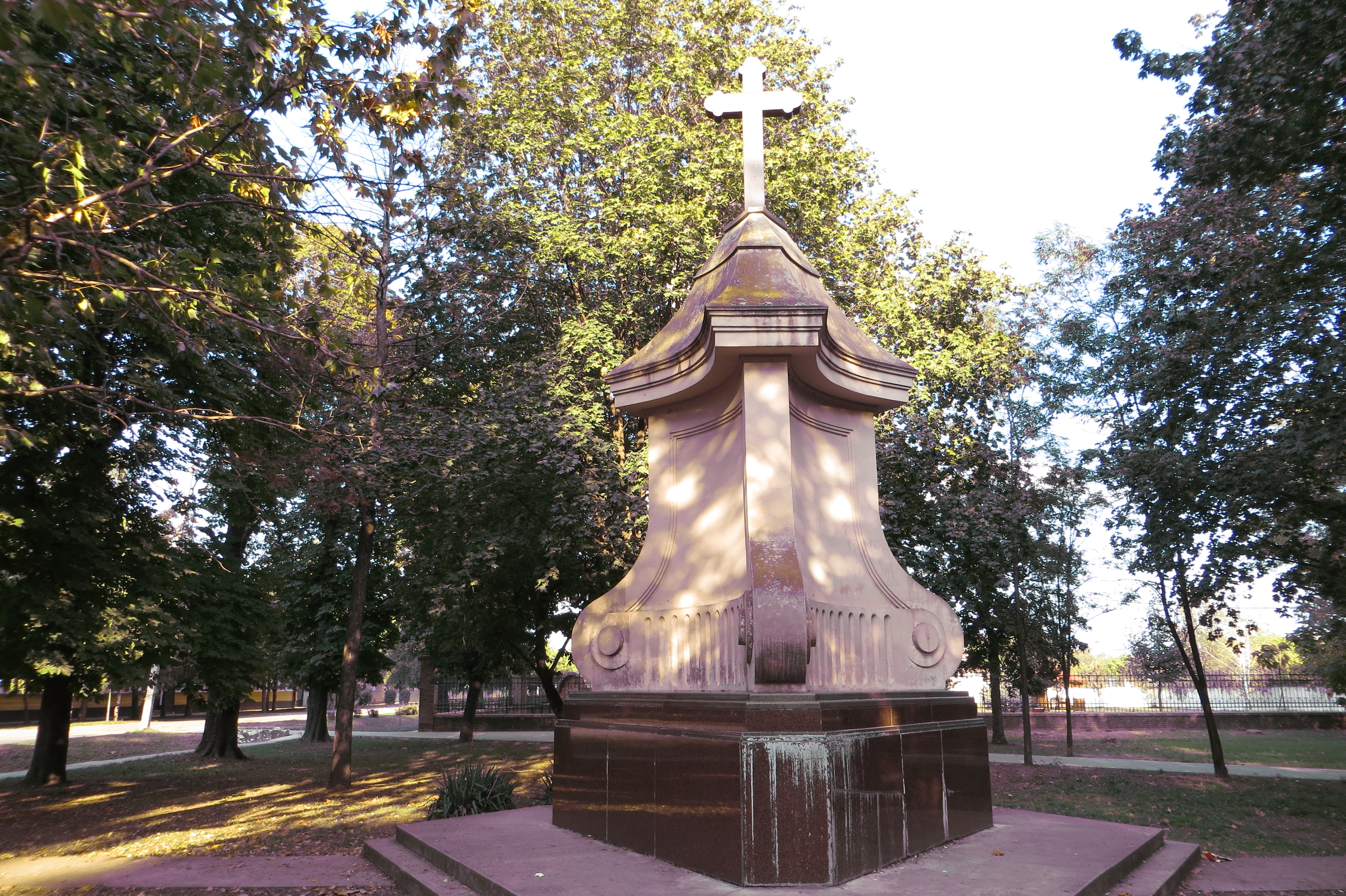
- Žabalj
- Interactive map of Đurđevo
- Country: Serbia
- Province: Vojvodina
- Region: Bačka
- District: South Bačka
- Municipality: Žabalj

Population (2022)
  - Total: 4,621
- Time zone: UTC+1 (CET)
- Postal code: 21239
- Area code: +381 21
- Website: MZ Đurđevo

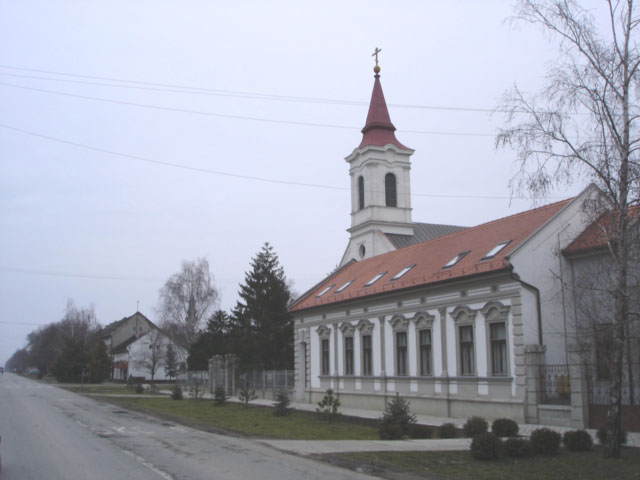
Main street and the Greek Catholic

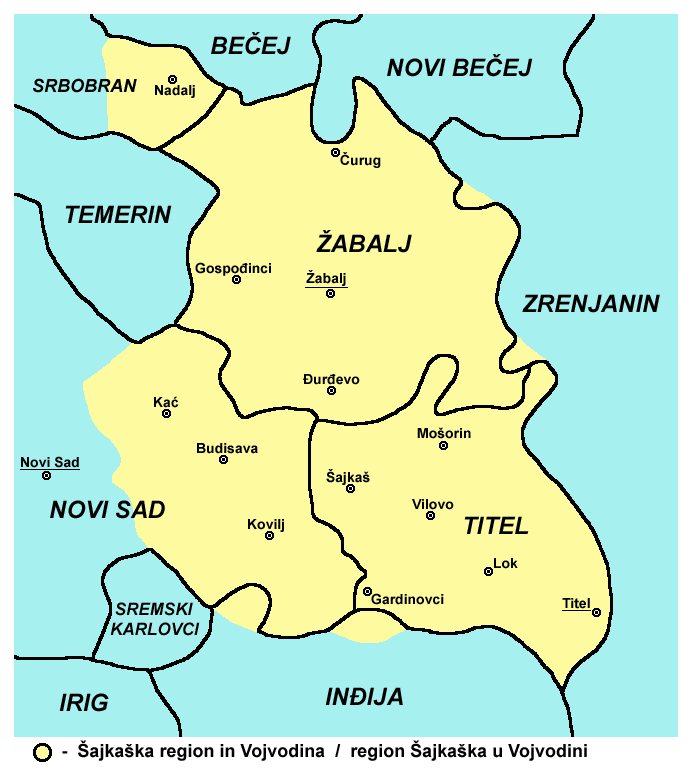
Map of the Žabalj municipality and Šajkaška region, showing the location of Đurđevo

Đurđevo (Serbian Cyrillic: Ђурђево; Pannonian Rusyn: Дюрдьов, romanized: D'urd'ov; Hungarian: Sajkásgyörgye) is a village located in the Žabalj municipality, in the South Bačka District of Serbia. It is situated in the Autonomous Province of Vojvodina. The village has a Serb ethnic majority and a population numbering 5,137 people (2002 census). Besides Serbs (numbering 3,538 people), the village also has a large Rusyn minority (numbering 1,197 people).

== Demographics ==
=== Historical population ===
- 1961: 4,669
- 1971: 4,531
- 1981: 4,668
- 1991: 4,517
- 2002: 5,137
- 2011: 5,042
- 2022: 4,621

=== Ethnic groups ===
According to data from the 2022 census, ethnic groups in the village include:

- 3,169 (68.5%) Serbs
- 1,671 (18.1%) Rusyns
- Others/Undeclared/Unknown

== See also ==
- List of places in Serbia
- List of cities, towns and villages in Vojvodina
