= Ján Eugen Kočiš =

Slovak-Czech bishop

- Titular Bishop of Abrittum, Auxiliary Bishop of Ruthenian Catholic Apostolic Exarchate of Czech Republic
- Church: Ruthenian Greek Catholic Church
- Appointed: 24 April 2004
- Term ended: 7 October 2006
- Other post: Protosyncellus of Ruthenian Catholic Apostolic Exarchate of Czech Republic (1996–2006)

Orders
- Ordination: 1 January 1951 (Priest) by Robert Pobožný
- Consecration: 15 May 2004 (Bishop) by Đura Džudžar

Personal details
- Born: 25 June 1926 Pozdišovce, Czechoslovakia
- Died: 4 December 2019 (aged 93) Prešov, Slovakia

Bishop Ján Eugen Kočiš (25 June 1926 – 4 December 2019) was a Slovak-Czech Ruthenian Greek Catholic hierarch, who served as a titular bishop of Abrittum and an auxiliary bishop of the Ruthenian Catholic Apostolic Exarchate of Czech Republic from 24 April 2004 until 7 October 2006.

== Life ==
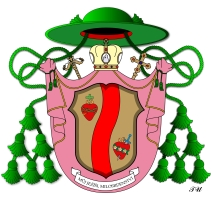
Coat of arms of Bishop Ján Eugen Kočiš

Bishop Kočiš was born as a youngest child among 8 children in the Greek-Catholic family of Juraj Kočiš in Pozdišovce, Czechoslovakia (today eastern Slovakia), but he grew up in Trebišov. After his graduation of school education, he completed his study as the teacher in the Pedagogical College in Michalovce (1942–1946) and worked in this profession a one year in Malá Tŕňa.

In 1947 he joined the Theological Seminary in Prešov, where he studied until prohibition of the Greek-Catholic Church in Czechoslovakia in 1950 and the beginning of religion persecution. Kočiš was clandestinely ordained as a priest on 1 January 1951, a short time before his was forced to make a compulsory service in the military camps for forced labour (1951–1953).

After ordination he served as a clandestine priest, but officially worked as a baker, excavator driver, worker, until his arrest and imprisonment in 1958 by the Communist Czechoslovak State Security for four years. Then he was released, but with prohibition to live in Slovakia and remained in the Czech Republic. In this time, on 3 December 1967, he was clandestine consecrated to the Episcopate by Felix Maria Davídek (but this consecration, among others, made by this bishop, wasn't recognised by the Holy See).

With The Prague Spring and a period of political liberalization in Czechoslovakia, Msgr. Kočiš returned to an active pastoral service as a close cooperator to Ján Hirka. Also from 1991 until 1993 he served as a parish priest in Ďurďoš. In January 1993, he was appointed as a vicar for the Greek-Catholics in the Czech Republic with the residence in Prague and with the creation of the Ruthenian Catholic Apostolic Exarchate of Czech Republic in 1996, he became a Protosyncellus of this ecclesiastical structure.

On 24 April 2004 Msgr. Kočiš was appointed and on 15 May 2004 was consecrated "sub conditione" to the episcopate as an auxiliary bishop of the Ruthenian Catholic Apostolic Exarchate of Czech Republic and the titular bishop of Abrittum. The principal consecrator was Bishop Đura Džudžar.

After his retirement in 2006 he returned to his native Slovakia and resided in Prešov. He died on 4 December 2019.

Catholic Church titles
Preceded by Fylymon Kurchaba	Titular Bishop of Abrittum; 2004–2019	Succeeded by Călin Ioan Bot
