= List of English landscape gardens =

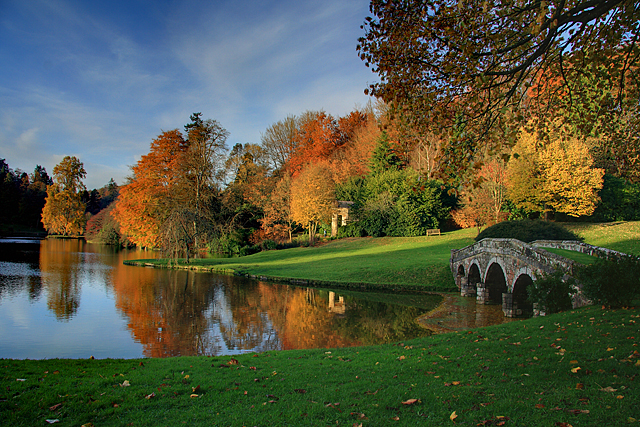
Landscape garden

This is a list of notable English landscape gardens.

== Austria ==
- The palace gardens of Schloss Eggenberg (Graz)

== Belgium ==
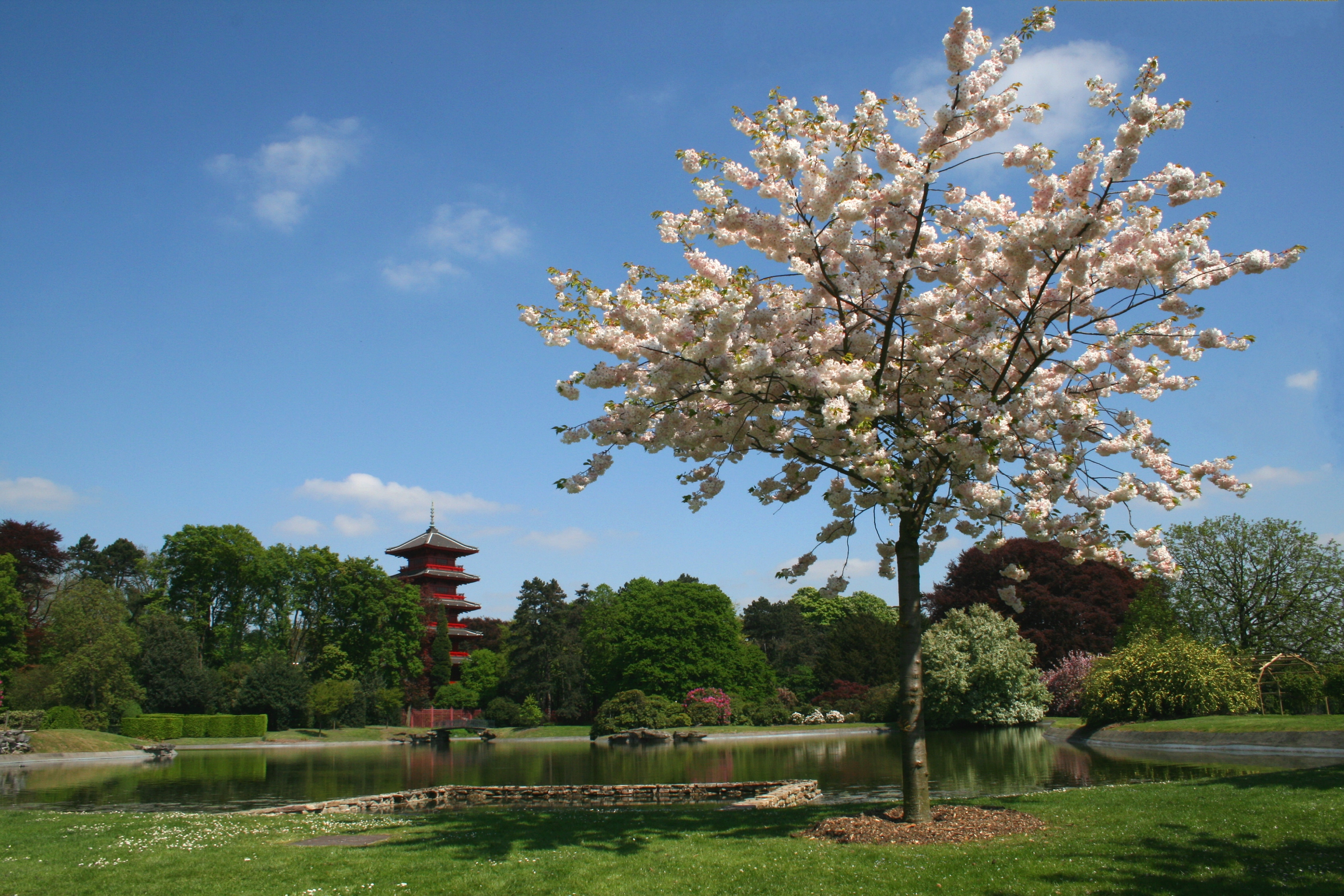
Royal Castle of Laeken

- Royal Garden, Royal Castle of Laeken.
- Castle gardens of Hof ter Saksen, Beveren-Waas
- Citadelpark in Ghent
- The Nationale Plantentuin of Belgium

== Czech Republic ==
- Lednice–Valtice Cultural Landscape in Lednice and Valtice, a UNESCO World Heritage Site
- Krásný Dvůr Castle in Krásný Dvůr
- Kynžvart Castle in Lázně Kynžvart

== Denmark ==
- Liselund on the Island of Møn

== France ==
- see French landscape garden

== Germany ==
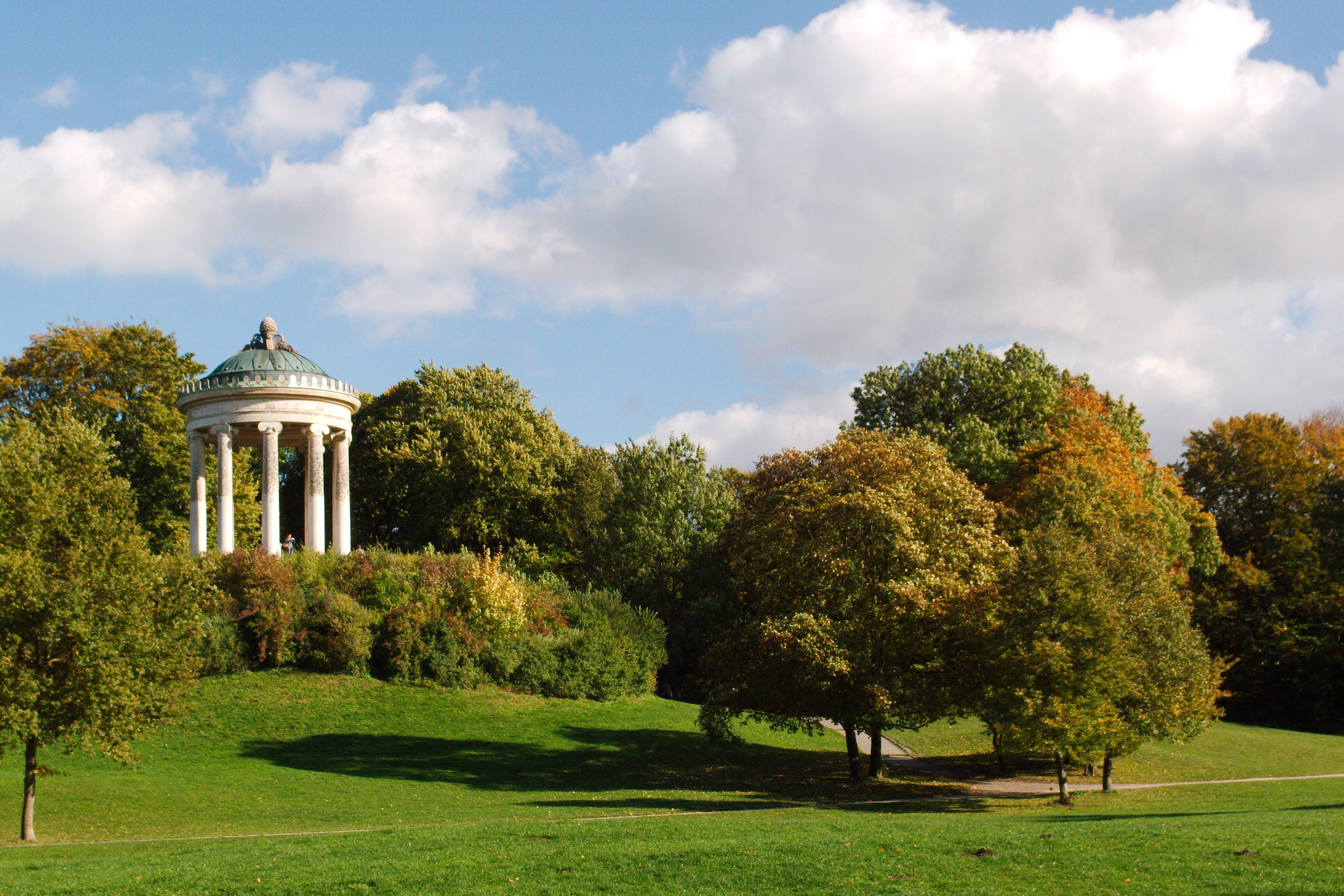
The monopteros in the Munich Englischer Garten

- Englischer Garten ("English Garden") in Munich
- English Grounds of Wörlitz, Wörlitz
- Park von Muskau (now partly in Poland)
- Wilhelmshöhe, Kassel
- Nymphenburg, Munich (formal garden transformed to landscape garden)
- Schwetzingen Garden, Schwetzingen (combined formal / landscape garden)
- Park Schönbusch or "Bois-Jolie", Aschaffenburg
- Branitzer Park, Cottbus
- Jenischpark in Hamburg
- Park Glienicke, Berlin-Wannsee
- Nerotalanlagen in Wiesbaden

== Hungary ==
- Margitsziget, Budapest
- Mikosdpuszta
- Városliget, Budapest

== Italy ==
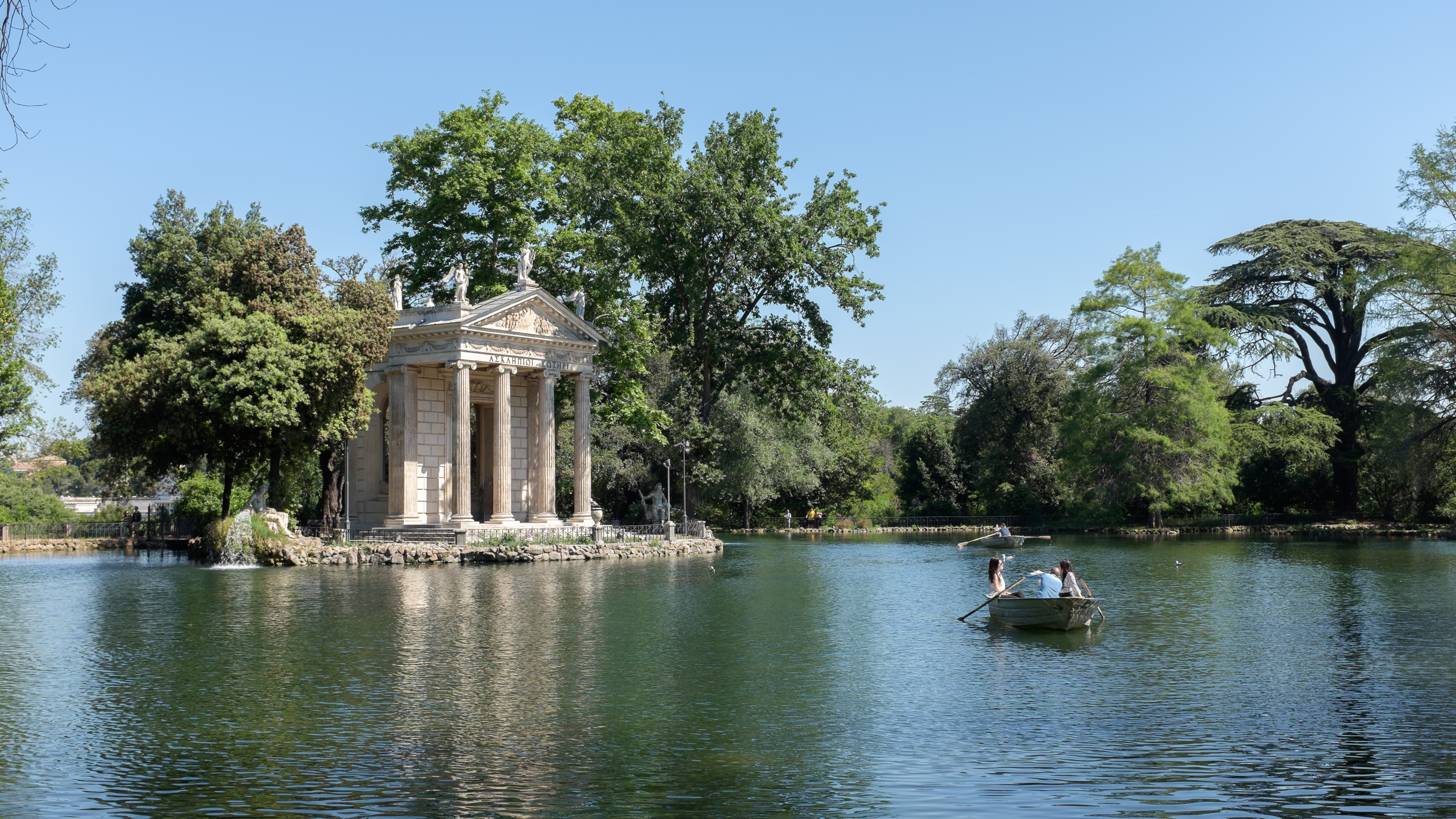
Villa Borghese gardens, Rome

- Boboli Gardens, Florencee
- Villa Borghese gardens, Rome
- Villa Doria Pamphili, Rome
- Villa d'Este, Tivoli
- Giardino all'inglese at Royal Palace of Caserta

== Netherlands ==
- The garden of Epemastate
- Wilhelminapark (Utrecht) in Utrecht
- Sarphatipark in Amsterdam
- Vondelpark in Amsterdam

== Poland ==
- Saxon Garden, Warsaw

== Russia ==
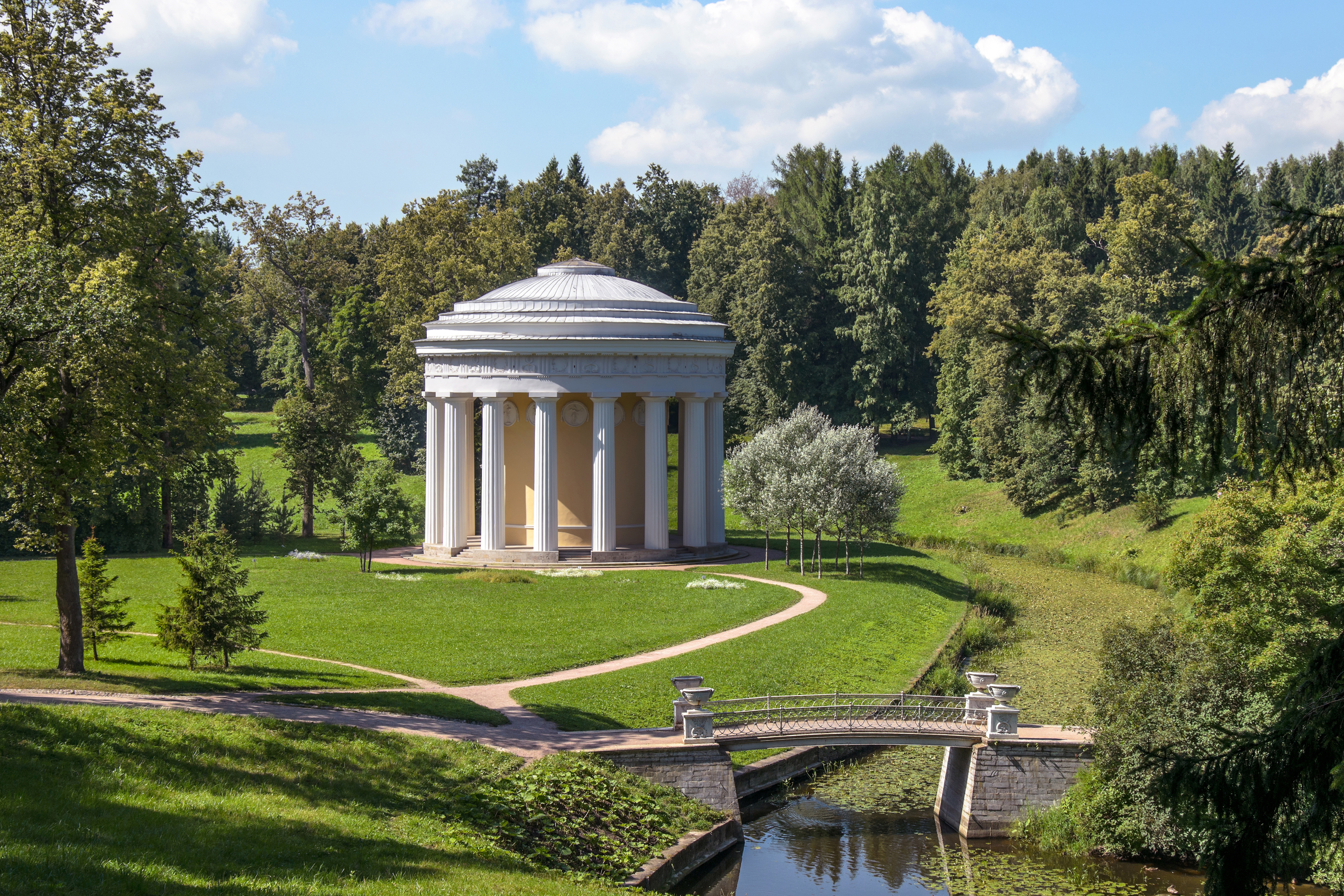
The "Temple of Friendship" in Pavlovsk Park (1780)

- Pavlovsk Park
- Alexander Park in Tsarskoe Selo
- Mon Repos, Vyborg

== Spain ==
- Los jardines del Buen Retiro, Madrid
- Parque de El Capricho, Madrid
- Jardín del Príncipe at Real Sitio de Aranjuez, Aranjuez

== Sweden ==
- Drottningholm Palace, Lovön
- Bellevue, Stockholm
- Haga Park, Solna

== Ukraine ==
- Sofiyivka Park, Uman

== United Kingdom ==
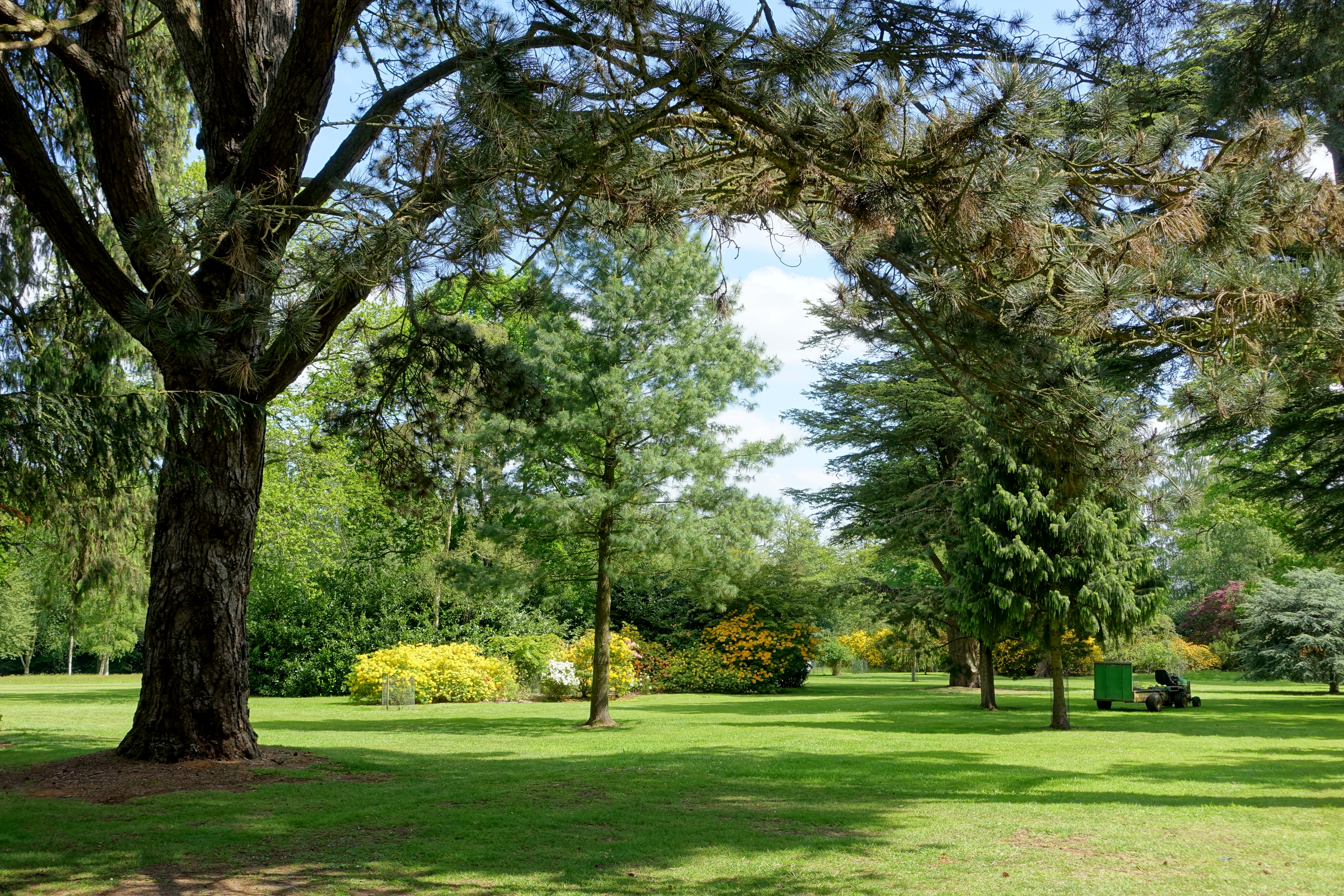
Pinetum at Bowood House

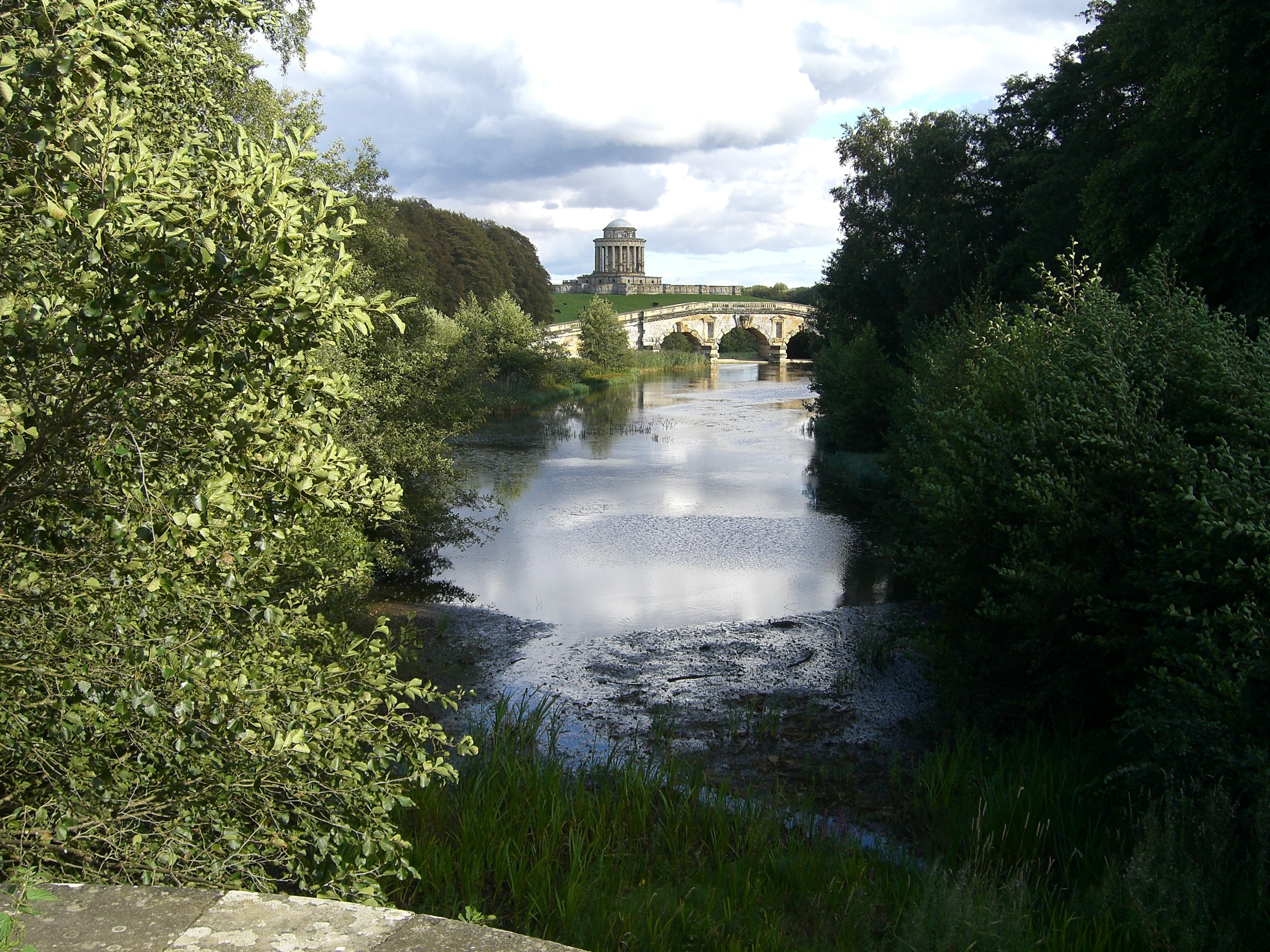
Bridge and mausoleum at Castle Howard

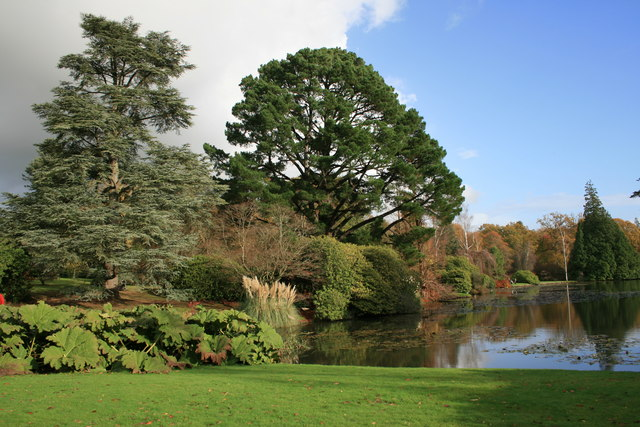
Sheffield Park Garden

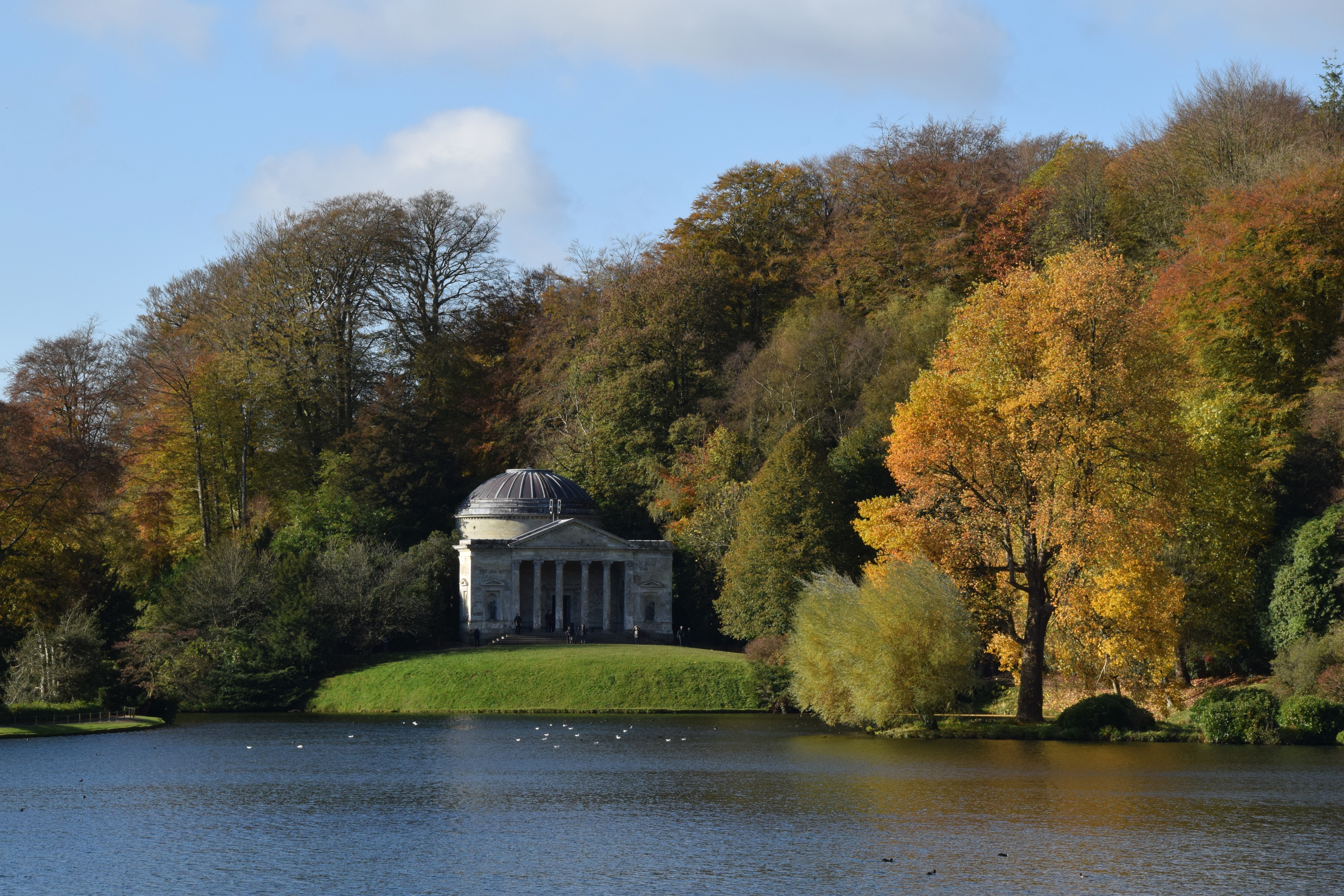
Eyecatching pantheon at Stourhead estate

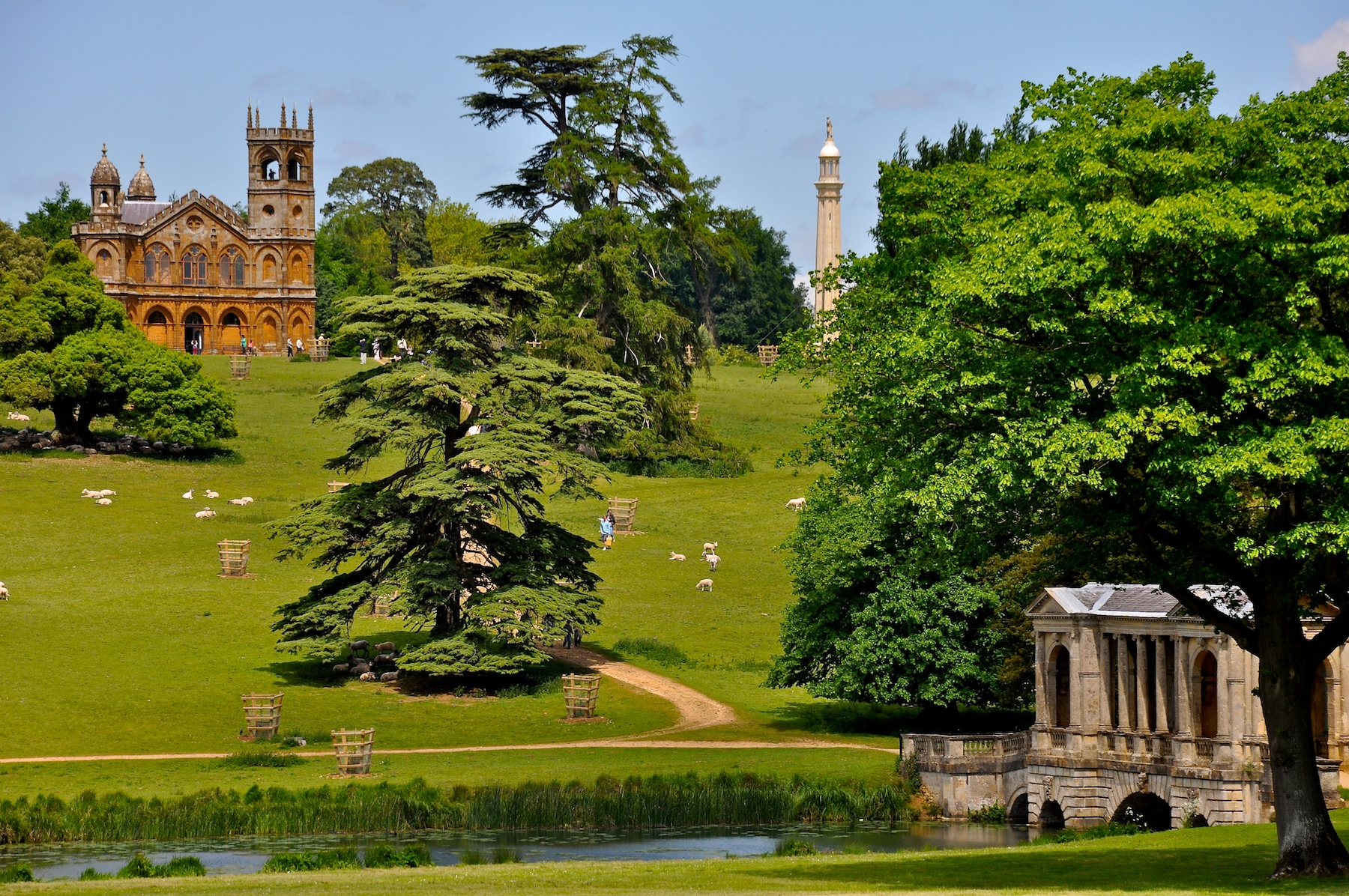
Hawkwell Field with Gothic temple, Cobham monument and Palladian bridge at Stowe House

- Attingham Park, Shropshire
- Berrington Hall, Herefordshire
- Blenheim Palace, Oxfordshire
- Bowood House, Wiltshire
- Bramham Park, West Yorkshire
- Buckingham Palace Garden, London
- Castle Howard, Yorkshire
- Chatsworth House, Derbyshire
- Chiswick House, London
- Cirencester Park, Gloucestershire
- Claremont Landscape Garden, Surrey
- Cliveden, Buckinghamshire
- Croome Park, Worcestershire
- Farnborough Park, Warwickshire
- Gibside, County Durham
- Hafod Uchtryd, Ceredigion
- Hagley Hall, Worcestershire
- Harcourt Arboretum, Oxfordshire
- Hawkstone Park, Shropshire
- Heaton Park, Manchester
- Hestercombe House, Somerset
- Highclere Castle, Hampshire
- Holkham Hall, Norfolk
- Kedleston Hall, Derbyshire
- Kew Gardens, London
- The Leasowes, Shropshire
- Margam Country Park, Neath
- Middleton Hall (National Botanic Garden of Wales), Carmarthenshire
- Mount Edgcumbe Country Park, Cornwall
- Newton Park, Cornwall
- Nostell Priory, Yorkshire
- Painshill Park, Surrey
- Painswick Rococo Garden, Gloucestershire
- Petworth House, West Sussex
- Piercefield House, Monmouthshire
- Prior Park Landscape Garden, Bath
- Rousham House, Oxfordshire
- Sheffield Park, East Sussex
- Sheringham Park, Norfolk
- Shugborough Hall, Staffordshire
- Stackpole Estate, Pembrokeshire
- Stourhead, Wiltshire
- Studley Royal, Yorkshire
- Stowe Gardens, Buckinghamshire
- Tatton Park, Cheshire
- Trentham Gardens, Staffordshire
- Virginia Water Lake, Windsor Great Park, Surrey
- Wentworth Castle, Yorkshire
- Wentworth Woodhouse, Yorkshire
- West Wycombe Park, Buckinghamshire
- Wilton House, Wiltshire
- Wimpole Hall, Cambridgeshire
- Wrest Park, Bedfordshire

== United States ==
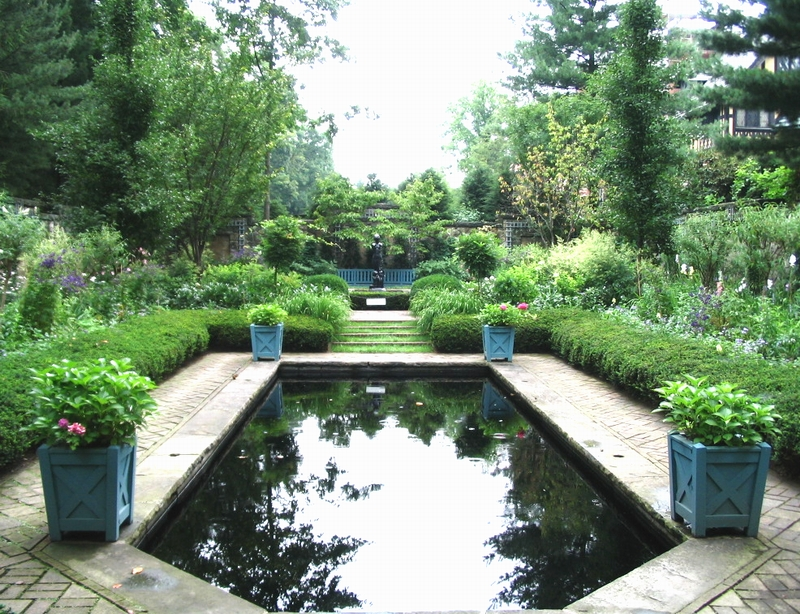
The English Garden at Stan Hywet Hall and Gardens. Designed by Warren H. Manning, this garden was redesigned by Ellen Biddle Shipman in the late 1920s, and restored in the early 1990s. It is one of the few restored Shipman gardens open to the public in the United States.

- Agecroft Hall, Richmond, Virginia - a rare 15th-century Tudor manor house dismantled in Lancashire, England, shipped and reconstructed in the USA that contains an example of an Elizabethan Knot Garden
- Biltmore Estate, Asheville, North Carolina
- Filoli, Woodside, California
- Mount Vernon, Fairfax County, Virginia
- Monticello, Charlottesville, Virginia
- Middleton Place, Charleston, South Carolina
- Bartram's Garden, Philadelphia, Pennsylvania - oldest botanic garden in North America, founded in 1728, containing a walled English garden
- Stan Hywet Hall and Gardens, Akron, Ohio
- Edsel and Eleanor Ford House, Grosse Point Shores, Michigan
