= St. Clement's Cathedral, Prague =

St. Clement's Cathedral
- Katedrála sv. Klimenta
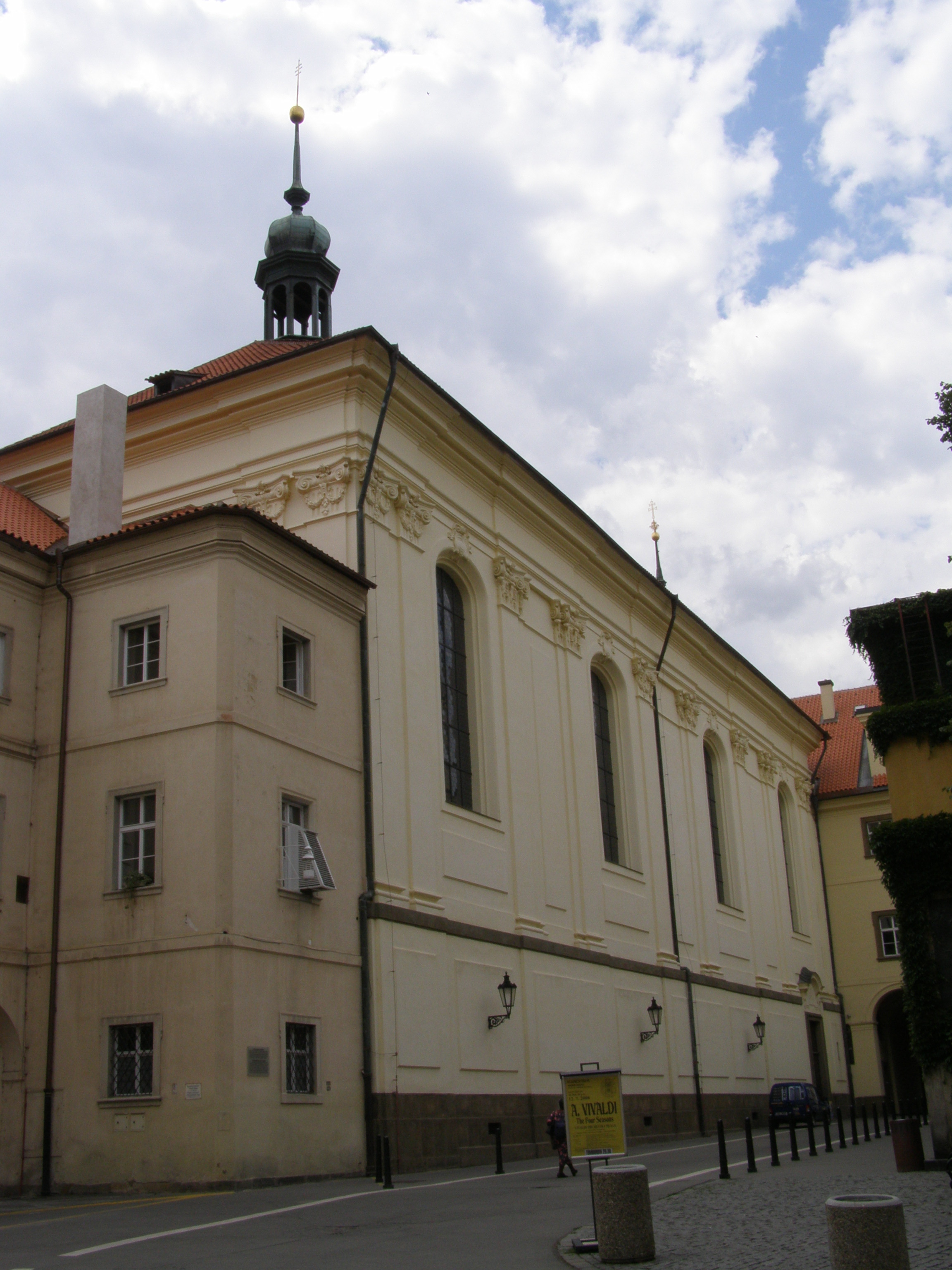
- St. Clement's Cathedral
- 50.0861°N 14.4150°E
- Location: Prague
- Country: Czech Republic
- Denomination: Catholic Church (Byzantine Rite)

St. Clement's Cathedral (Czech: Katedrála sv. Klimenta) also known as the Church of St. Clement or St. Kliment, is a Ruthenian Byzantine Catholic church located in Prague, Czech Republic, and functions as the cathedral of the Ruthenian Catholic Apostolic Exarchate of Czech Republic (Exarchatus Apostolicus Reipublicae Cechae). The church was erected as a cathedral with the Bull "Quo aptius" by Pope John Paul II of March 13, 1996, which established the Exarchate of the Czech Republic.

== Description ==
The single-nave Baroque church was built for the Jesuits in the Clementinum area between 1711 and 1715. It was designed by František Kaňka and built by Antonio Lurago on the site of an older Gothic church, where the Dominicans in 1227 founded their monastery, and which was destroyed by Hussites in 1420. The Italian Chapel, or the Chapel of the Virgin, was built above the church of St. Clement, between 1590 and 1600, for the Catholic Italian inhabitants.

The interior of the church is richly decorated, with statues of the Fathers of the Church and the Four Evangelists placed in niches in the walls, the work of Matthias Braun. The main altar is decorated with a painting by Josef Kramolín. The original iconostasis was replaced by a new one in 1984.

== See also ==
- Catholic Church in the Czech Republic
