= Ladislav Hučko =

Slovak Ruthenian Greek Catholic bishop (1948–2025)

The Right Reverend Ladislav Hučko
- Titular Bishop of Horaea
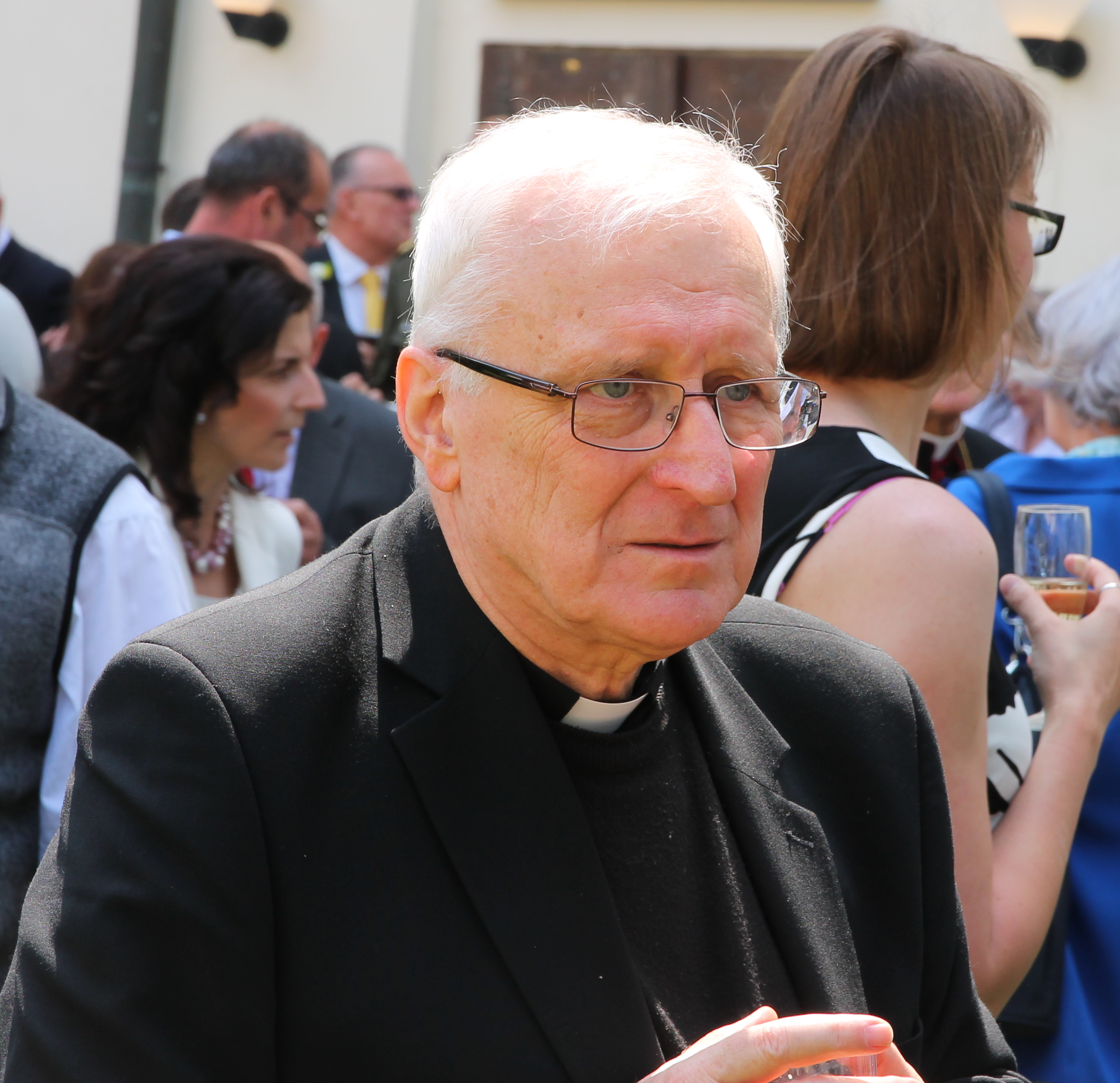
- Hučko in 2018
- Church: Ruthenian Greek Catholic Church
- Diocese: Apostolic Exarchate in the Czech Republic
- See: Titular See of Horaea
- In office: 2003–2025
- Predecessor: Atilano Rodríguez Martínez
- Successor: incumbent

Orders
- Ordination: 30 March 1996 by Slavomir Miklovš
- Consecration: 31 May 2003 by Đura Džudžar

Personal details
- Born: 16 February 1948 Prešov, Czechoslovakia (now Slovakia)
- Died: 14 January 2025 (aged 76) Prague, Czech Republic
- Coat of arms

Ladislav Hučko (16 February 1948 – 14 January 2025) was a Slovak hierarch of the Ruthenian Greek Catholic Church, Apostolic Exarch of the Czech Republic (2003–2025).

== Biography ==
Hučko was born in Prešov, Czechoslovakia (now in Slovakia) and was ordained a priest on 30 March 1996. Hučko was appointed titular bishop of Horaea as well as Apostolic Exarch of the Apostolic Exarchate of the Greek Catholic Church in the Czech Republic on 24 April 2003 and ordained a bishop on 31 May 2003.

He completed his studies by obtaining a doctorate from the Pontifical Lateran University in 2000. In 2004 he became Associate Professor of Dogmatic Theology. Subsequently, he began teaching dogmatic theology at the Theological Institute in Košice. He also became a founding member and editor-in-chief of the journal Verba Theologica. He also worked as a Spiritualist at St. Charles Borromeo Seminary in Košice.

Hučko died in Prague on 14 January 2025, at the age of 76.
