= Apostolic Exarchate of the Greek Catholic Church in the Czech Republic =

Eastern Catholic jurisdiction in Czechia

Apostolic Exarchate of the Czech Republic Exarchatus Apostolicus Reipublicae Cechae Apoštolský exarchát v České republice
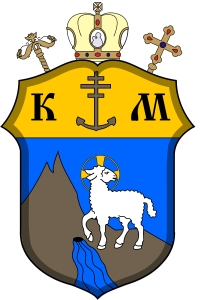
- Coat of arms

Location
- Country: Czech Republic
- Metropolitan: Immediately Subject to the Holy See
- Population: (as of 2013); 17,000

Information
- Sui iuris church: Ruthenian Greek Catholic Church
- Rite: Byzantine Rite
- Established: 18 January 1996
- Cathedral: St. Clement's Cathedral, Prague

Current leadership
- Pope: Leo XIV
- Bishop: Sede vacante

Website
- www.exarchat.cz

The Apostolic Exarchate of the Greek Catholic Church in the Czech Republic is an exarchate of the Ruthenian Greek Catholic Church that was erected by Pope John Paul II on 13 March 1996. Also following the 1989 Velvet Revolution, the married men secretly and irregularly ordained as Roman Catholic priests by underground bishop Felix Maria Davídek were ordered by Pope John Paul II to submit to conditional re-ordination followed by their permanent liturgical transfer to the Byzantine Rite Exarchate.

The Exarchate's geographic remit includes the Czech Republic. As an Eastern Catholic Church, it is in full communion with the Catholic Church. The exarchate is exempt, which means that it does have a metropolitan bishop but is directly subject to the Holy See and is supervised by the Roman Dicastery for the Eastern Churches, a Roman Curia dicastery acting on behalf of the Pope. Its parishes follow the Byzantine Rite, which is also celebrated by the majority of Orthodox Christians. The episcopal seat is the Cathedral of St. Clement in the city of Prague.

== Structure ==
The church was built on territory previously covered by a Byzantine Rite metropolis — the Slovak Catholic Metropolitan Archeparchy of Prešov.

An exarchate is the initial stage of an eparchy (the equivalent of a diocese in the Latin rites), which is exempt (i.e. not part of an ecclesiastical province but directly subject to the Holy See). The exarchate is governed by a bishop who has the same rights as a diocesan bishop.

According to the 2011 census, there were 9,927 Byzantine Catholics in the Czech Republic. In July 2016 according to the Statistics from the Annuario Pontificio 2016 compiled by Ron Roberson there is a combined Byzantine or Constantinopolitan Tradition (“Greek Catholic”) count of 7,677,373 for which the Ruthenian Apostolic Exarchate in the Czech Republic in Prague makes up 17,000 of. Currently there are 20 parishes and 12 chapels organized into seven deaneries and served by 25 priests.

Additionally, significant proportion of believers are workers and refugees from Ukraine.

== List of Apostolic Exarchs ==
The following is a list of the hierarchs of the Apostolic Exarchate and their terms of service:

- Ivan Ljavinec, Titular Bishop of Acalissus (18 January 1996 – 23 April 2003)
- Ladislav Hučko, Titular Bishop of Horæa (24 April 2003 – 14 January 2025), also Secretary General of the Czech Bishops’ Conference (2005 – 2011.07.01)
  - Ján Eugen Kočiš, Auxiliary Bishop, Titular Bishop of Abrittum (24 April 2004 – October 7, 2006)

== See also ==
- List of Catholic dioceses (structured view)
- Metropolis of Pittsburgh (Ruthenian Greek Catholic Church), the only province of the Ruthenian Greek Catholic that is located in North America

== Sources and external links ==
- GigaCatholic.org, with incumbent biography links
- Apoštolský exarchát řeckokatolické církve v České republice (Czech language)
- Profile at catholic-hierarchy.org
