= Krásný Dvůr =

- Municipality
- Centre of Krásný Dvůr

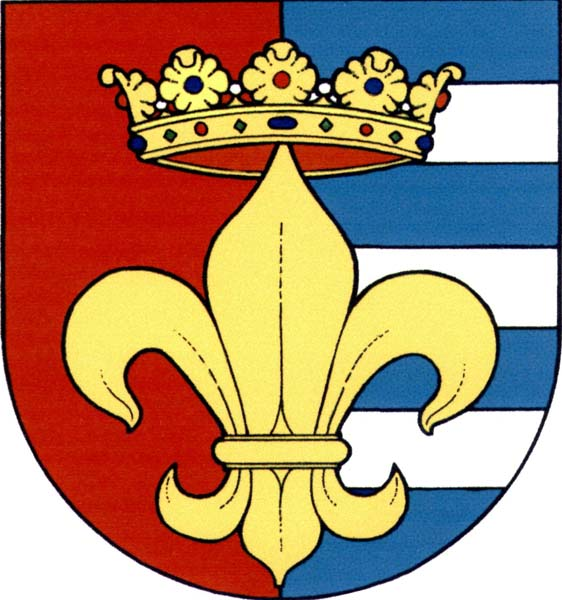
- Flag Coat of arms

- Location in the Czech Republic
- Coordinates: 50°15′15″N 13°22′4″E
- Country: Czech Republic
- Region: Ústí nad Labem
- District: Louny
- First mentioned: 1295

Area
  - Total: 25.21 km^{2} (9.73 sq mi)
- Elevation: 291 m (955 ft)

Population (2026-01-01)
  - Total: 630
  - Density: 25/km^{2} (65/sq mi)
- Time zone: UTC+1 (CET)
  - Summer (DST): UTC+2 (CEST)
- Postal codes: 439 72, 441 01
- Website: www.obeckrasnydvur.cz

Krásný Dvůr (German: Schönhof) is a municipality and village in Louny District in the Ústí nad Labem Region of the Czech Republic. It has about 600 inhabitants. The municipality is known for the Krásný Dvůr Castle, which is protected as a national cultural monument.

== Administrative division ==
Krásný Dvůr consists of seven municipal parts (in brackets population according to the 2021 census):

- Krásný Dvůr (419)
- Brody (59)
- Chotěbudice (22)
- Chrašťany (59)
- Němčany (35)
- Vysoké Třebušice (26)
- Zlovědice (8)

== Etymology ==
The name Krásný Dvůr means 'beautiful courtyard', 'beautiful farmyard' in Czech.

== Geography ==
Krásný Dvůr is located about 32 kilometres (20 mi) west of Louny and 35 km (22 mi) east of Karlovy Vary. It lies on the border between the Most Basin and Doupov Mountains. The highest point is at 417 m (1,368 ft) above sea level. The Leska Stream flows through the municipality.

== History ==
The first written mention of Krásný Dvůr is from 1295.

== Demographics ==
Historical population

Year	Pop.	±%
1869	2,326	—
1880	2,599	+11.7%
1890	2,481	−4.5%
1900	2,195	−11.5%
1910	2,176	−0.9%

Year	Pop.	±%
1921	2,266	+4.1%
1930	2,025	−10.6%
1950	1,080	−46.7%
1961	1,132	+4.8%
1970	993	−12.3%

Year	Pop.	±%
1980	978	−1.5%
1991	834	−14.7%
2001	718	−13.9%
2011	667	−7.1%
2021	628	−5.8%

Source: Censuses

== Transport ==
Krásný Dvůr is located on the railway line Kadaň–Podbořany, but trains run on it only on weekends and holidays during the period April–October.

== Sights ==
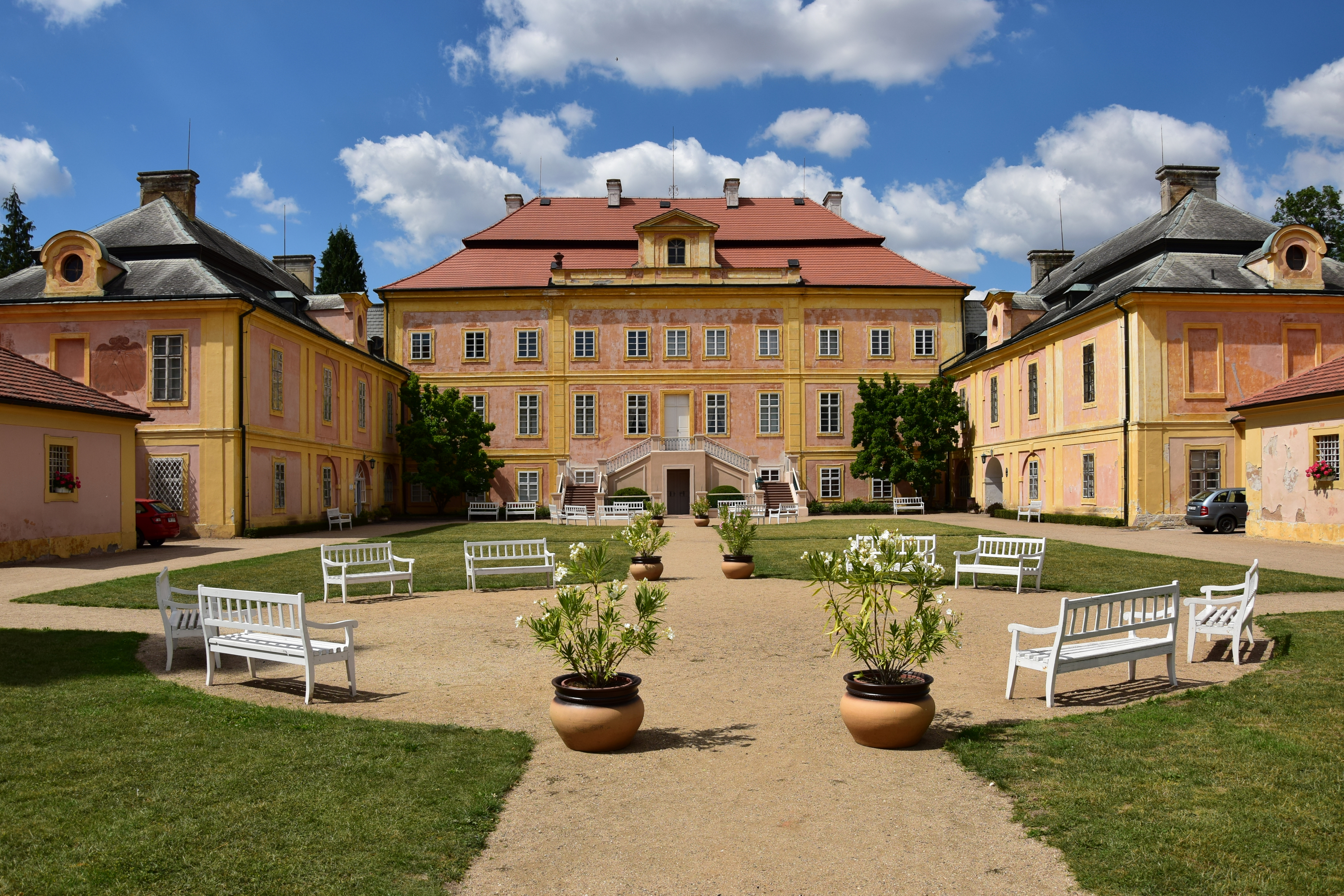
Krásný Dvůr Castle

Krásný Dvůr is known for the Krásný Dvůr Castle. It was originally a Renaissance castle from the 16th century, rebuilt in the Baroque style in the 18th century according to the design by František Maxmilián Kaňka. For its value, it is protected as a national cultural monument.

The Brody Castle is located in Brody. It was built in the Baroque style in the 18th century and rebuilt to its present form in 1848.
