= Karolinum =

- Karolinum
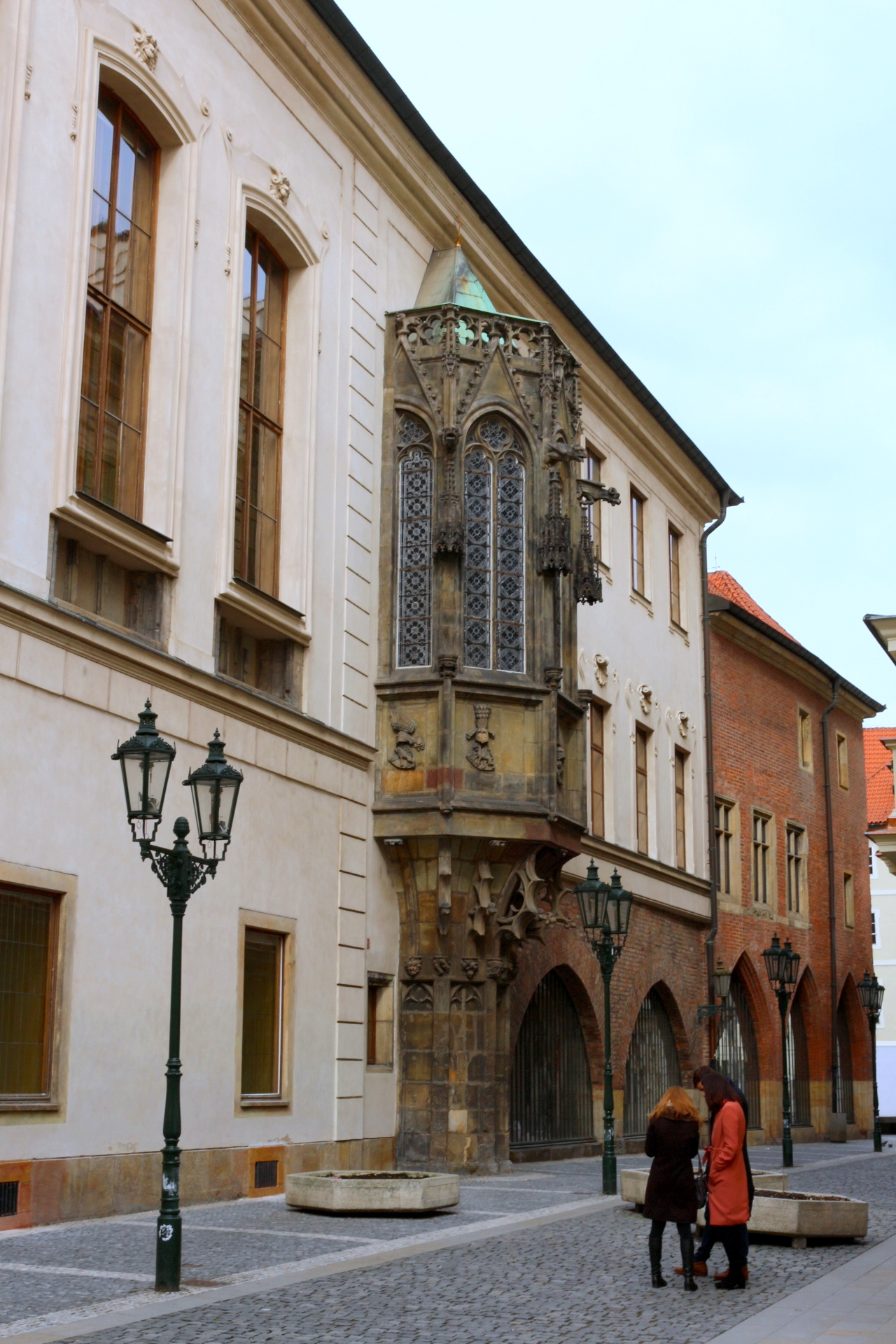
- Interactive map of the Karolinum area

General information
- Location: Old Town, Prague, Ovocný trh 541/3, Czech Republic
- Coordinates: 50°5′10.89″N 14°25′24.19″E

Karolinum (formerly Latin: Collegium Carolinum, in Czech Karlova kolej) is a complex of buildings located in the Old Town of Prague. Karolinum, the seat of the Charles University, is one of the oldest dormitories situated in Central Europe. The dormitory was named after the Emperor Charles IV.

== History ==
Shortly after the establishment of Charles University in 1348, the young institution encountered several organizational problems. One of the major complications was the lack of lecture and accommodation rooms for teachers and students. Emperor Charles IV, apparently inspired by the organization of the Sorbonne college in Paris and by the newly founded universities in Kraków (1364) and Vienna (1365), decided to donate to the school a new college. In 1366, the university received the house of the Jew Lazar, located in the Prague's Old Town. However, the school was given appropriate rooms only in the early 1380s by Wenceslaus, the son of Charles IV. Wenceslaus chose a residence of the wealthy German merchant Johlin (Jan) Rotlev, whose son Martin (a funder of the second oldest German translation of Bible) was closely linked with the court and supported the reformist tendencies of the university. Though it is known that Martin Rotlev inherited the palace, how it passed into the possession of the university remains unknown. The coat of arms of the Rotlev family forms part of the decoration of an oriel window of the college. In addition to the Rotlev Palace, King Wenceslaus also bought the surrounding buildings and rebuilt them for the school.

The architectural shape of Karolinum changed significantly during its history. In the early 18th century, it was rebuilt in Baroque style, according to the plans of the architect František Maxmilián Kaňka. However, the reconstruction was only provisional and the structural condition of the building in the following decades was very bad. In 1786, during a visit in Karolinum, the Emperor Josef II expressed his dissatisfaction with the state of the "seat of muses". It was even planned to sell the building, but in 1802 it was decided that Karolinum would remain in the hands of the Charles University. The decision was apparently influenced by renewed romantic and patriotic enthusiasm (which regarded the historical building as a significant monument for education in Bohemia). From 1879 to 1881, several parts of the building were rebuilt in the Neo-Gothic style by the architect Josef Mocker.

Following World War I and the establishment of the Czechoslovak state, the buildings of Karolinum remained a property of the Charles University. Karolinum is a National Cultural Monument of the Czech Republic.

The official publishing house of Charles University is named Karolinum.

== Gallery ==
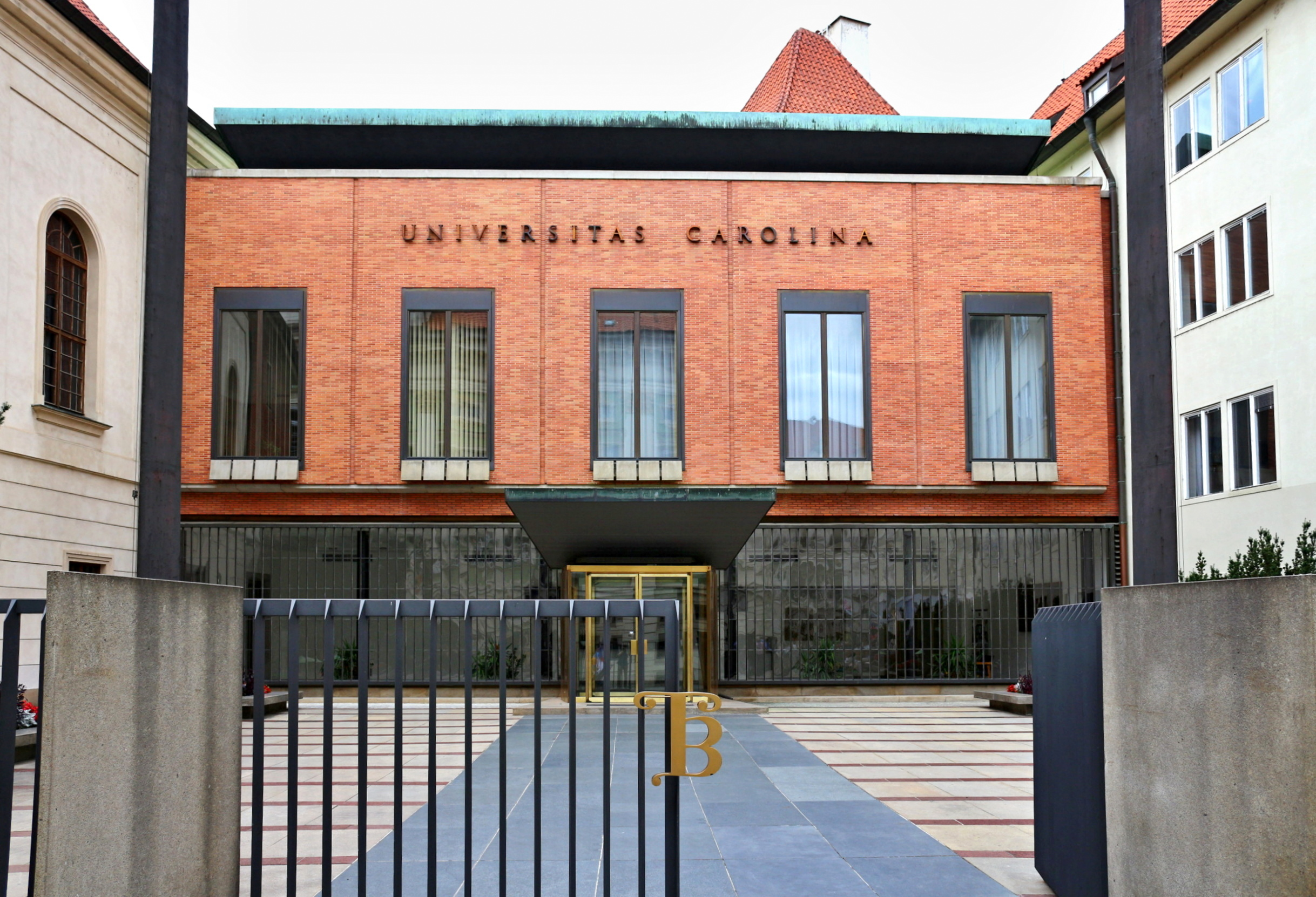
Facade of the aula of the Charles University.

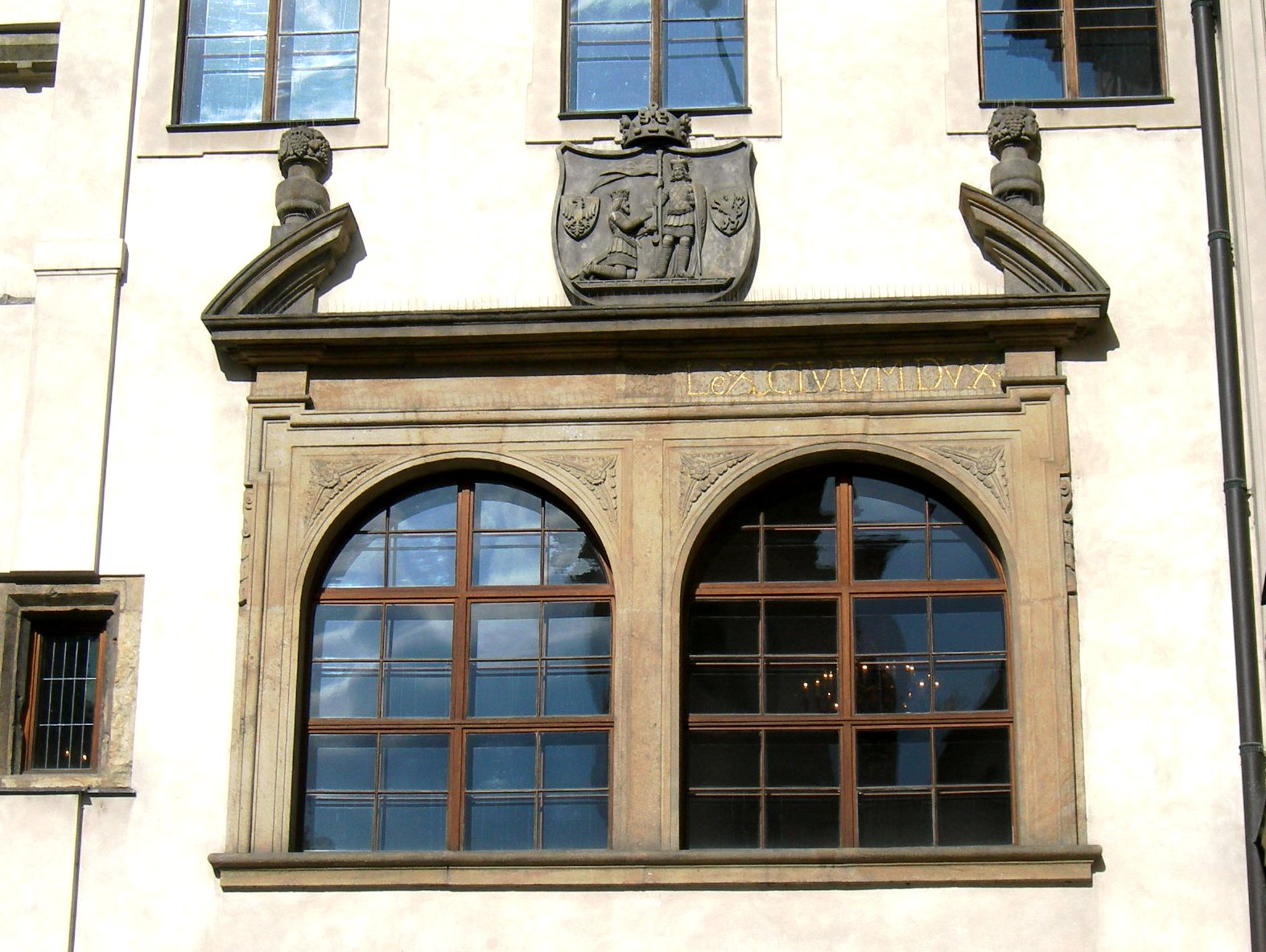
Karolinum, renaissance window.

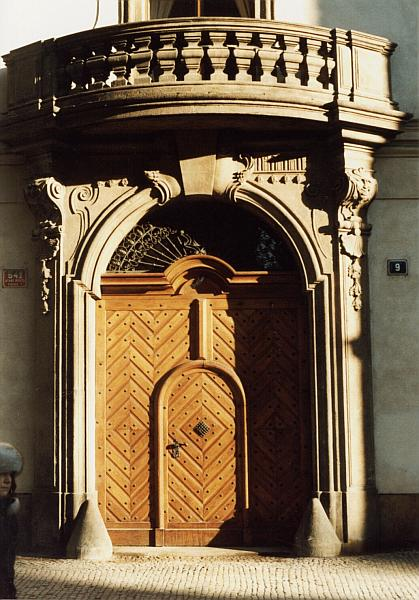
Baroque portal by František Maxmilián Kaňka.

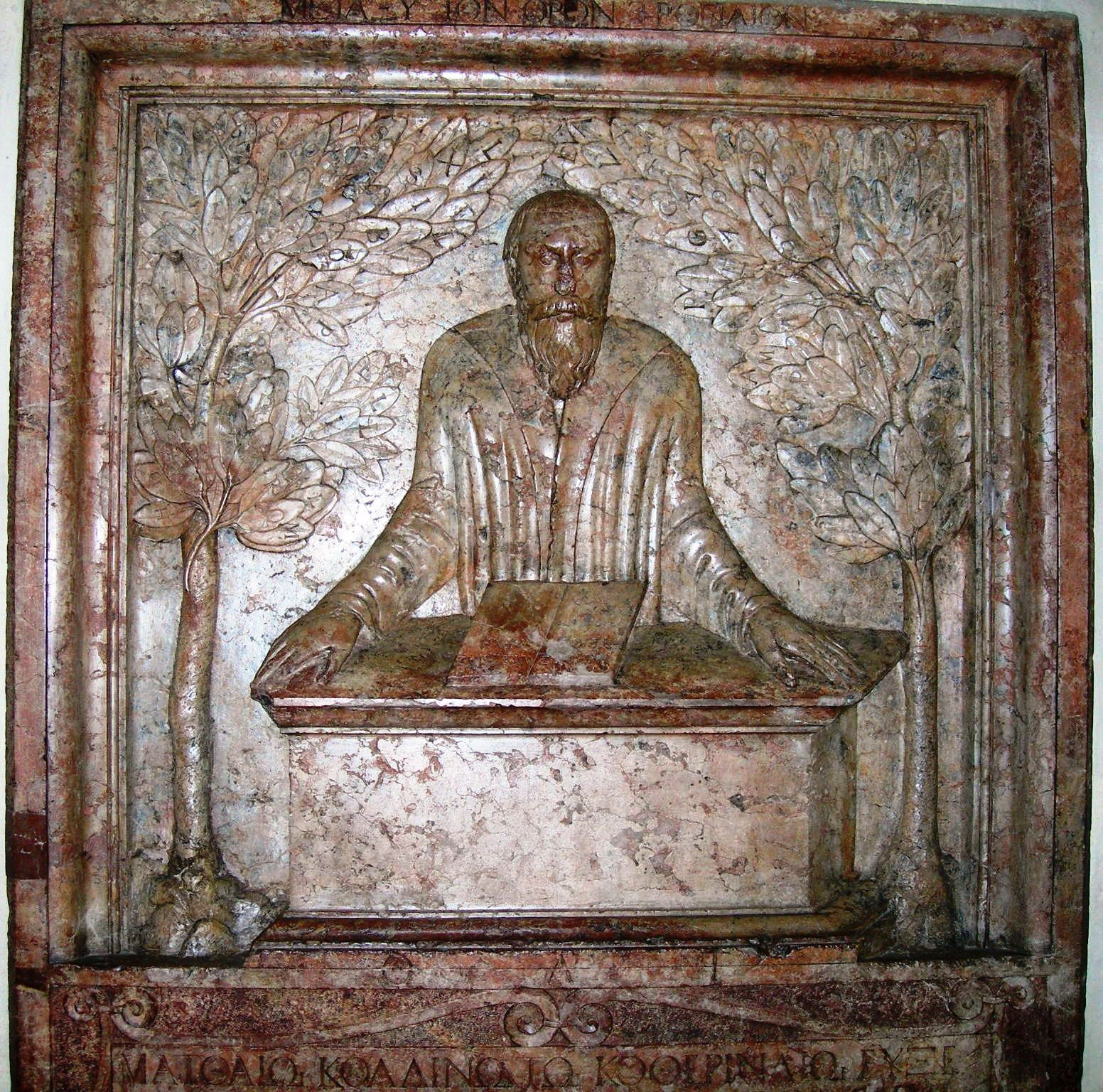
Prague, Karolinum, gravestone of Matthaeus Collinus, 1566.
