= František Maxmilián Kaňka =

Czech architect (1674–1766)

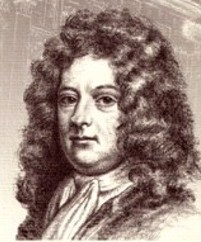
- Born: 19 August 1674; Prague, Bohemia, Habsburg monarchy
- Died: 14 July 1766 (aged 91); Prague, Bohemia, Habsburg monarchy
- Occupation: Architect
- Buildings: Krásný Dvůr Castle; Clementinum; St. Procopius Basilica in Třebíč; Karolinum

František Maxmilián Kaňka (19 August 1674 – 14 July 1766) was a Czech architect. He was among the most important and most prolific Baroque architects in the Czech lands.

== Life ==
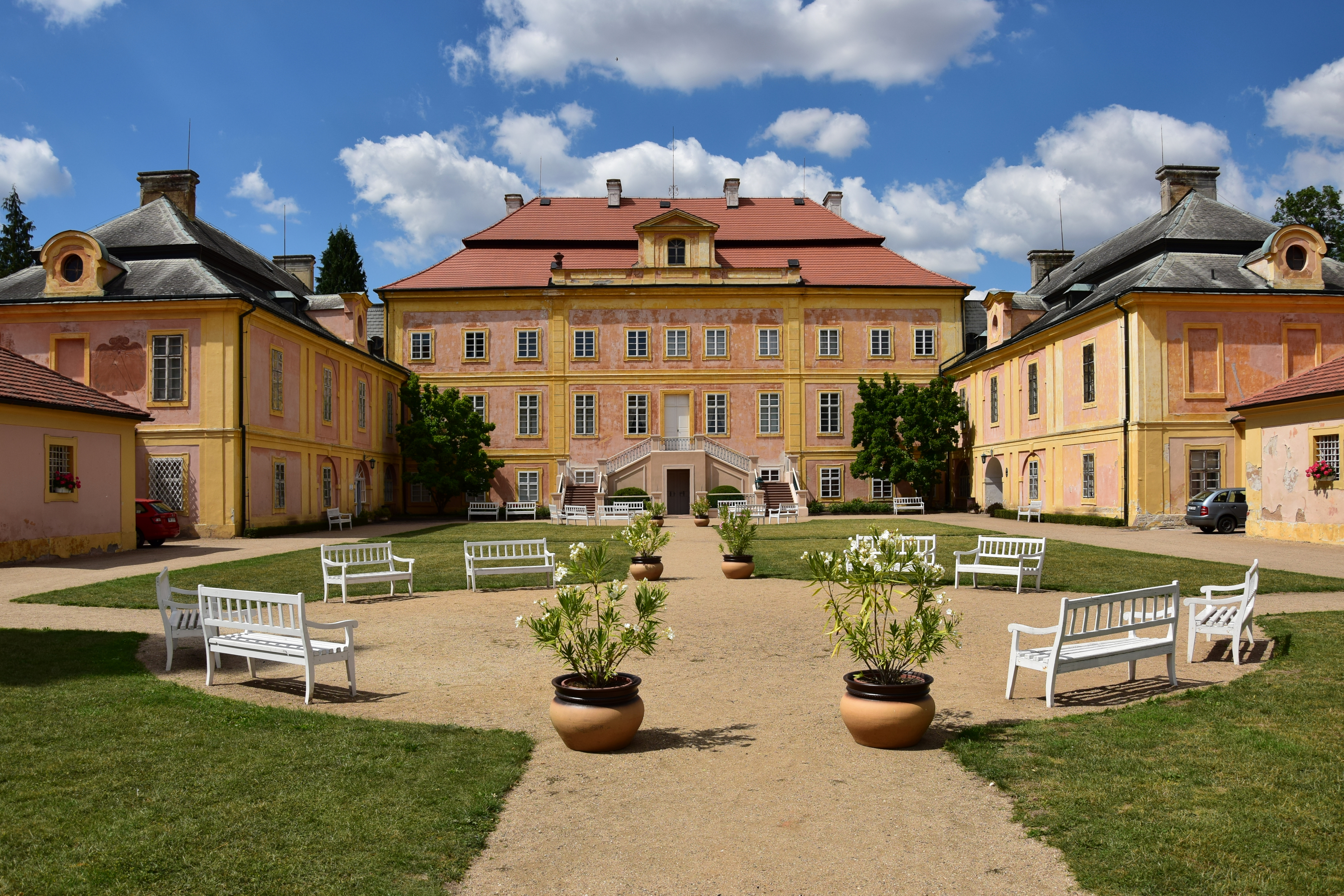
Krásný Dvůr Castle

František Maxmilián Kaňka was born in Prague on 19 August 1674. His father Vít Václav Kaňka was a builder who built the fortifications of New Town of Prague.

Kaňka became an apprentice of Paul Ignaz Bayer. He then lived abroad for a while (in Vienna and probably also in northern Italy). He was married twice. He married a second time at a relatively old age to a much younger wife. From 1733 or 1734, he no longer devoted himself to architecture and became a successful brewer. He was wealthy and had his offspring study law. He died in Prague on 14 July 1766, at the age of 91.

== Work ==
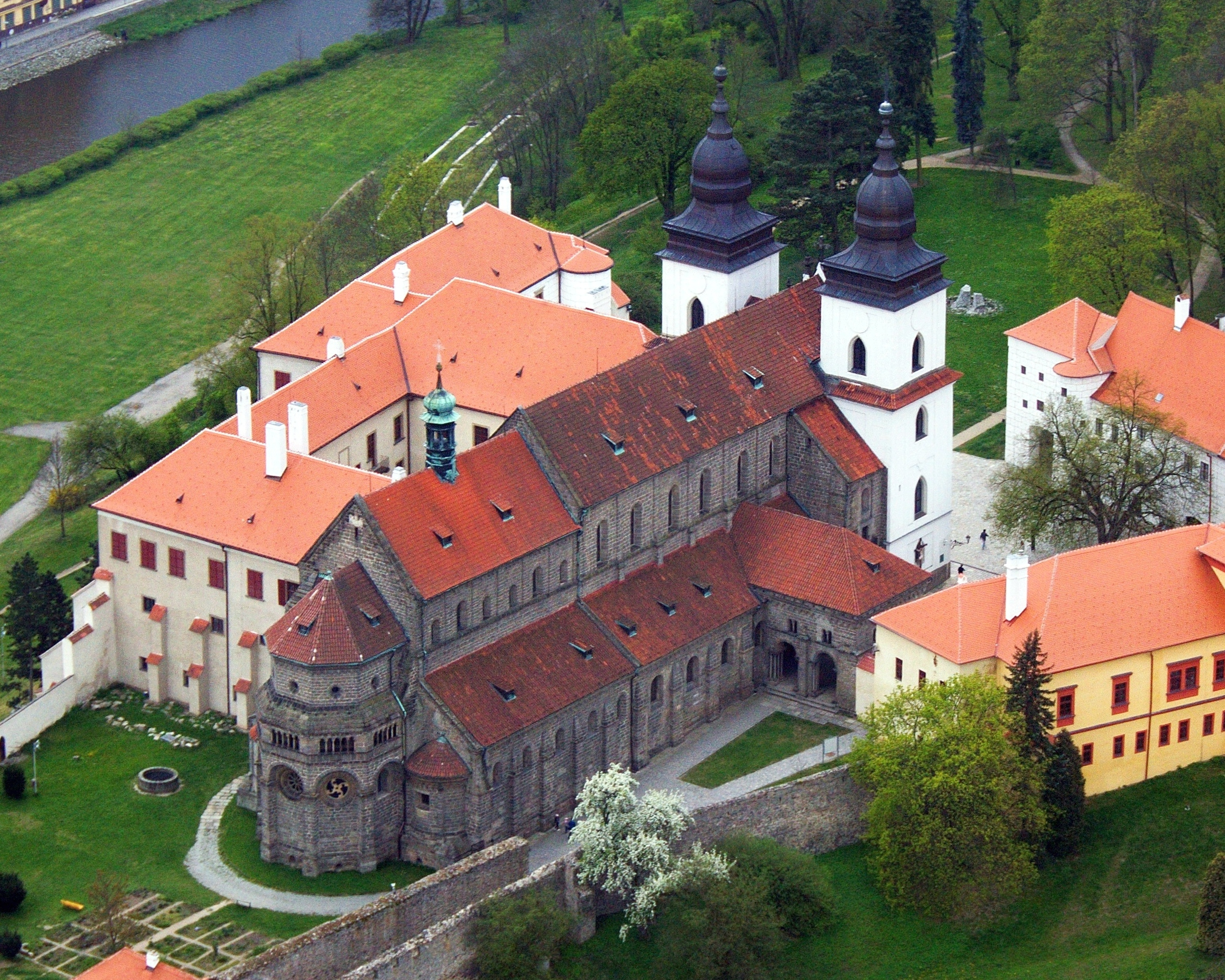
St. Procopius Basilica in Třebíč

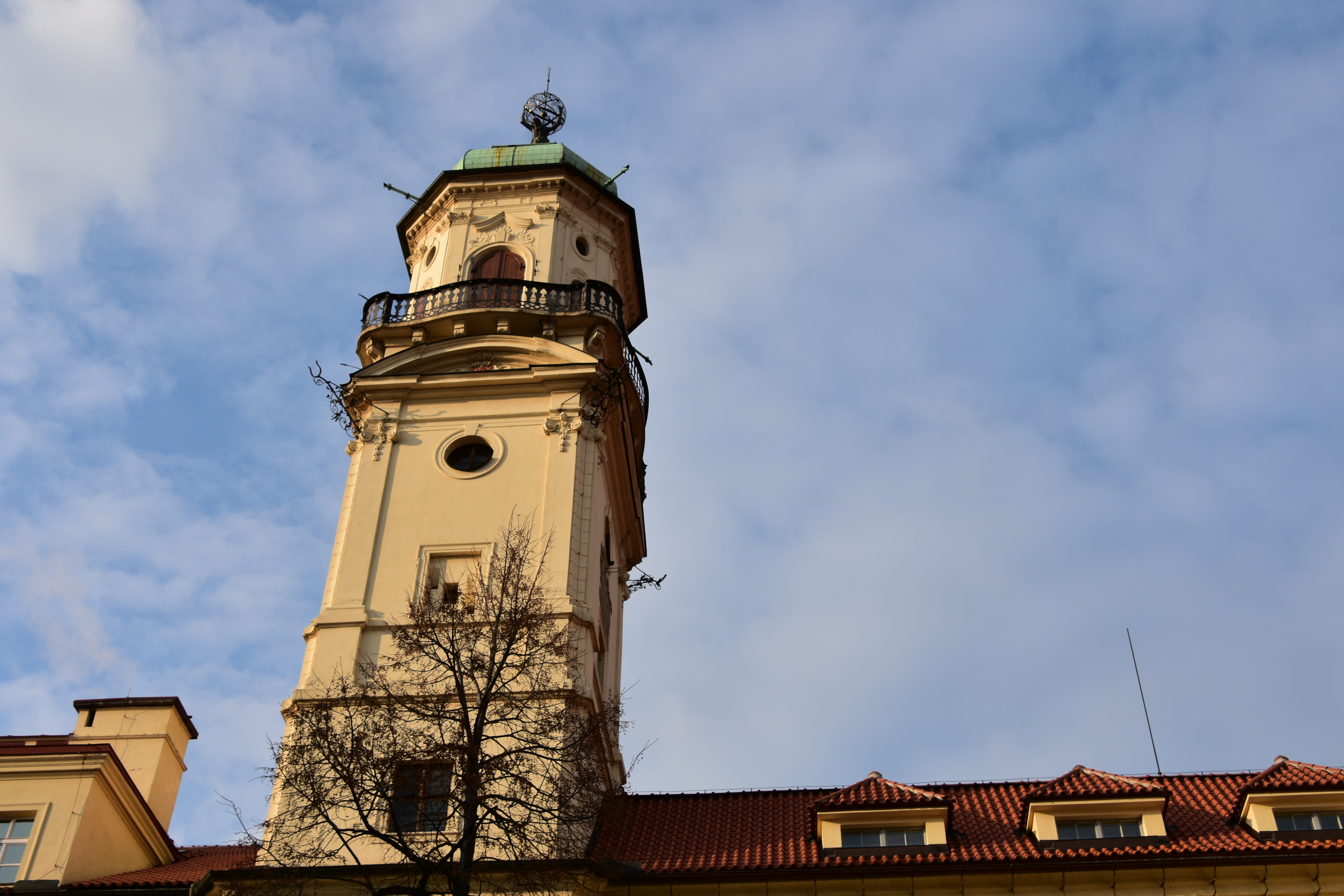
Clementinum Astronomical Tower

After his return from abroad, he collaborated with leading architects of his time such as Giovanni Battista Alliprandi and Jan Santini Aichel. In contrast to other architects, such as Kilian Ignaz Dientzenhofer, he focused mainly on designing buildings and not on their construction. His close friend was the sculptor Matthias Braun, who decorated almost twenty of his buildings (including St. Clement's Cathedral in Clementinum with 190 his sculptures, which is the largest collection of his sculptures). He also ofter collaborated with the painter Wenzel Lorenz Reiner.

In the course of his career, Kaňka worked on castles, palaces and churches, and became especially noteworthy for his reconstructions, redesigns and expansions of existing buildings throughout Bohemia. His services were used by the church and various leading noble families in the Kingdom of Bohemia. He built the most buildings for the Czernin family, and his other customers included the families of Liechtenstein, Vrtba and Mansfeld. In 1723, he was appointed court architect by the Emperor Charles VI.

He is most famous for reconstructions of palaces and castles of Bohemian nobles and for designs of churches and other religious buildings, principally in the Baroque style. His work includes:

- Loučeň castle complex (1704–1713)
- Reconstruction of the Karolinum complex in Prague, the seat of Charles University (1716–1718)
- Reconstruction of Vrtba Palace and Vrtba Garden in Prague (c. 1720)
- Karlova Koruna Chateau (with Jan Santini Aichel) (c. 1720)
- Reconstruction of Krásný Dvůr Castle (c. 1720)
- Astronomical Tower, St. Clement's Cathedral and other structures at the Clementinum in Prague (with Anselmo Lurago, c. 1720)
- Reconstruction of the façade of the St. Procopius Basilica in Třebíč, today protected as a UNESCO World Heritage Site (1725–1733)
- Konopiště Castle (1725)
- Church of St. John of Nepomuk in Kutná Hora (c. 1733)
- Reconstruction of a part of Zbraslav Monastery
- Donaueschingen Palace in Baden-Württemberg, Germany
