= Pozdišovce =

Village and municipality in Slovakia

Pozdišovce Pazdics
- Municipality
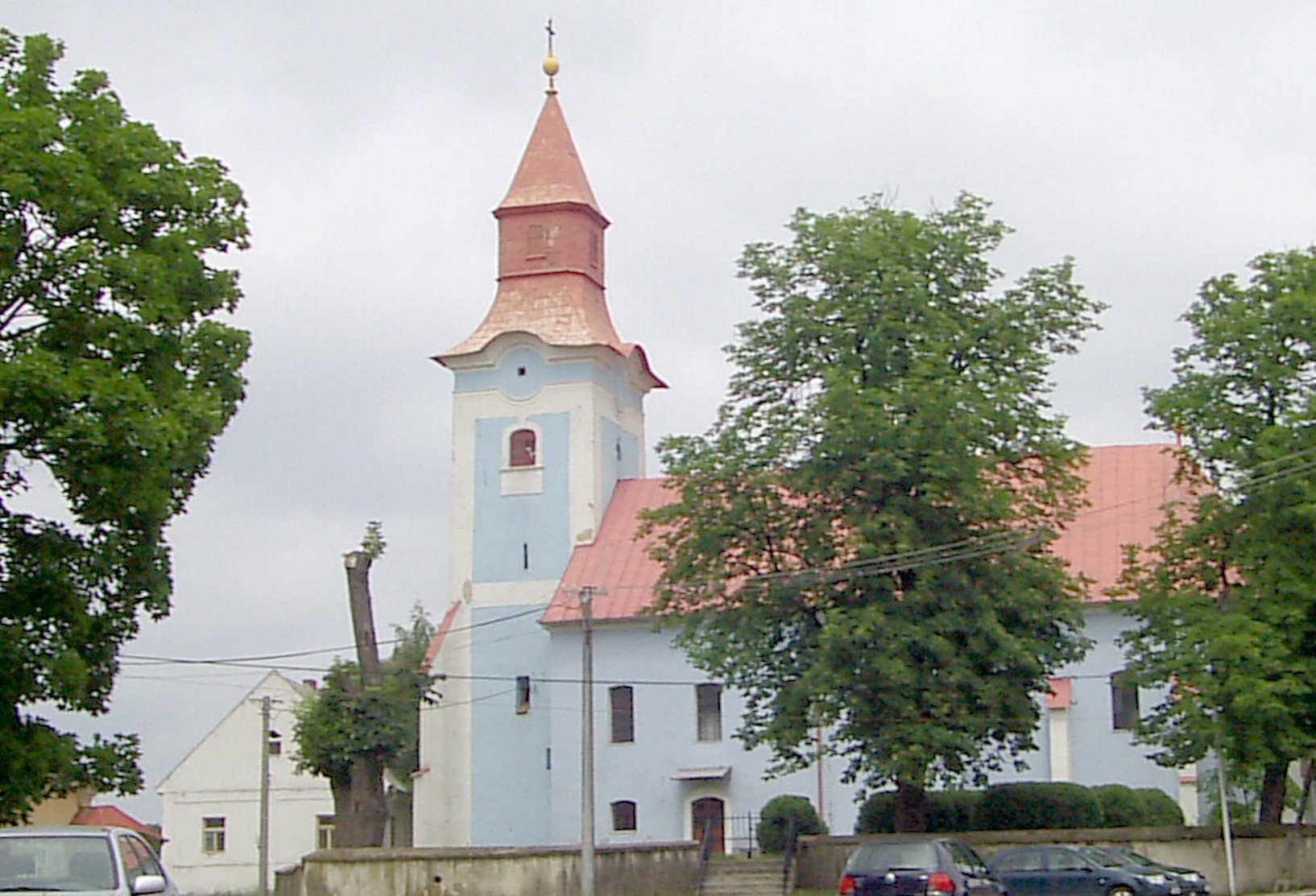

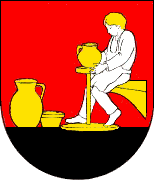
- Flag Coat of arms

- Location of Pozdišovce in the Košice Region Location of Pozdišovce in Slovakia
- Coordinates: 48.73°N 21.85°E
- Country: Slovakia
- Region: Košice Region
- District: Michalovce District
- First mentioned: 1315

Area
  - Total: 18.04 km^{2} (6.97 sq mi)
- Elevation: 120 m (390 ft)

Population (2025)
  - Total: 1,296
- Time zone: UTC+1 (CET)
  - Summer (DST): UTC+2 (CEST)
- Postal code: 720 1
- Area code: +421 56
- Vehicle registration plate (until 2022): MI
- Website: www.pozdisovce.sk

Pozdišovce (Hungarian: Pazdics) is a village and municipality in Michalovce District in the Košice Region of eastern Slovakia.

== History ==
In historical records, the village was first mentioned in 1315. It lies in the Zemplín lowland. The town of Pozdišovce is commonly found on historical documents under the name of Pazdics. (Pazdics, being the Hungarian form of Pozdišovce.)

== Geography ==
The municipality lies at an altitude of 120 metres (390 ft) and covers an area of 18.04 km^{2} (6.97 sq mi) (2025).

== Population ==
Population statistic (10 years)
Year	1995	2005	2015	2025
Count	1197	1234	1289	1296
Difference		+3.09%	+4.45%	+0.54%

Population statistic
Year	2024	2025
Count	1307	1296
Difference		−0.84%

It has a population of 1296 people (31 December 2025).

=== Ethnicity ===
Census 2021 (1+ %)
Ethnicity	Number	Fraction
Slovak	1281	96.02%
Not found out	32	2.39%
Total	1334	

In year 2021 was 1334 people by ethnicity 1281 as Slovak, 32 as Not found out, 13 as Romani, 13 as Rusyn, 10 as Hungarian, 7 as Czech, 4 as Other, 2 as German, 1 as Ukrainian, 1 as Italian and 1 as Polish.

Note on population: The difference values of population numbers in the table "Population statistic" and in the sections "Ethnicity" & "Religion" is caused by the use of various statistical methods.

=== Religion ===
Census 2021 (1+ %)
Religion	Number	Fraction
Roman Catholic Church	404	30.28%
Evangelical Church	398	29.84%
Eastern Orthodox Church	186	13.94%
Greek Catholic Church	158	11.84%
None	102	7.65%
Not found out	44	3.3%
Jehovah's Witnesses	20	1.5%
Total	1334	

In year 2021 was 1334 people by religion 404 from Roman Catholic Church, 398 from Evangelical Church, 186 from Eastern Orthodox Church, 158 from Greek Catholic Church, 102 from None, 44 from Not found out, 20 from Jehovah's Witnesses, 13 from Calvinist Church, 3 from Church of the Brethren, 3 from Ad hoc movements, 1 from Other and not ascertained christian church, 1 from Czechoslovak Hussite Church and 1 from Buddhism.

== Culture ==
The village has a public library and a football field.

Pozdišovce is famous throughout the country for its unique ceramics manufacturing tradition, with dark glazing and unusual ornaments.

== Cultural heritage monuments ==
- Lutheran church
- Greek Catholic church 3D model
- Pozdišovce manor house

== Transport ==
Pozdišovce lies on the main eastward route from Košice to Michalovce and to the Slovak-Ukrainian border crossing at Vyšné Nemecké.

The village of Pozdišovce has three bus stops and regular bus services to Michalovce, Sečovce, Košice and various neighbouring rural municipalities.

== Gallery ==
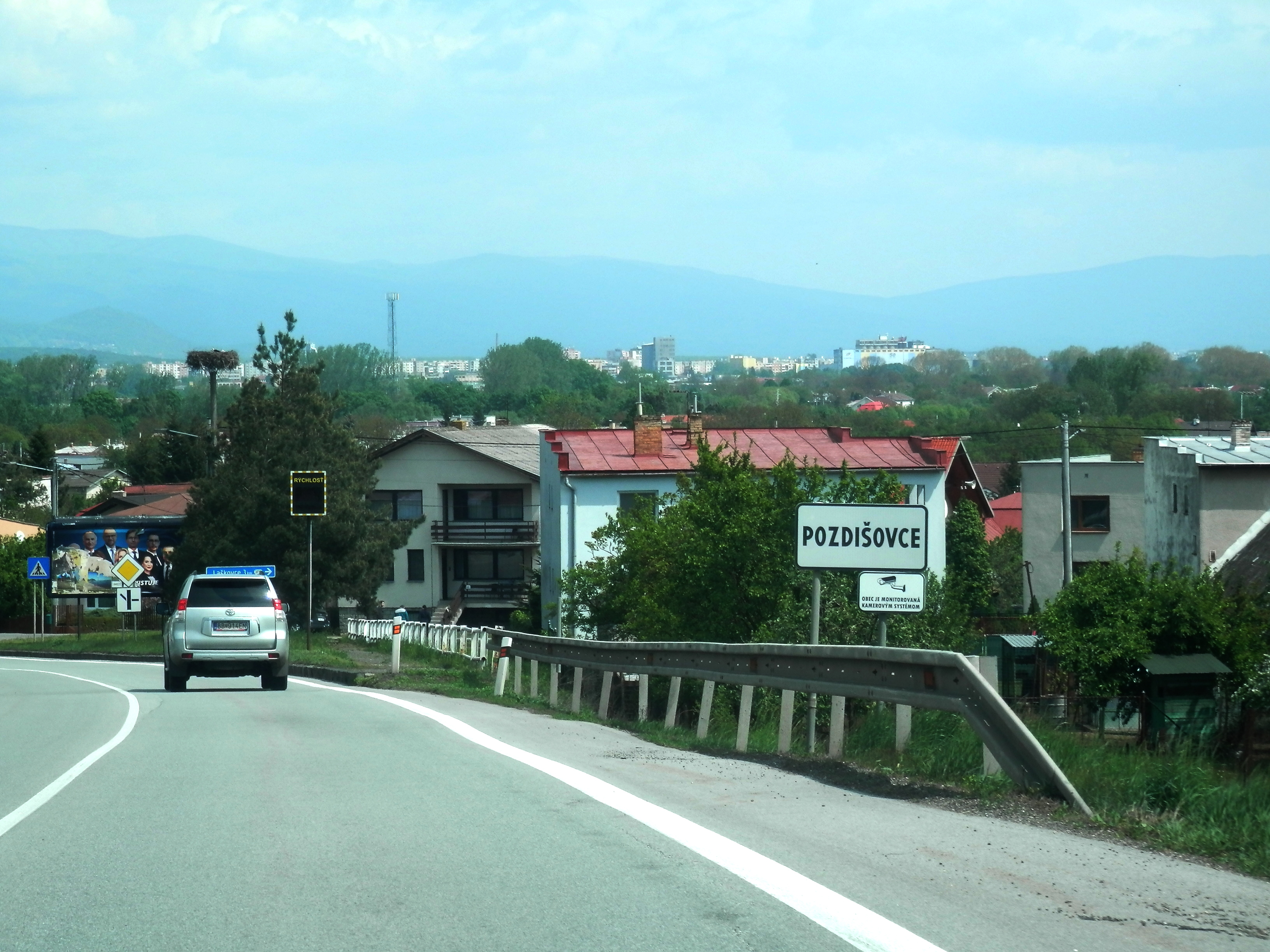
Entering Pozdišovce from the west, on the main road between Košice and Michalovce

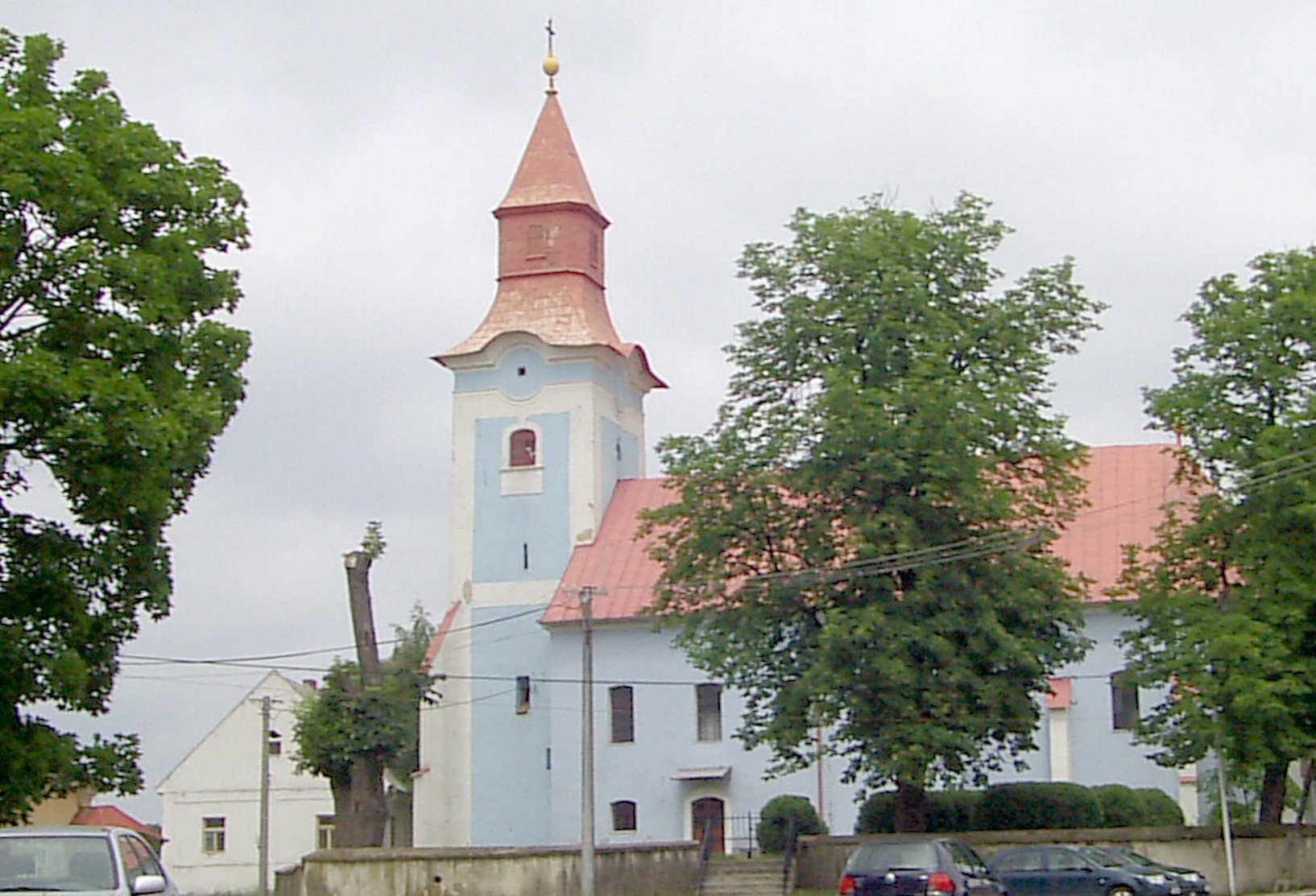
Lutheran church in Pozdišovce

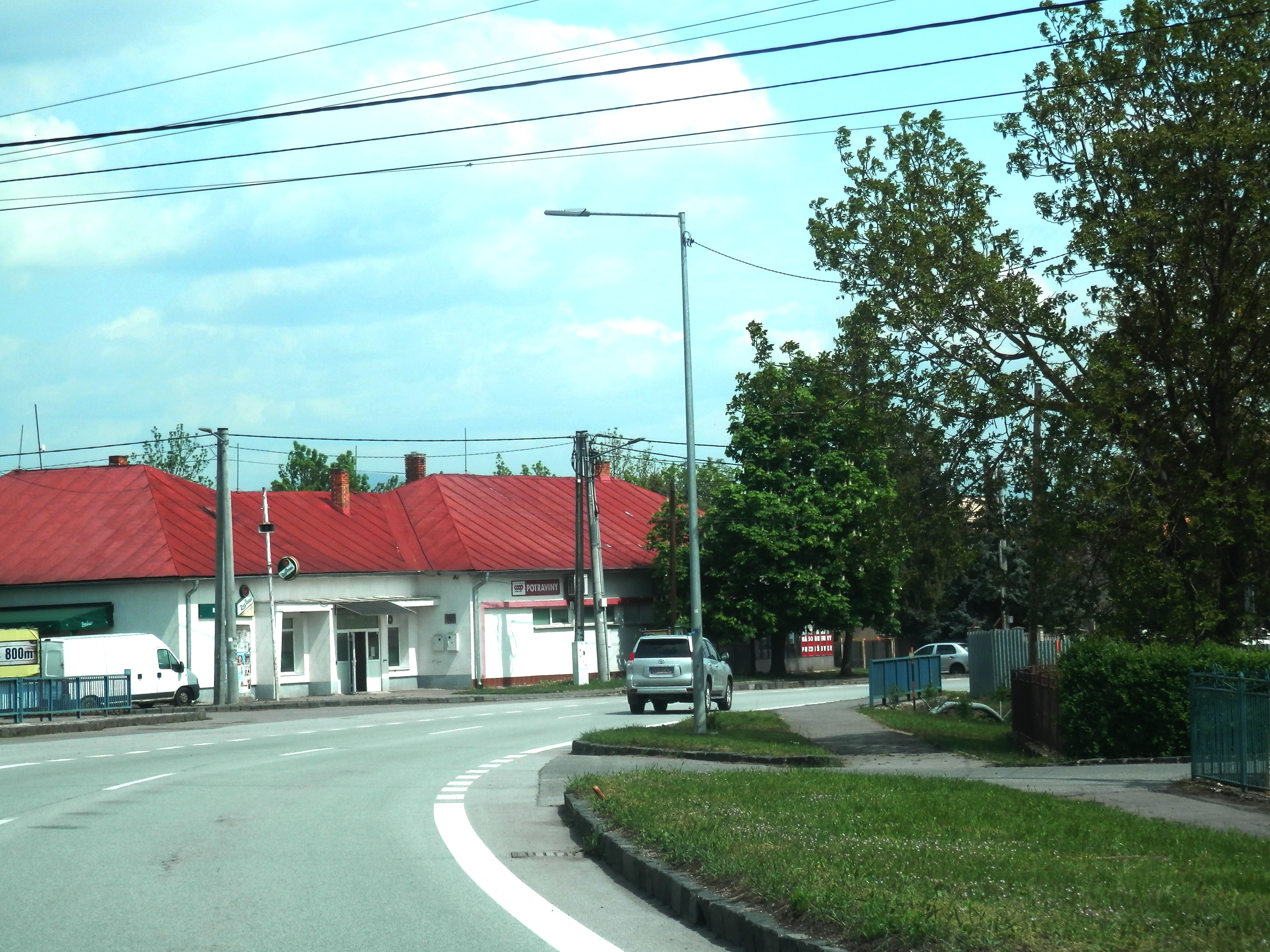
A street in Pozdišovce

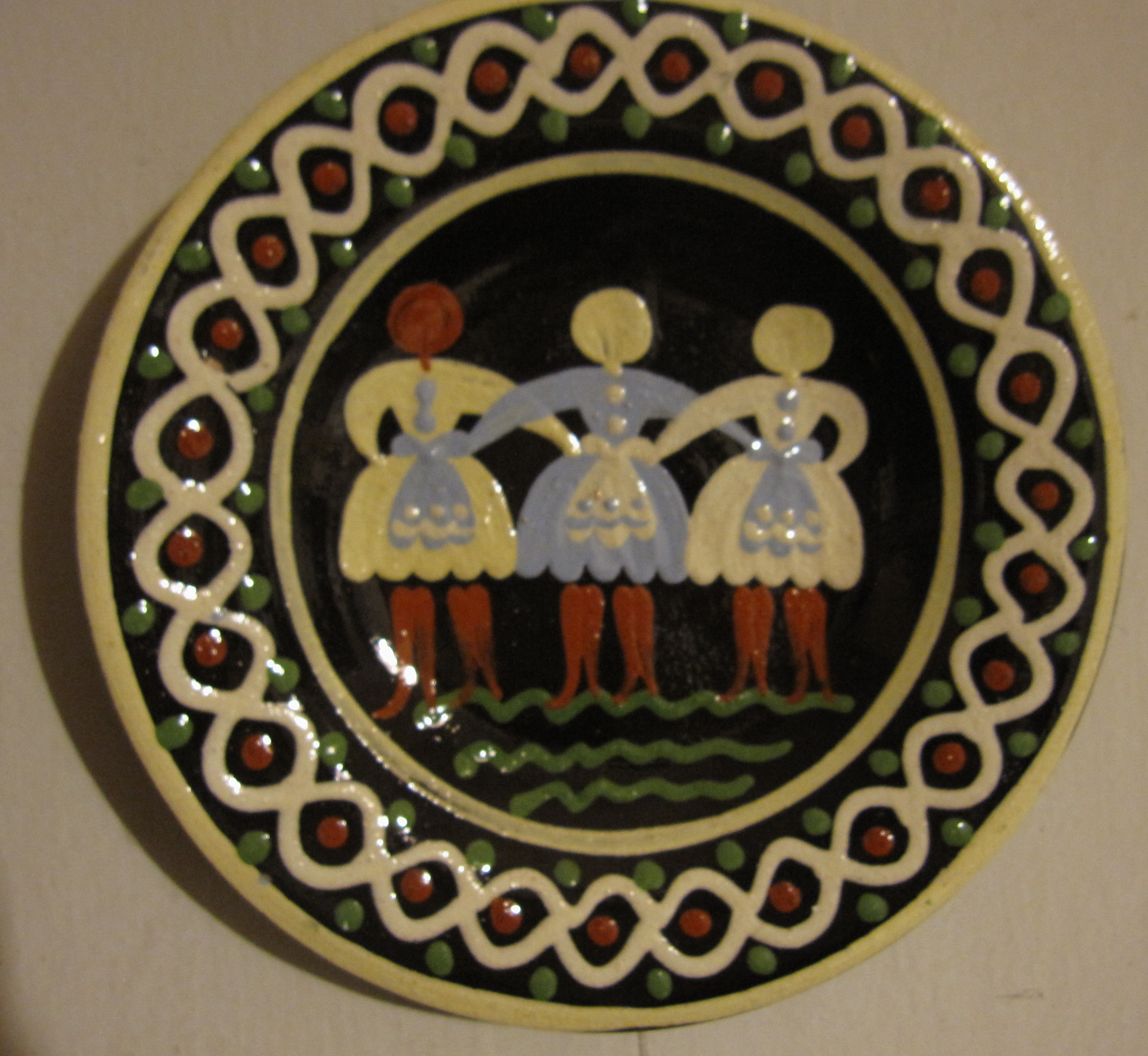
Traditional Pozdišovce glazed and decorated ceramics

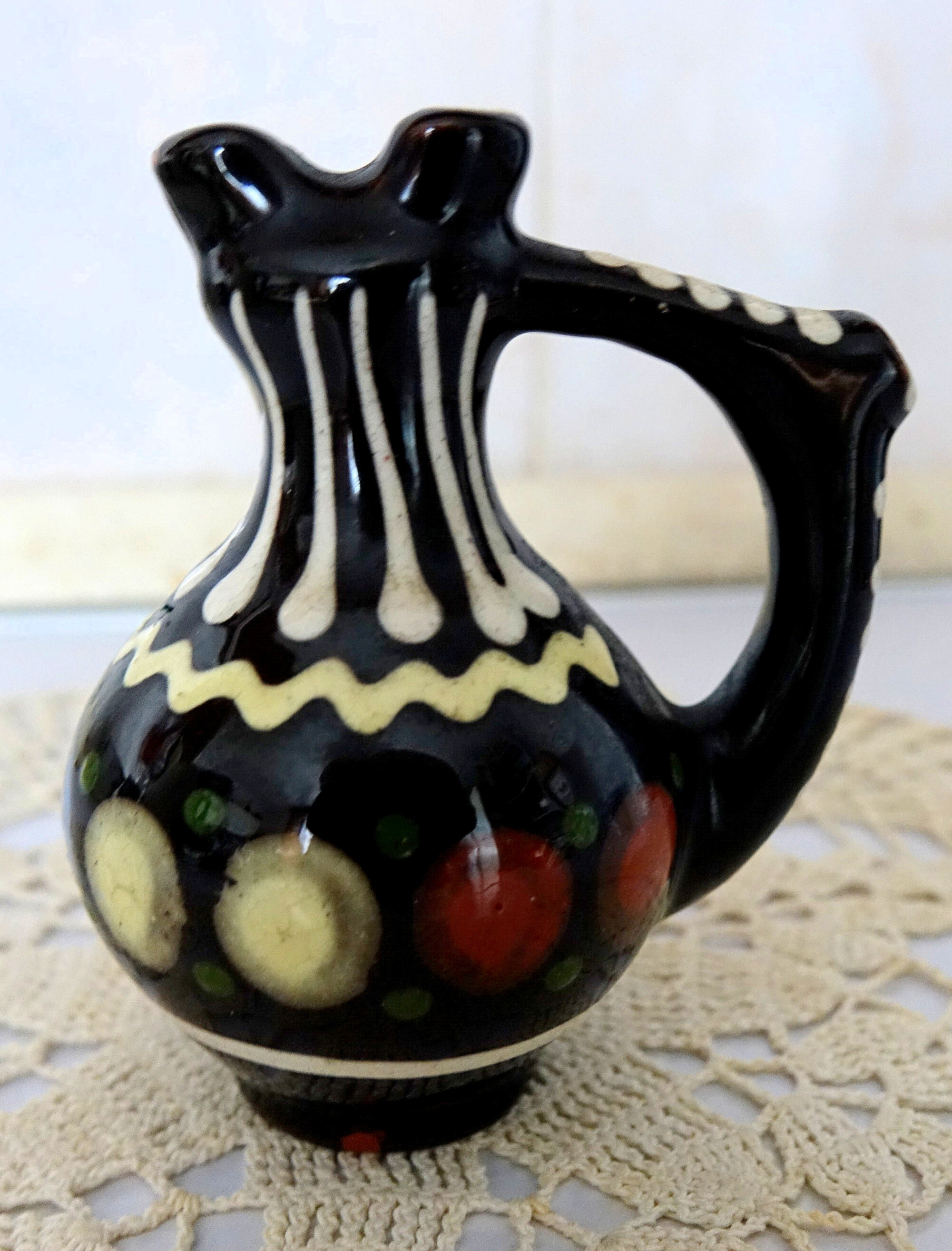
Traditional Pozdišovce glazed and decorated ceramics

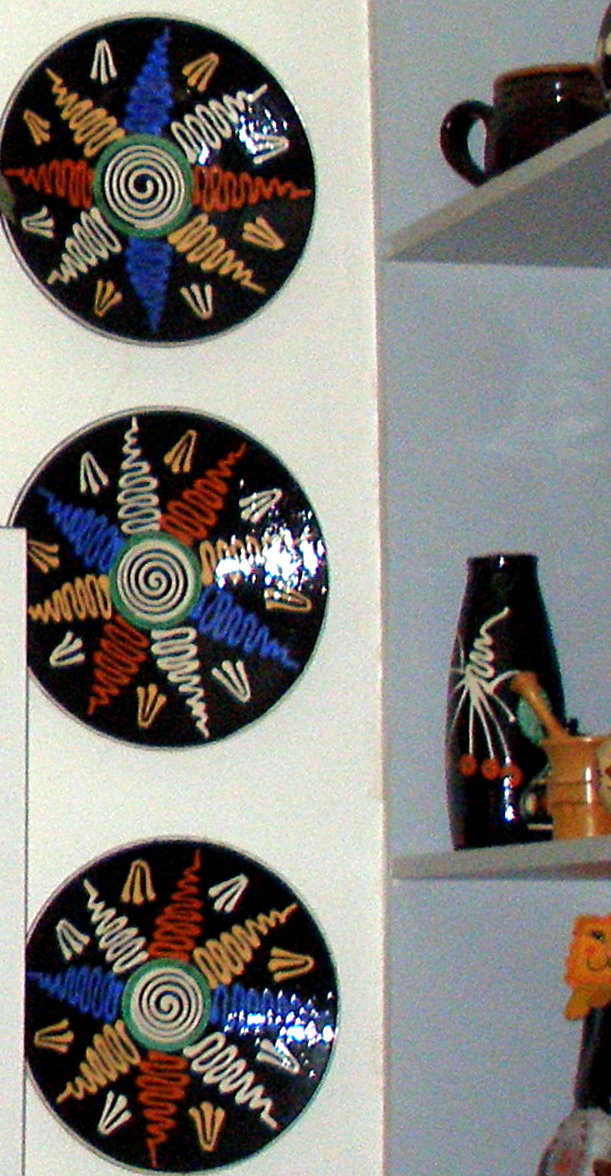
Traditional Pozdišovce glazed and decorated ceramics

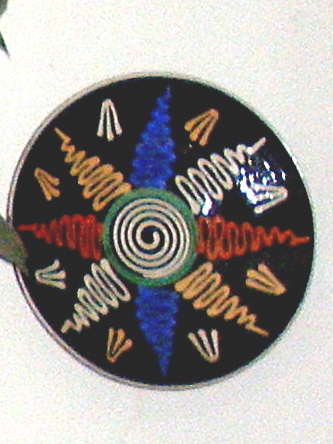
Traditional Pozdišovce glazed and decorated ceramics

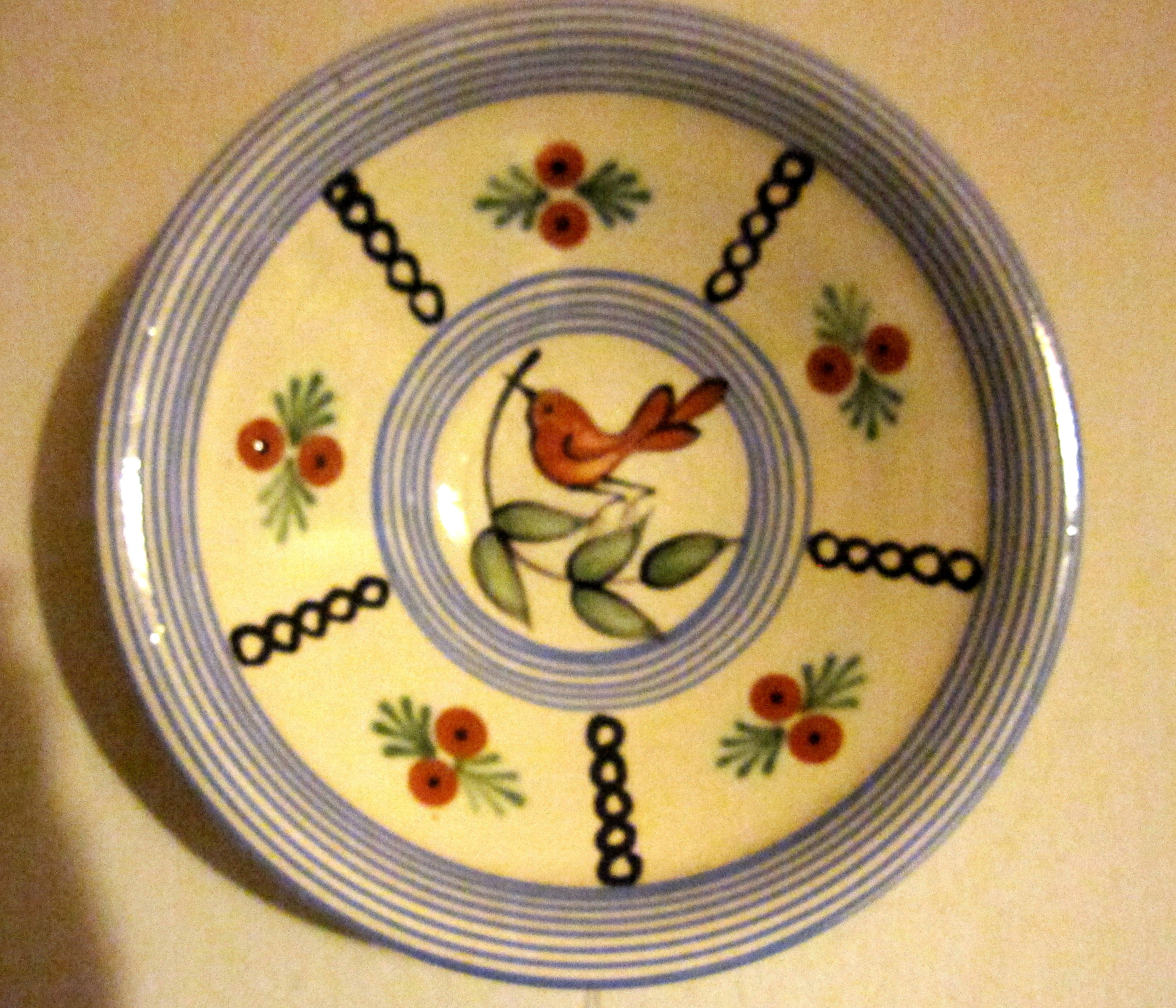
Traditional Pozdišovce glazed and decorated ceramics

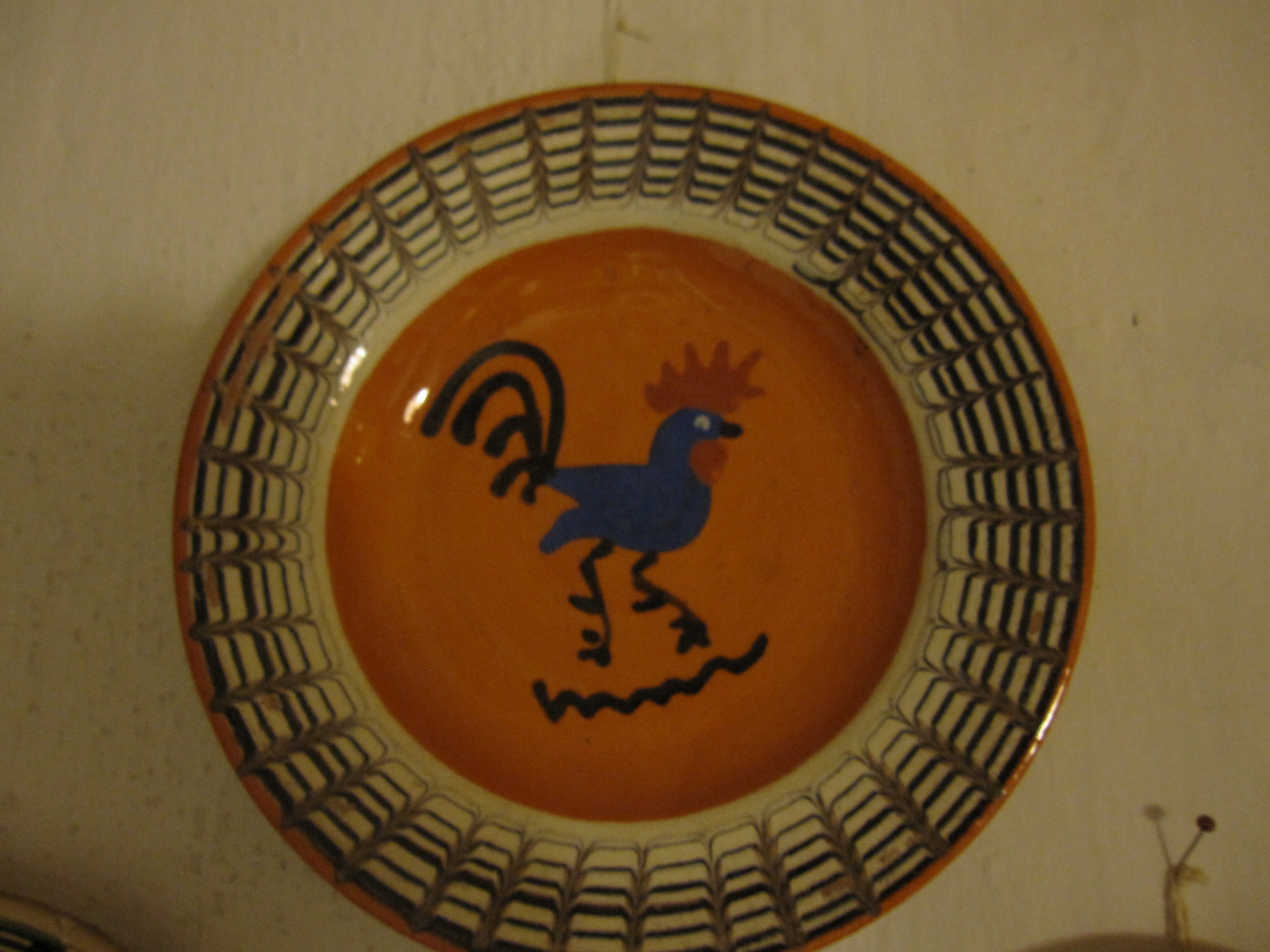
Traditional Pozdišovce glazed and decorated ceramics
