= Krásný Dvůr Castle =

Castle in Ústí nad Labem Region, Czech Republic

Coordinates: 50°15′8″N 13°22′11″E

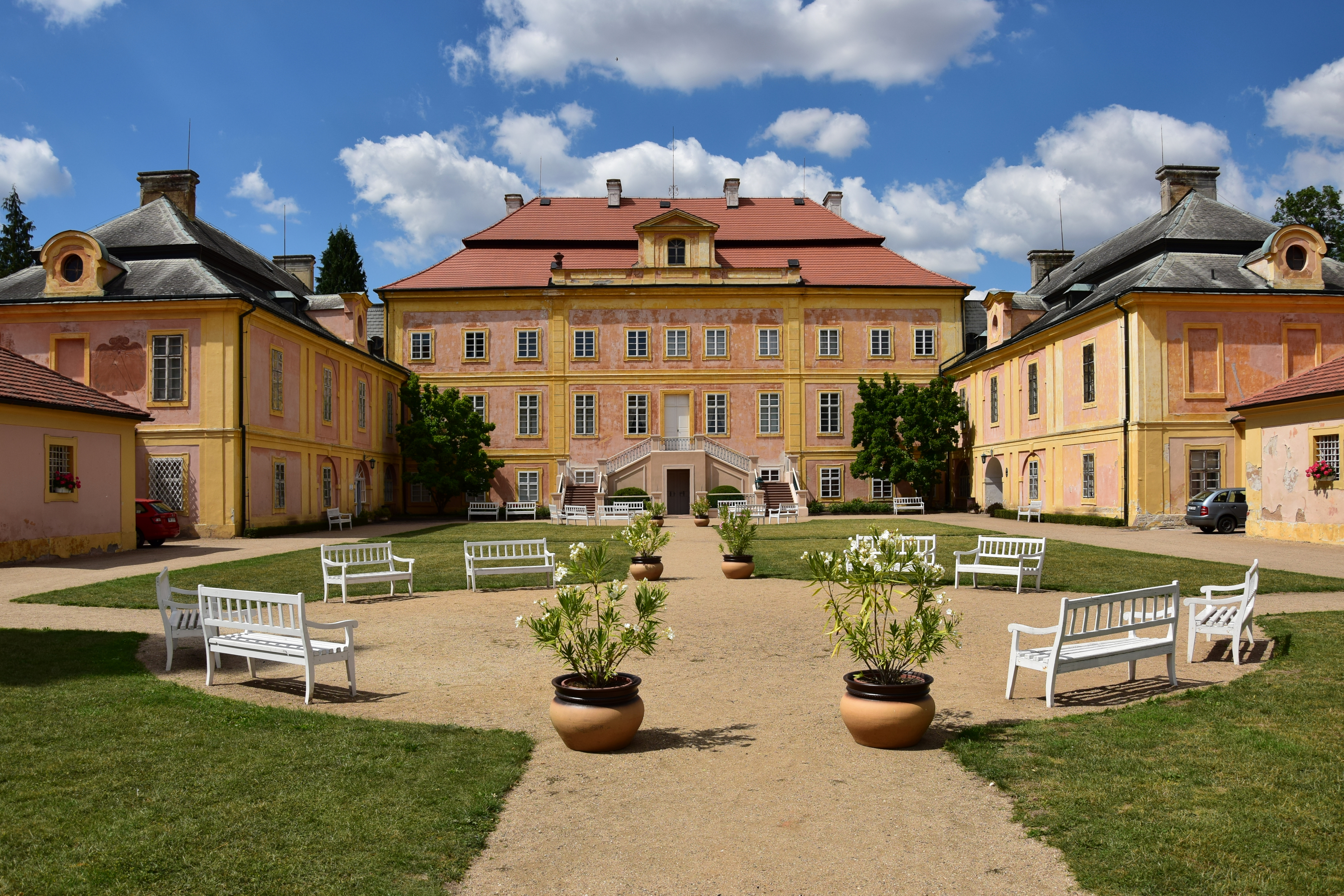
Courtyard and main building of the castle

Krásný Dvůr Castle (Czech: zámek Krásný Dvůr; German: Schönhof) is a Baroque castle in Krásný Dvůr, Ústí nad Labem Region, Czech Republic. It has a 250-acre (1.0 km^{2}) English-style landscape park and a garden inspired by that of Versailles. It is protected as a national cultural monument.

== History ==
The first records of Krásný Dvůr date back to the 14th century, since then numerous aristocratic families (e.g. Kolowrats) held possession of it until Count Hermann Czernin bought it in the middle of the 17th century. Count Franz Josef Czernin decided to start an extensive reconstruction on a Renaissance villa built on the site of a Gothic stronghold originally constructed by Jan Maštovský of Kolovraty at the end of the 16th century.

The reconstruction project was undertaken by Czech architect František Maxmilián Kaňka and was distinctly influenced by the French architecture; construction went on between 1720 and 1724. Some alterations of the castle buildings were made at the end of the 18th century. In 1783 the chapel was erected, in 1791–1792 two-pair staircases were built in the court and in the northern garden and ground arcades were walled at the same time.

== Exhibition ==
Eighteen rooms and lobby galleries are open to the public. Valuable paintings by Czech and European artists are installed here (some of the most well-known being Petr Brandl, Karel Škréta, Ludvík Kohl, Joseph Bergler, Filip Kristian Benthum, Kristian Brand and Élisabeth Vigée-Lebrun), and a number of graphic arts, porcelain, china, glass, earthenware, clocks, original Adam fireplaces, furniture and other samples of historical craftsmen's skills are to be seen. Some thematic collections are also remarkable (e.g. an extensive Baroque pictorial anthology of dog-portrayals by artist Petr Václav.

== Park ==
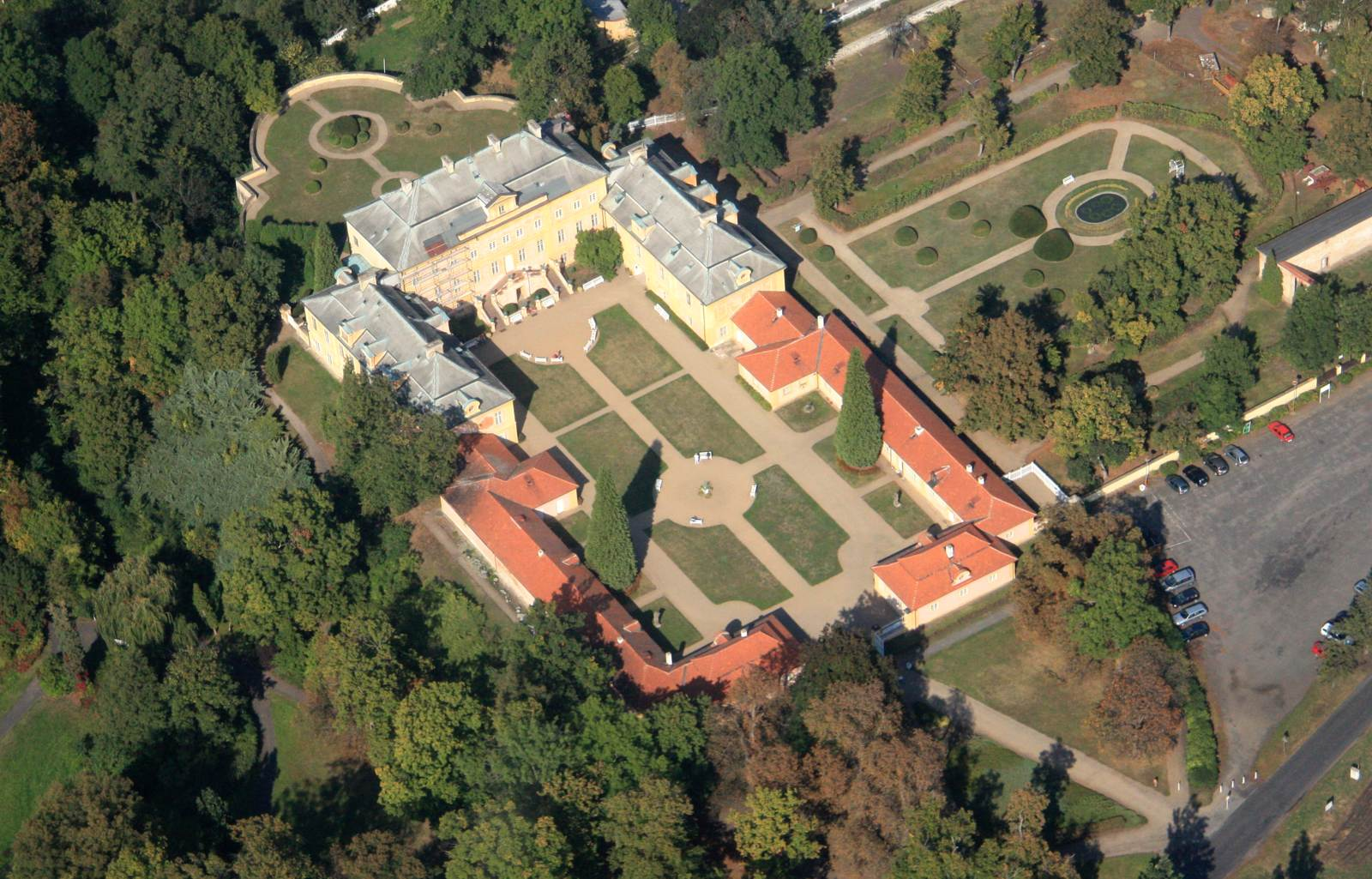
Aerial view of the castle, including part of its park

The castle park in Krásný Dvůr park with an area of 250 acres (1.0 km^{2}) was founded in 1783–1793 by Johann Rudolf Czernin. He was influenced partly by his botanic inclinations and then also by his journey around Western Europe, which he undertook in 1779. In those days a new park trend had begun expanding into Europe from England. Natural scenery was to be brought into the very neighbourhood of buildings according to this trend. The principle of the landscape park is based directly on the condition of a natural landscape, not an artificially man-made one. The castle park of Krásný Dvůr is true evidence of this school of thought. In accordance with taste of those days it was brightened with a number of Romantic buildings enriching vacant fields or closing various vistas of park scenes.

From the dendrological point of view you can find more than one hundred species of trees in the park, and entirely domestic or domesticated species only. A number of ancient oaks, beeches, limes, horse chestnuts, plane trees, maples and alders grow there. The most important of them is the so-called Goethe's Oak (today already only a torso), the age of which is estimated at 1,000 years, which ranks it among the oldest trees in the Czech Republic. Deeper in the park we find Pan's-Temple, the Obelisk, the Vantage Pavilion, Goethe's Pavilion, a memorial plaque with the engraved names of important people who have visited the park, a hermitage, a grotto with a sarcophagus and other interesting objects. The so-called French garden, situated behind the eastern part of the castle, is also of note. Its parterre is solved with a pond and grassy areas, which are embellished with large yew-trees and smaller box-trees.

== In film ==
The castle was used by Jiří Menzel as a location for his film "End of Old Times" ("Konec starých časů", 1989), based on a 1934 eponymous novel by Vladislav Vančura.
