= Ďurďoš =

- Municipality
- Flag

- Location of Ďurďoš in the Prešov Region Location of Ďurďoš in Slovakia
- Coordinates: 49.05°N 21.52°E
- Country: Slovakia
- Region: Prešov Region
- District: Vranov nad Topľou District
- First mentioned: 1363

Area
  - Total: 6.13 km^{2} (2.37 sq mi)
- Elevation: 170 m (560 ft)

Population (2025)
  - Total: 288
- Time zone: UTC+1 (CET)
  - Summer (DST): UTC+2 (CEST)
- Postal code: 943 1
- Area code: +421 57
- Vehicle registration plate (until 2022): VT
- Website: www.durdos.sk

Ďurďoš (Hungarian: Györgyös) is a village and municipality in Vranov nad Topľou District in the Prešov Region of eastern Slovakia.

== History ==
In historical records the village was first mentioned in 1363.

== Geography ==
The municipality lies at an altitude of 170 metres (560 ft) and covers an area of 6.13 km^{2} (2.37 sq mi) (2025).

== Population ==
Population statistic (10 years)
Year	1995	2005	2015	2025
Count	181	236	270	288
Difference		+30.38%	+14.40%	+6.66%

Population statistic
Year	2024	2025
Count	285	288
Difference		+1.05%

It has a population of 288 people (31 December 2025).

=== Ethnicity ===
Census 2021 (1+ %)
Ethnicity	Number	Fraction
Slovak	231	90.23%
Romani	102	39.84%
Not found out	12	4.68%
Czech	3	1.17%
Total	256	

In year 2021 was 256 people by ethnicity 231 as Slovak, 102 as Romani, 12 as Not found out and 3 as Czech.

Note on population: The difference values of population numbers in the table "Population statistic" and in the sections "Ethnicity" & "Religion" is caused by the use of various statistical methods.

=== Religion ===
Census 2021 (1+ %)
Religion	Number	Fraction
Greek Catholic Church	166	64.84%
Roman Catholic Church	28	10.94%
Evangelical Church	27	10.55%
None	16	6.25%
Not found out	11	4.3%
Jehovah's Witnesses	3	1.17%
Total	256	

In year 2021 was 256 people by religion 166 from Greek Catholic Church, 28 from Roman Catholic Church, 27 from Evangelical Church, 16 from None, 11 from Not found out, 3 from Jehovah's Witnesses, 2 from Christian Congregations in Slovakia, 1 from Calvinist Church, 1 from Apostolic Church and 1 from Ad hoc movements.

According to the 2011 census, the municipality had 245 inhabitants. 204 of inhabitants were Slovaks, 20 Roma and 21 others and unspecified.

In 2019, the local Roma community constituted an estimated 72% of the population.

== Genealogical resources ==
The records for genealogical research are available at the state archive "Statny Archiv in Presov, Slovakia"

- Roman Catholic church records (births/marriages/deaths): 1853-1910 (parish B)
- Greek Catholic church records (births/marriages/deaths): 1847-1939 (parish A)
