= Smičiklas =

Smičiklas is a Croatian surname, found in Žumberak (the villages of Sošice and Reštovo Žumberačko). Its bearers are Greek-Catholics. The family descends from Uskoks. Today, in Croatia, most bearers (who number 70) identify as ethnic Croats, while a minority as Serbs. It may refer to:

- Tadija Smičiklas (1843–1914), Croatian historian and politician
- Đuro Smičiklas (1815–1881), Croatian Greek-Catholic bishop
- Gabrijel Smičiklas (1783–1856), Croatian Greek-Catholic bishop
