= Church of Intercession of the Theotokos, Kričke =

Church of Intercession of the Theotokos
- Crkva Pokrova Presvete Bogorodice
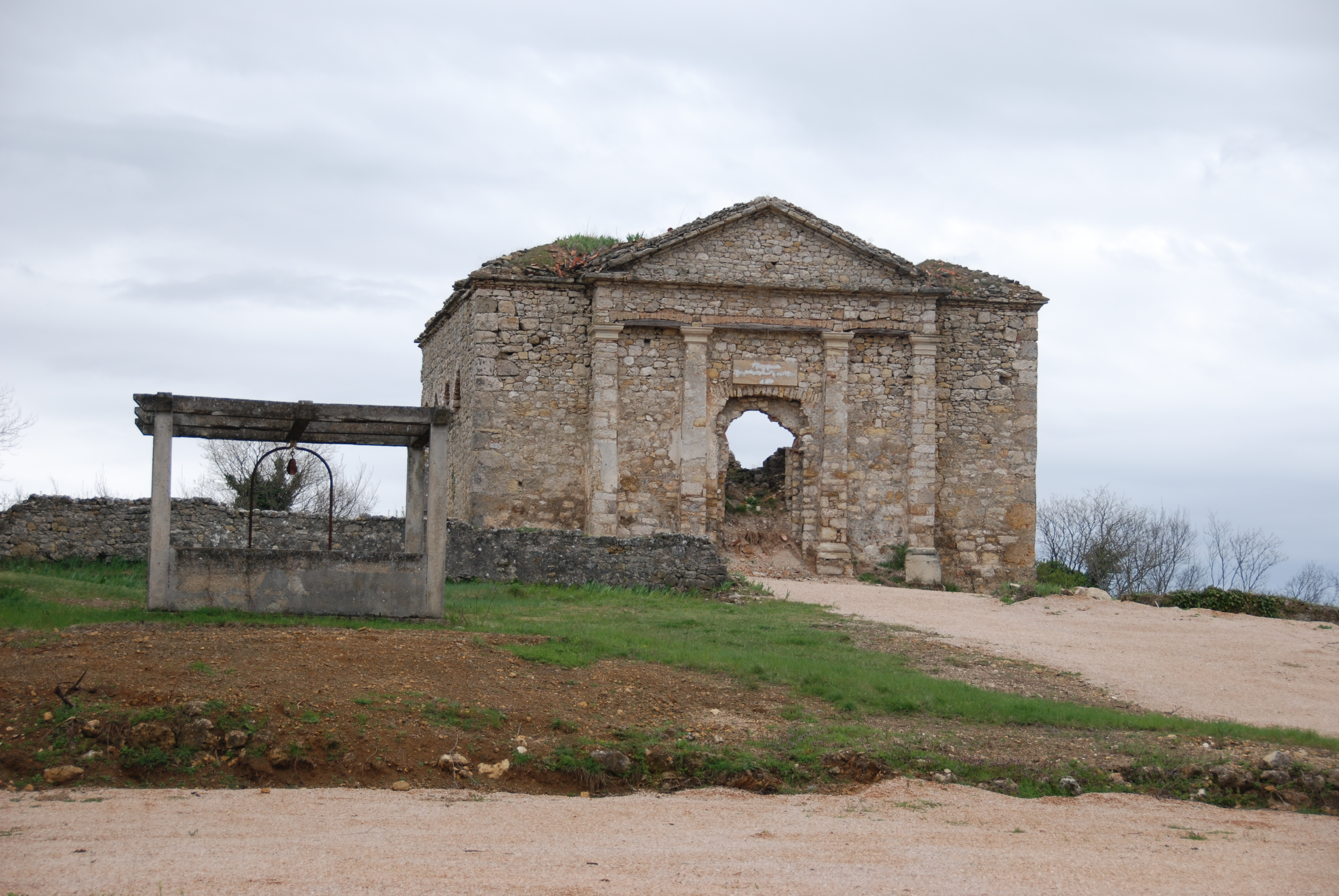

- Location within Croatia
- 43°49′01″N 16°13′01″E
- Location: Kričke, Šibenik-Knin County
- Country: Croatia
- Denomination: Greek Catholic

History
- Status: Church
- Dedication: Intercession of the Theotokos

Architecture
- Functional status: Inactive
- Architect: Valentin Presani
- Groundbreaking: 1832
- Completed: 1836

Administration
- Metropolis: Greek Catholic Church of Croatia and Serbia
- Diocese: Greek Catholic Eparchy of Križevci

The Church of Intercession of the Theotokos (Croatian: Crkva Pokrova Presvete Bogorodice) is a Greek Catholic church in Kričke, Croatia.

== History ==
=== Construction and dedication ===
Construction of the church begun in late 1832. In February 1833 construction was stopped, but it was resumed next month. It was projected by architect Valentin Presani in Classicist style. In 1836, the church was dedicated. Dormitory was constructed next to the church.

=== Destruction ===
The interior of the church was almost completely destroyed in World War II. In 1942, the Chetniks devastated and burned the church and expelled priest Janko Heraković, who came to Kričke in 1925 and was the last Greek Catholic priest in the village and in Dalmatia as a whole. After Heraković was arrested by the Partisans in 1945, Kričke did not have its own Greek Catholic priest until 2010.

In 1947, the church burnt down after a lightning struck it and ignited hay which was stored inside by the Partisans. At the same time, dormitory was turned into elementary school.

In 1992, during the Croatian War of Independence, church towers were mined by rebel Serbs.

=== Restoration ===
In 2009, the surrounding terrain around the church was cleared, thus fulfilling the prerequisites for the church's restoration. In March 2011, restoration began under the supervision and guidance of the Drniš Town Museum.

In 2010, for the first time since World War II, Greek Catholic liturgy was held in Kričke on the occasion of the celebration of Intercession of the Theotokos. The liturgy, which was held in front of the ruined church, was led by Greek Catholic Vicar for Dalmatia, Milan Stipić.

On 1 October 2011, with restoration in progress, a solemn liturgy was held in front of the church, led by the Bishop of the Greek Catholic Eparchy of Križevci Nikola Kekić in concelebration with Greek Catholic and Roman Catholic priests.
