= Tadija Smičiklas =

Croatian historian and politician

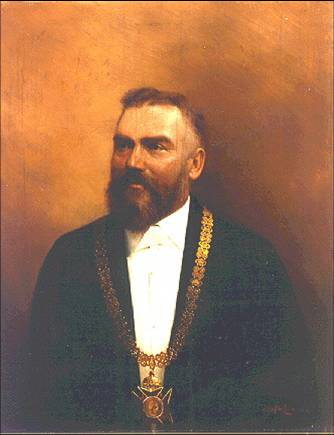
- Tade Smičiklas, a painting by Joso Bužan, 1902
- Born: 1 October 1843; Reštovo near Žumberak, Kingdom of Croatia, Austrian Empire
- Died: 8 June 1914 (aged 70); Zagreb, Kingdom of Croatia-Slavonia, Austria-Hungary
- Scientific career
- Fields: History
- Institutions: University of Zagreb, Yugoslav Academy of Sciences and Arts

Tadija "Tade" Smičiklas (1 October 1843 – 8 June 1914) was a Croatian historian and politician. He was a professor at the Zagreb university and a member of the Croatian Academy. A member of the Illyrianist People's Party, he supported the independence of Croatia from the Austrian Empire. He authored the first history book on Croatia and laid the foundation of Croatian historiography.

== Early life ==
Smičiklas was born in Reštovo in Žumberak (German: Sichelburg), into a Greek-Catholic family. Greek-Catholics in Žumberak, including Smičiklas, are descendants of Uskoks. His father Ilija sent a request on 13 August 1853 to the Greek-Catholic bishop of Križevci, Gabrijel Smičiklas (his relative), to accept Tadija free of charge into the Greek Catholic Seminary in Zagreb and stressed Tadija's talent and wish to learn more. His uncle Đuro Smičiklas had him accepted.

== Education ==
In September 1843 Tadija enrolled at the Greek Catholic Seminary in Zagreb, where he would stay for nine years. After finishing his studies there, he went on to study history and geography in the Imperial capital Vienna in 1864–69.

== Career ==
He began his professorial career at the gymnasium in Rijeka in 1870 and several years later was appointed at the Zagreb gymnasium. He became rector of the Greek Catholic Seminary in Zagreb (1877–1882), a position which is normally held by priests. In 1882 he became a full-time professor at the Faculty of Philosophy at the University of Zagreb. In 1883 he became a member of the Yugoslav Academy of Sciences and Arts.

He was a member of the Independent People's Party, and was a follower of Franjo Rački and bishop Josip Juraj Strossmayer. As a member of the Croatian Parliament Smičiklas had several memorable speeches. In 1891 he stated, "We seek that independent Croatia has the status in the monarchy which Hungary already has". He publicly defied ban Dragutin Karoly Khuen-Héderváry.

In the 1886/87 academic year he became the dean of the Faculty of Philosophy and soon after was selected as the rector of the entire university. From 1875 he was an alderman in Matica hrvatska, and from 1889 to 1891 he was its president. In 1900 he was selected as president of the Yugoslav Academy of Sciences and Arts and he remained in this post until his death.

In 1905 he retired from public life. He was an honoured citizen of Zagreb, Varaždin and Karlovac.

Smičiklas published the first history of Croatia (2 volumes, 1879–1882) which was scholarly, critical, comprehensive and founded on reliable authenticated evidence that, together with his other work, laid the foundation for Croatian scholarly historiography and contributed to the strengthening of the idea of continuity of Croatian statehood and independence.

== Works ==
- Život i djela Vjekoslava Babukića (1876)
- Spomen knjiga Matice Hrvatske
- Obrana i razvitak hrvatske narodne ideje od 1790. do 1835.
- Život i djela Ivana Kukuljevića Sakcinskog
- Život i djela dra. Franje Račkoga (1855)

== Notes ==
Cultural offices
| Preceded by Ivan Kukuljević Sakcinski | President of Matica hrvatska 1889–1901 | Succeeded by Ivan Trnski |
Academic offices
| Preceded by Franjo Vrbanić | Rector of the University of Zagreb; 1887–1888 | Succeeded by Antun Franki |
| Preceded by Josip Torbar | Chairman of the Yugoslav Academy of Sciences and Arts; 1900–1914 | Succeeded by Tomislav Maretić |
