= Joakim Segedi =

Croatian Catholic bishop

- Titular Archeparch of Gypsaria
- Church: Greek Catholic Church of Croatia and Serbia
- In office: 24 February 1963 – 20 March 2004
- Predecessor: Joaquín Albareda y Ramoneda
- Successor: José Roberto Ospina Leongómez
- Other post: Auxiliary Eparch of Križevci (1963-1984)

Orders
- Ordination: 4 September 1927 by Dionisije Njaradi
- Consecration: 28 July 1963 by Josyf Slipyj

Personal details
- Born: 27 October 1904 Ruski Krstur, Bács-Bodrog County, Kingdom of Hungary, Transleithania, Austria-Hungary
- Died: 20 March 2004 (aged 99)

Joakim Segedi (27 October 1904 – 20 March 2004) was a Ruthenian and Croatian Greek Catholic hierarch. He was auxiliary bishop as Titular Bishop of Gypsaria from 1963 to 1984 of the Eastern Catholic Eparchy of Križevci. In 17 March 2004, three days before his death, was elevated in rank of the titular archbishop with the same titular see of Gypsaria.

== Biography ==
Born in Ruski Krstur, Austria-Hungary (present day – Serbia) in 1904, he was ordained a priest on 4 September 1927 by Bishop Dionisije Njaradi for the Eparchy of Križevci. Fr. Segedi was the spiritual director of the Greek Catholic Seminary in Zagreb from 1930 to 1936 and the Bishop's personal assistant from 1936 to 1940.

He was appointed by the Holy See an Auxiliary Bishop on 24 February 1963. He was consecrated to the Episcopate on 28 July 1963. The principal consecrator was Metropolitan Yosyf Slipyi, and the principal co-consecrator were Archbishop Gabrijel Bukatko and Bishop Augustine Hornyak in Rome. Bishop Segedi retired as auxiliary bishop on 27 October 1984 in age 80.

He participated in the Second Vatican Council as a Council Father in 1960th. He died in Križevci on 20 March 2004.

Catholic Church titles
Preceded by Joaquín Anselmo María Albareda y Ramoneda	Titular Bishop of Gypsaria; 1963–2004	Succeeded by José Roberto Ospina Leongómez
