= Gornji Oštrc =

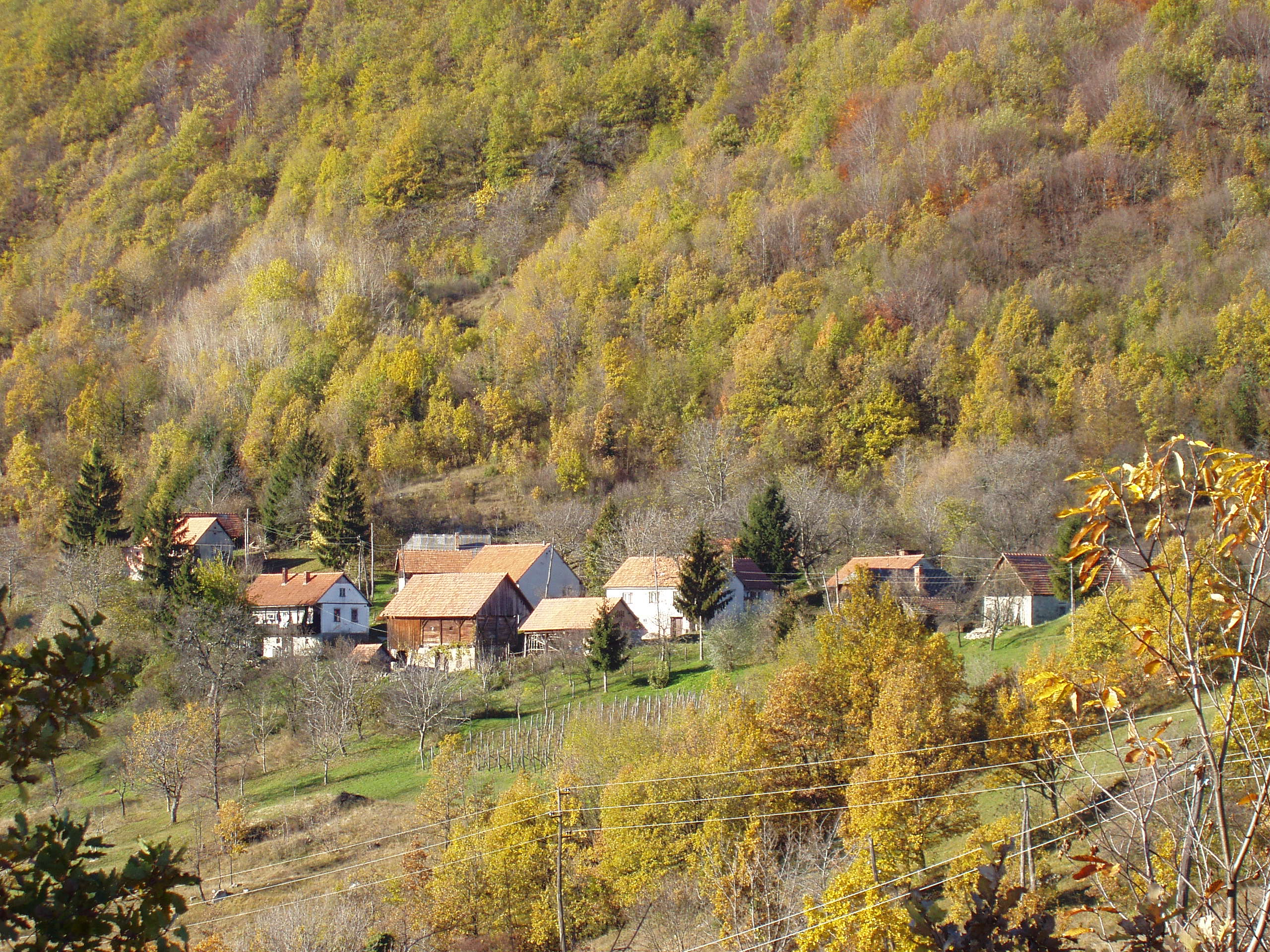

- Location within Croatia
- Coordinates: 45°42′59.11″N 15°24′58.62″E

Area
  - Total: 2.0 km^{2} (0.77 sq mi)

Population (2021)
  - Total: 36
  - Density: 18/km^{2} (47/sq mi)
- Time zone: Central European Time
- Postal code: 10455
- Area code: (+385) 10

Gornji Oštrc, together with Tupčina and Donji Oštrc form the settlement (naselje) of Oštrc, and belong to the municipality of Žumberak. In 1835, Gornji Oštrc had 12 houses and 167 inhabitants, however, it currently has 57 inhabitants according to the census in 2011.

Gornji Oštrc belongs to the parish of Oštrc, which was founded in 1827.
