= Oleksiy Bazyuk =

Greek Catholic hierarch (1873–1952)

- Apostolic Administrator of Apostolic Administration of Bosnia-Hercegovina
- Church: Greek Catholic Church of Croatia and Serbia, Ukrainian Greek Catholic Church
- Appointed: 9 October 1914
- Term ended: 1925
- Predecessor: New creation
- Successor: Suppressed
- Other post: Apostolic Vicar of Bosnia-Hercegovina (1925–1926)

Orders
- Ordination: 9 April 1898 (Priest) by Joseph Sembratovych

Personal details
- Born: 26 March 1873 Dobriany, Austro-Hungarian Empire (present day in Stryi Raion, Lviv Oblast, Ukraine)
- Died: 12 June 1952 (aged 79) Lavochne, Ukrainian SSR (present day in Stryi Raion, Lviv Oblast, Ukraine)
- Education: University of Lviv, Greek-Catholic Theological Seminary in Lviv

Oleksiy Bazyuk (Ukrainian: Олексій Базюк; 26 March 1873 – 12 June 1952) was a Greek Catholic hierarch. He served as the single Apostolic Administrator of the Ruthenian Catholic Apostolic Administration of Bosnia-Hercegovina from its establishing on 9 October 1914 until its dissolution in 1925.

== Early life and service ==
Oleksiy Bazyuk was born in the family of Greek-Catholics in 1873 in the Ukrainian Catholic Archeparchy of Lviv. After graduation of the popular school and gymnasium education in Stryi in 1894, he joined Faculty of Theology of the University of Lviv and the Greek-Catholic Theological Seminary in Lviv.

He was ordained as priest on 9 April 1898 by Metropolitan Joseph Sembratovych for the Archeparchy of Lviv, while completing his studies in Rome. After the one year parish work, Fr. Bazyuk continued to study in the University of Vienna and served simultaneously as an assistant priest in St. Barbara's church in Vienna (1898–1900). After returning he served as a parish priest in the different villages until 1908, when he went to serve among Ukrainians in Germany for six years and was elevated in rank of a Protonotary apostolic in 1913.

== Apostolic Administrator ==
On 9 October 1914, Fr. Bazyuk was appointed by Pope Benedict XV the first Apostolic Administrator of the new created Apostolic Administration of Bosnia-Hercegovina (that was established from the Greek Catholic Eparchy of Križevci) without dignity of bishop. He served in office until 1925 with the sees in Sarajevo (1914–1917) and after – in Banja Luka (1917–1925), when the Apostolic Administration was suppressed and merged again with the Eparchy of Križevci. But Fr. Bazyuk continued to serve in Bosnia until the end of 1926 as a parish priest in Banja Luka and the Apostolic Vicar of Bosnia-Hercegovina.

== Last years ==
In 1927 he returned to his native Archeparchy of Lviv and was a member of the Metropolitan Curia. After the Soviet annexation of Western Ukraine in 1939 he became a parish priest in village Chesnyky near Rohatyn. When the Communist regime abolished the Greek-Catholic Church in 1946, he clandestinely continued to serve as a priest in the Carpathian Mountains village Volosianka and after in Lavochne, where he died on 12 June 1952, at the age of 79.

Catholic Church titles
New title	Apostolic Administrator of Bosnia-Hercegovina; 1914–1925	Suppressed (merged to Eparchy of Križevci)
