= Anthony Petrushevych =

Ukrainian church historian and Greek Catholic priest

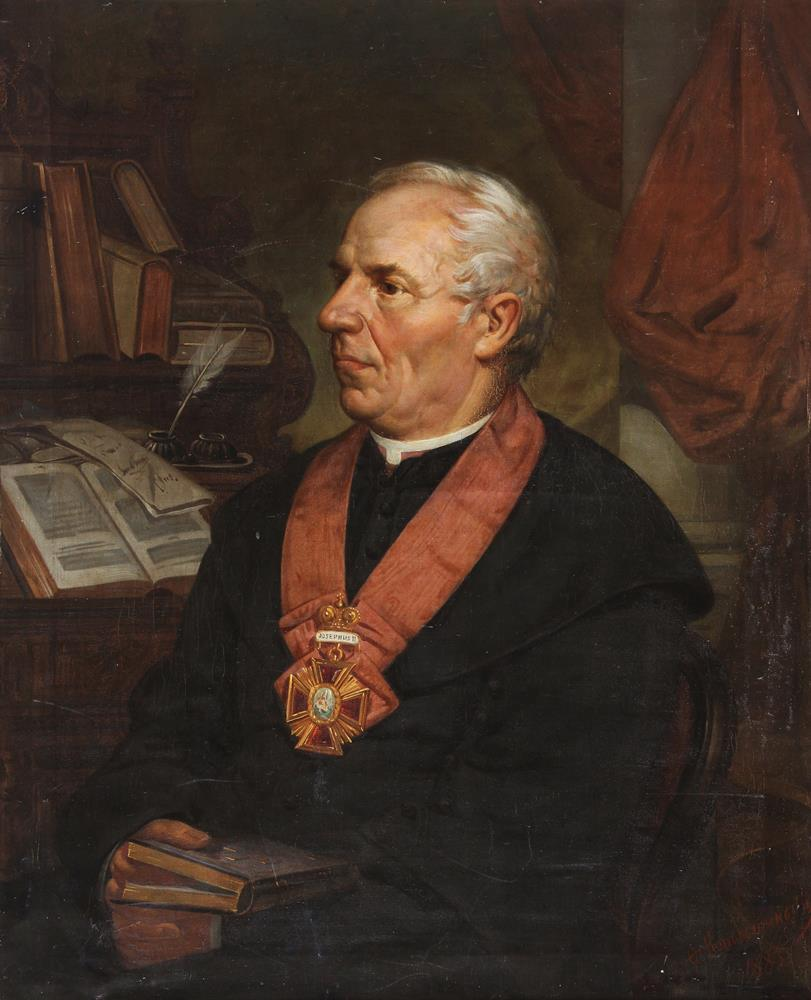
Anthony Petrushevych, Ukrainian historian, linguist, researcher of the history of Galicia, a priest of the UGCC

Anthony Petrushevych (Ukrainian: Петруше́вич Анто́ній Степа́нович; 18 January 1821 – 23 September 1913) was a Ukrainian historian, linguist, researcher of the history of Galicia, a priest of the UGCC.

== Biography ==
He was born in the village Dobriany, Kingdom of Galicia and Lodomeria, crown land of the Habsburg monarchy, the Austrian Empire in the family of local pastor UGCC of Stephan Petrushevych (1772-1850). (Now – Dobriany, Stryi Raion). He studied in Stryi, in the Lviv University (graduated 1845) and in the Greek-Catholic theological seminary. From 1851 to 1858 he was an adviser to the consistory, was the personal secretary of Metropolitan Michael Levitsky. He was a member of the Galician Sejm (1861-1877) and of the Austrian Parliament (1873-1878). He died in Lviv at the age of 92 years and he was buried at the Lychakiv Cemetery.

== Scientific research ==
The subject of the first research of Petrushevych had a history of the church in Galicia. Later – Slavic philology, ethnography, the study of archaeological remains and archival rarities. His, total 120, scientific papers related to the history of Galicia in the different eras. In the discussion about the original conception of August Belovsky about the existence of two Galichs - one of which was to be the center of Galician kingdom, which was located on the territory of present-day Slovakia (11th-12th centuries), and the other - the center of Galician principality on the Carpathian region (the middle of the 12th to 13th centuries). Petrushevych in his work “Whether two Galic? – 1865” convincingly showed that there was only one Halych, located on the Dniester, which was the capital of the principality of Halych in the 12th and 13th centuries.

Ivan Franko expressed surprise at the works of Petrushevych – from national-patriotic, pro-Ukrainian in early works, up to a typical Russian.

Some of his important works were:

- Russia and Poland - 1849
- Graven image, which opened in Zbruch - 1851
- About forged Bohemian monuments - 1879
- Volyn-Galician Chronicle, compiled by the end of the 13th century. 1205-1295. - 1871
- Summary Galician-Russian chronicle. 6 T. - 1874-1897.

== See also ==
- List of Eastern Catholic seminaries
