= List of Catholic dioceses in Bosnia and Herzegovina =

List of the four dioceses in Bosnia and Herzegovina

The Roman Catholic Church in Bosnia and Herzegovina has one archdiocese, the Metropolitan Archdiocese of Vrhbosna, and the following three dioceses:

- Diocese of Banja Luka
- Diocese of Mostar-Duvno
- Diocese of Trebinje-Mrkan

In addition to those dioceses, there also exists a Military Ordinariate of Bosnia and Herzegovina (Vojni ordinarijat u Bosne i Hercegovine), which was established by Pope Benedict XVI in 2011.

It is also pastorally served by the (Croatian) sole Byzantine rite (Eastern Catholic) diocese of the Croatian (Greek) Catholic Church.

There is an Apostolic Nunciature to Bosnia and Hezegovina (papal diplomatic representation at embassy level) in Sarajevo, which also oversees matters related to Montenegro. The incumbent Nuncio is Francis Chullikatt, who was appointed in 2022.

Latin Catholic dioceses in Bosnia and Herzegovina: Archdiocese of Vrhbosna Diocese of Banja Luka Diocese of Mostar-Duvno Diocese of Trebinje-Mrkan Diocese of Gospić-Senj (Zavalje parish) Diocese of Šibenik (village Uništa)

== See also ==
- Greek Catholic Eparchy of Križevci: an eparchy (equivalent of a diocese in the Greek Catholic Church) which administers to believers in Bosnia and Herzegovina
- Roman Catholic Diocese of Duvno: a historical diocese which lasted from the 14th to the 19th centuries
- Ruthenian Catholic Apostolic Administration of Bosnia-Hercegovina: a short-lived (1914-1924) Eastern Catholic jurisdiction that covered Bosnia and Herzegovina
