= Ilija Hranilović =

Croatian Greek Catholic bishop (1850–1889)

- Eparch of Križevci
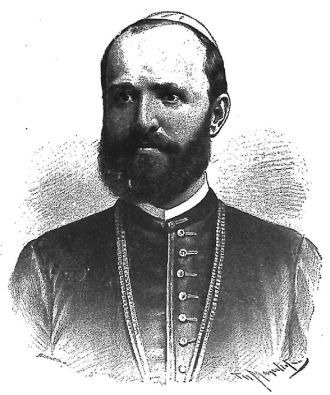
- Church: Greek Catholic Church of Croatia and Serbia
- Diocese: Eparchy of Križevci
- In office: 15 March 1883 – 20 March 1889
- Predecessor: Đuro Smičiklas
- Successor: Julije Drohobeczky

Orders
- Ordination: 25 April 1875 by Đuro Smičiklas
- Consecration: 22 April 1883 by Victor Mihaly de Apșa

Personal details
- Born: 3 October 1850 Sošice, Zagreb County, Kingdom of Croatia, Austrian Empire
- Died: 20 March 1889 (aged 38) Križevci, Bjelovar-Križevci County, Kingdom of Croatia-Slavonia, Transleithania, Austria-Hungary

Ilija Hranilović (3 October 1850 – 20 March 1889) was a Croatian Greek Catholic hierarch. He was the bishop from 1883 to 1889 of the Eastern Catholic Eparchy of Križevci.

Born in Sošice, Austrian Empire (present day – Croatia) in 1850, he was ordained a priest on 25 April 1875 for the Eparchy of Križevci. Fr. Hranilović was the parish priest in Šid from 1876 to 1879.

He was confirmed as the Bishop by the Holy See on 15 March 1883. He was consecrated to the Episcopate on 22 April 1883. The principal consecrator was Bishop Victor Mihaly de Apșa.

He died in Križevci on 20 March 1889.

Catholic Church titles
| Preceded by Đuro Smičiklas | Eastern Catholic Bishop of Križevci; 1883–1889 | Succeeded by Julije Drohobeczky |
