= Janko Šimrak =

Croatian Greek Catholic hierarch

- Bishop of Križevci
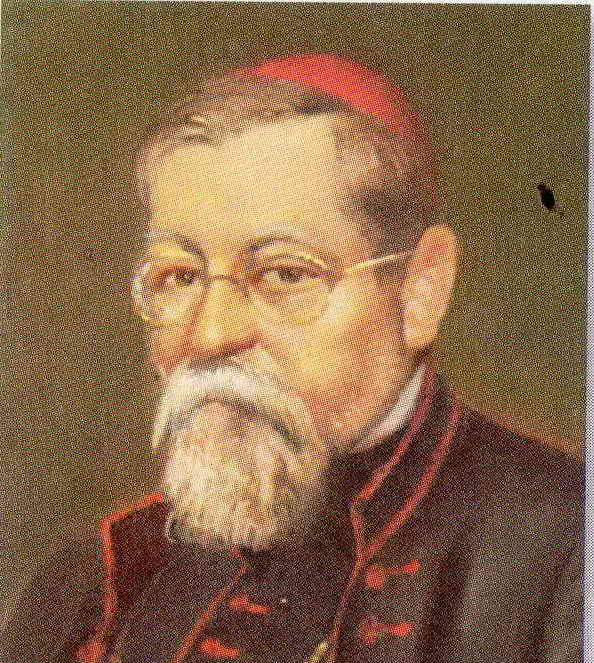
- Church: Greek Catholic Church of Croatia and Serbia
- Diocese: Eparchy of Križevci
- In office: 9 May 1942 – 9 August 1946
- Predecessor: Dionisije Njaradi
- Successor: Gabrijel Bukatko

Orders
- Ordination: 23 August 1908 by Julije Drohobeczky
- Consecration: 16 August 1942 by Ivan Buchko

Personal details
- Born: 29 May 1883 Šimraki, Kingdom of Croatia-Slavonia, Transleithania, Austria-Hungary
- Died: 9 August 1946 (aged 63) Križevci, PR Croatia, Federal People's Republic of Yugoslavia

Janko Šimrak (29 May 1883 – 9 August 1946) was a Croatian Greek Catholic hierarch. He was Apostolic Administrator from 1941 to 1942 and bishop from 1942 to 1946 of the Eastern Catholic Eparchy of Križevci.

== Life ==
Born in Šimraki, near Samobor, Austria-Hungary (present day – Croatia) in 1883, he was ordained a priest on 23 August 1908 for the Eparchy of Križevci. Fr. Šimrak was the spiritual director and then prefect of the Greek Catholic Seminary in Zagreb from 1908 to 1935.

In 1941 he became Apostolic Administrator and was appointed by the Holy See an Eparchial Bishop on 9 May 1942. He was consecrated to the Episcopate on 16 August 1942. The principal consecrator was Bishop Ivan Bucko, and the principal co-consecrator was Blessed Archbishop Alojzije Stepinac.

He died in Križevci on 9 August 1946.

Catholic Church titles
Preceded by Dionisije Njaradi	Greek Catholic Bishop of Križevci; 1942–1946	Succeeded by Gabrijel Bukatko as Ap. Administrator
