= Konstantin Stanić =

- Eaprch of Križevci
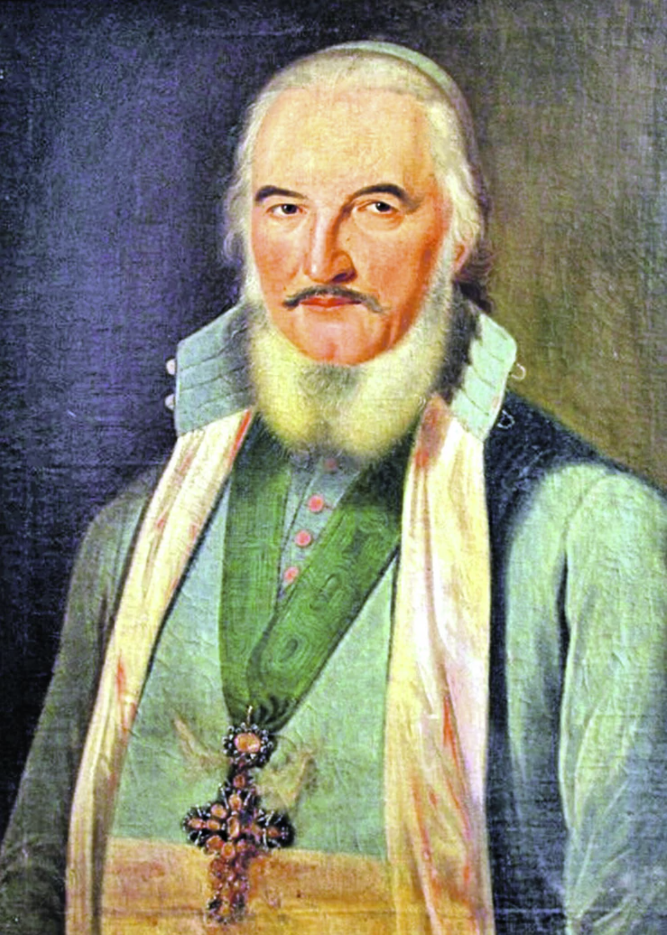
- Portrait of Stanić by Arsenije Teodorović
- Church: Greek Catholic Church of Croatia and Serbia
- Diocese: Eparchy of Križevci
- In office: 15 March 1815 – 31 July 1830
- Predecessor: Silvestar Bubanović
- Successor: Gabrijel Smičiklas

Orders
- Ordination: 15 September 1782
- Consecration: 10 September 1815 by Samuil Vulcan

Personal details
- Born: 18 November 1757 Mrzlo Polje Žumberačko (near Žumberak), Zagreb County, Kingdom of Croatia, Habsburg Empire
- Died: 31 July 1830 (aged 72) Križevci, Križevci County, Kingdom of Croatia, Austrian Empire

Konstantin Stanić (18 November 1757 – 31 July 1830) was a Croatian Greek Catholic hierarch. He was the bishop from 1815 to 1830 of the Eastern Catholic Eparchy of Križevci.

Born in Mrzlo Polje Žumberačko, Habsburg monarchy (present day – Croatia) in 1757, he was ordained a priest on 15 September 1782 for the Eparchy of Križevci. Fr. Stanić was the Rector of the Greek Catholic Seminary in Zagreb from 1782 to 1785 and again from 1807 to 1809.

He was confirmed as the bishop by the Holy See on 15 March 1815. He was consecrated to the Episcopate on 10 September 1815. The principal consecrator was Bishop Samuil Vulcan.

He died in Križevci on 31 July 1830.

Catholic Church titles
Preceded by Silvestar Bubanović	Eastern Catholic Bishop of Križevci; 1815–1830	Succeeded by Gabrijel Smičiklas
