= Bastašić =

Bastašić is a surname. Notable people with the surname include:

- Jozafat Bastašić (1740–1793), Greek Catholic hierarch
- Lana Bastašić (born 1986), Bosnian and Serbian writer, novelist and translator
