= Grabarak =

- Village
- Location within Croatia
- Coordinates: 45°41′N 15°41′E
- Country: Croatia

Area
  - Total: 3.1 km^{2} (1.2 sq mi)

Population (2021)
  - Total: 3
  - Density: 0.97/km^{2} (2.5/sq mi)
- Time zone: UTC+1 (CET)
  - Summer (DST): UTC+2 (CEST)

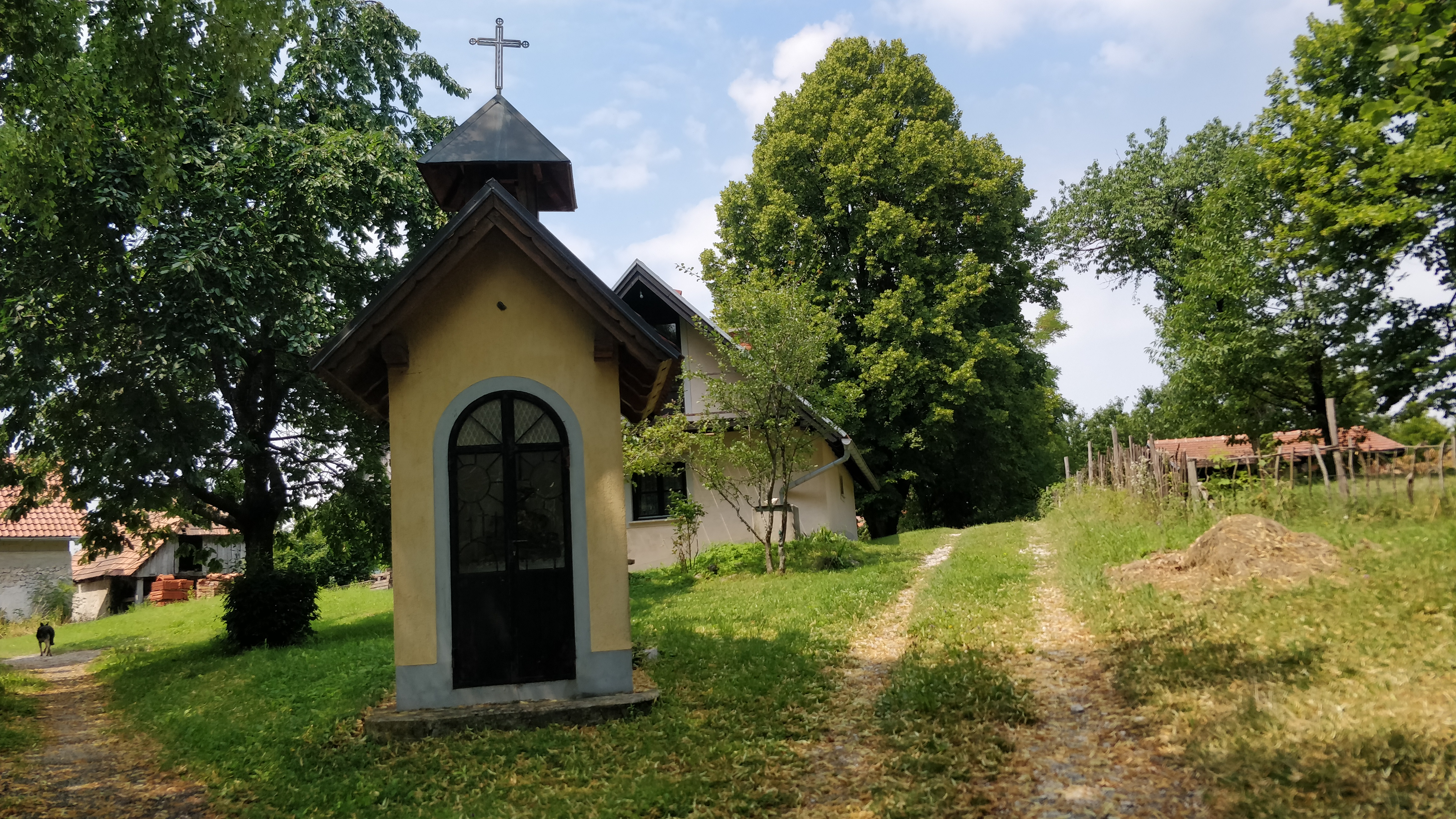
Chapel in Grabarak

Grabarak is an uninhabited settlement in Croatia.

Silvestar Bubanović, O.S.B.M. (1754 – 1810), the 3rd Greek-Catholic Bishop of Križevci, was born in Grabarak.
