= Drašći Vrh =

- Village
- Location within Croatia
- Coordinates: 45°45′N 15°30′E
- Country: Croatia

Area
  - Total: 3.2 km^{2} (1.2 sq mi)

Population (2021)
  - Total: 17
  - Density: 5.3/km^{2} (14/sq mi)
- Time zone: UTC+1 (CET)
  - Summer (DST): UTC+2 (CEST)

Drašći Vrh is a naselje (settlement) in the municipality of Žumberak, Zagreb County, Croatia and belongs to the Greek Catholic parish of Pećno. According to the 1948 census, Drašći Vrh had 130 inhabitants, and in 1981 it had 72 inhabitants. According to the 2011 census, it has 22 inhabitants.

Here was born Jozafat Bastašić, O.S.B.M. (1740 – 1793), second Greek-Catholic Bishop of Križevci
