= Nikola Kekić =

Croatian Greek Catholic hierarch (born 1943)

The Right Reverend Nikola Kekić
- Eparch of Križevci
- Church: Croatian Greek Catholic Church
- Diocese: Eparchy of Križevci
- Appointed: May 25, 2009
- Term ended: March 18, 2019
- Predecessor: Slavomir Miklovš
- Successor: Milan Stipić

Orders
- Ordination: November 1, 1970 (Priest)
- Consecration: July 4, 2009 (Bishop) by Slavomir Miklovš

Personal details
- Born: 18 January 1943 (age 83) Žumberak, Independent State of Croatia (modern Croatia)

Nikola Kekić (born January 18, 1943) is a Croatian Greek Catholic hierarch, who served as the bishop of the Greek-Catholic Eparchy of Križevci.

== Childhood and education ==
Nikola Kekić was born in 1943 in the village of Stari Grad Žumberački, in the Croatian Žumberak. He comes from a Croatian family. Kekic was baptized in the Greek Catholic Church of Peter and Paul in Mrzlo Polje, Ivančna Gorica. The primary school years spent in Nicholas Kekic Sošice and Ilok. From September 1, 1956 was his first four years of education in Greek Catholic Seminary in Zagreb with the traditional visit to the local grammar school. The school was for another four years in Zagreb's Franciscan Order, where he obtained his graduation in 1963.

== Study ==
From September 23, 1963 to March 10, 1965 contributed Kekic from his military service in Yugoslavia. In the same year Nicholas Kekic begins with the theological and philosophical studies at the Catholic Faculty of Zagreb. The diocesan bishop of the diocese in 1967 Križevci gave him permission to continue his studies at the Pontifical Urban University in Rome. During his studies Kekic also visited the Ukrainian Pontifical College of Saint Josaphat in Rome.

== Ordination ==
Nicholas Kekic was ordained on November 1, 1970 by the Greek-Catholic bishop of the diocese of Križevci Gabrijel Bukatko, in the Greek-Catholic Church of St. Peter and Paul in Sošice. In December 1970 he was with the pastoral leadership of the Greek-Catholic parish of St. Peter and Paul in charge Mrzlo Polje. It was followed in December 1972 appointment as head of the "Greek-Catholic center" in Karlovac. His pastoral activities began in the time Kekic temporarily continued in the Greek-Catholic parishes, "Annunciation" in Pribić and "Assumption" in Pećno.

== Further Studies ==
In 1977 Nicholas Kekic stayed again in Rome. He attended the Pontifical Croatian College of St. Jerome in Rome and continued his studies in church history at the Pontifical Oriental Institute and ended it with the receipt of the degree of Master of Arts.

== Return ==
After returning from Rome Kekic again became head of the "Greek-Catholic center" in Karlovac. From November 1984 he was appointed vice rector of the Greek Catholic Seminary in Zagreb, ibid Kekic took over on July 1, 1990 as rector of this. From December 1, 1984 he was by the decree of the Diocese of Križevci senior pastor of the Greek-Catholic parish of St. Cyril and Methodius, also in Zagreb. Nicholas Kekic is on December 1, 1988 executive dean of the deanery of the Diocese of Križevci.

From the December 8, 2003 was for the Bishop of Križevci Slavomir Miklovš the duties of a Konsultators, while he was a member of the presbyters of the diocese and Liturgierat Križevci. For years, Nicholas Kekic with the duties of a church in the diocese archivist Križevci been commissioned. Since September 1998, he headed Nicholas Kekic in Catholic radio on "Radio Maria" the program "From the heritage of the Greek-Catholic Christians," he also was the organizer of all radio and television broadcasts Greek Catholic church services in Croatia. Kekic 1999, a senior editor and publisher of the Greek-Catholic church newspaper "Žumberački Krijes". Nicholas Kekic is fluent in his native Croatian, Italian, Ukrainian and German.

Pope Benedict XVI. appointed on May 25, 2009 Nicholas Kekic at the age of sixty-six years as bishop of Križevci. The consecration ceremony took place on July 4, 2009 in the Greek-Catholic Cathedral of the Most Holy Trinity in Križevci place. Principal consecrator was Bishop Emeritus of Križevci Slavomir Miklovš. Co-consecrators were the Apostolic Nuncio to Croatia Mario Roberto Cassari and the Roman Catholic Archbishop of Zagreb, Josip Cardinal Bozanić.
