= Plavci =

Plavci may refer to:

- Plavci (band), a Czech pop folk and country music band
- Plavci, Croatia, a village in Žumberak
