= Kričke, Šibenik-Knin County =

Coordinates: 43°49′34″N 16°12′59″E

Kričke
- Village
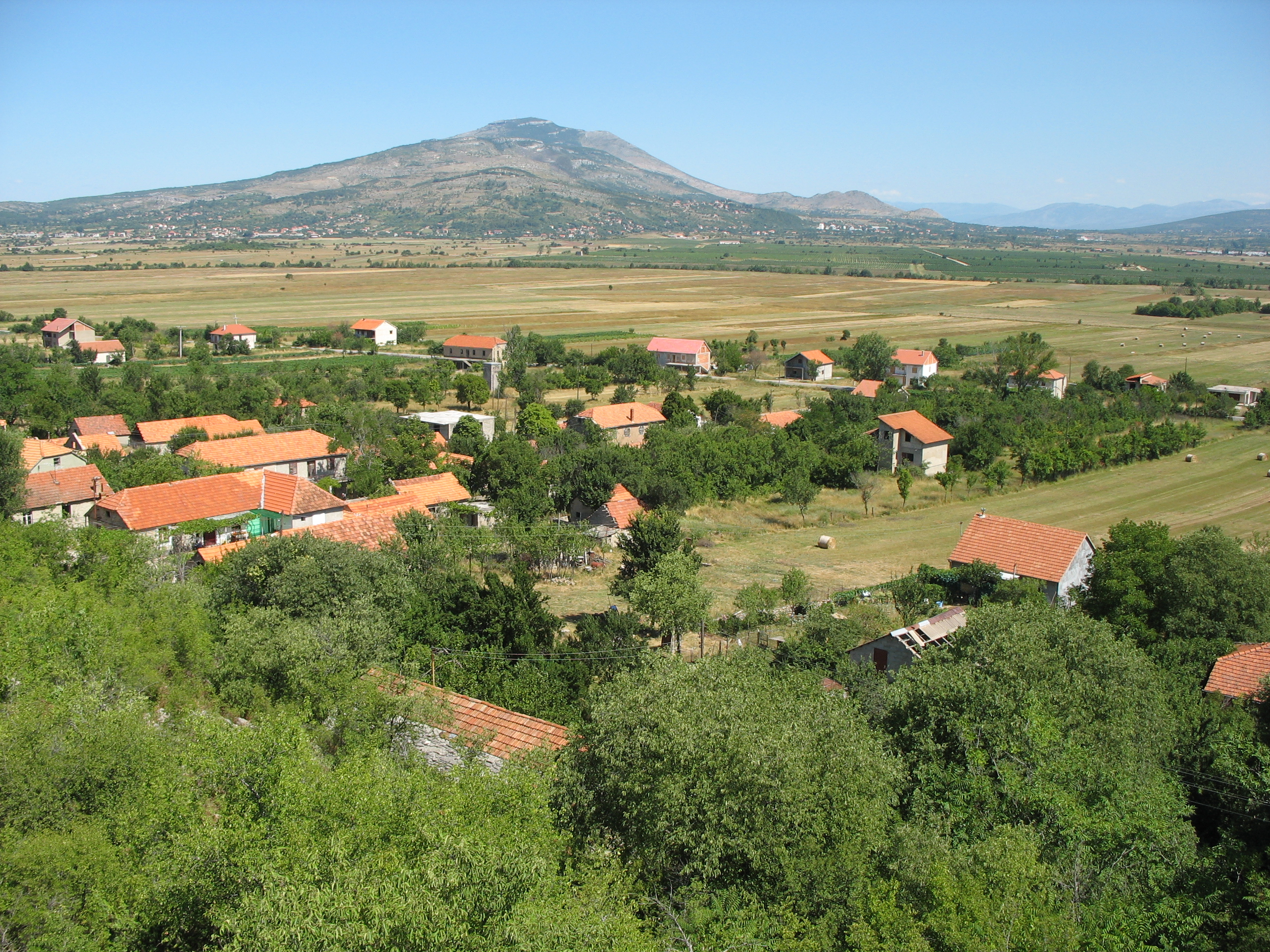
- Interactive map of Kričke
- Country: Croatia
- County: Šibenik-Knin County
- Municipality: Drniš

Area
  - Total: 16.8 km^{2} (6.5 sq mi)

Population (2021)
  - Total: 185
  - Density: 11.0/km^{2} (28.5/sq mi)
- Time zone: UTC+1 (CET)
  - Summer (DST): UTC+2 (CEST)

Kričke (Serbian Cyrillic: Кричке) is a village near Drniš, in Šibenik-Knin County, Croatia. The village is situated 3 km southeast from Drniš, in Petrovo field, beneath Moseć mountain. It is 5 km long in direction NW-SE. Kričke has a shape of line in the contact of field and mountain. It is situated on the river Čikola.

During the Croatian War of Independence, Kričke was the southernmost point of internationally unrecognized Republic of Serbian Krajina in period between September 1991 and August 1995. The village is located on the D56 state route.

The village was home to a Greek Catholic church of the Eparchy of Križevci. The church was devastated by Partisan forces in 1942.

In village there are 3 churches: Roman Catholic Church of Queen of Peace (1990), Greek Catholic Church of Intercession of the Theotokos (1836), and Serbian Orthodox Church of St. George (1727) which is the oldest but its dating of building by Nikodim Milaš is doubtful, possibly being renovation of a medieval Roman Catholic church.
