= Glušinja =

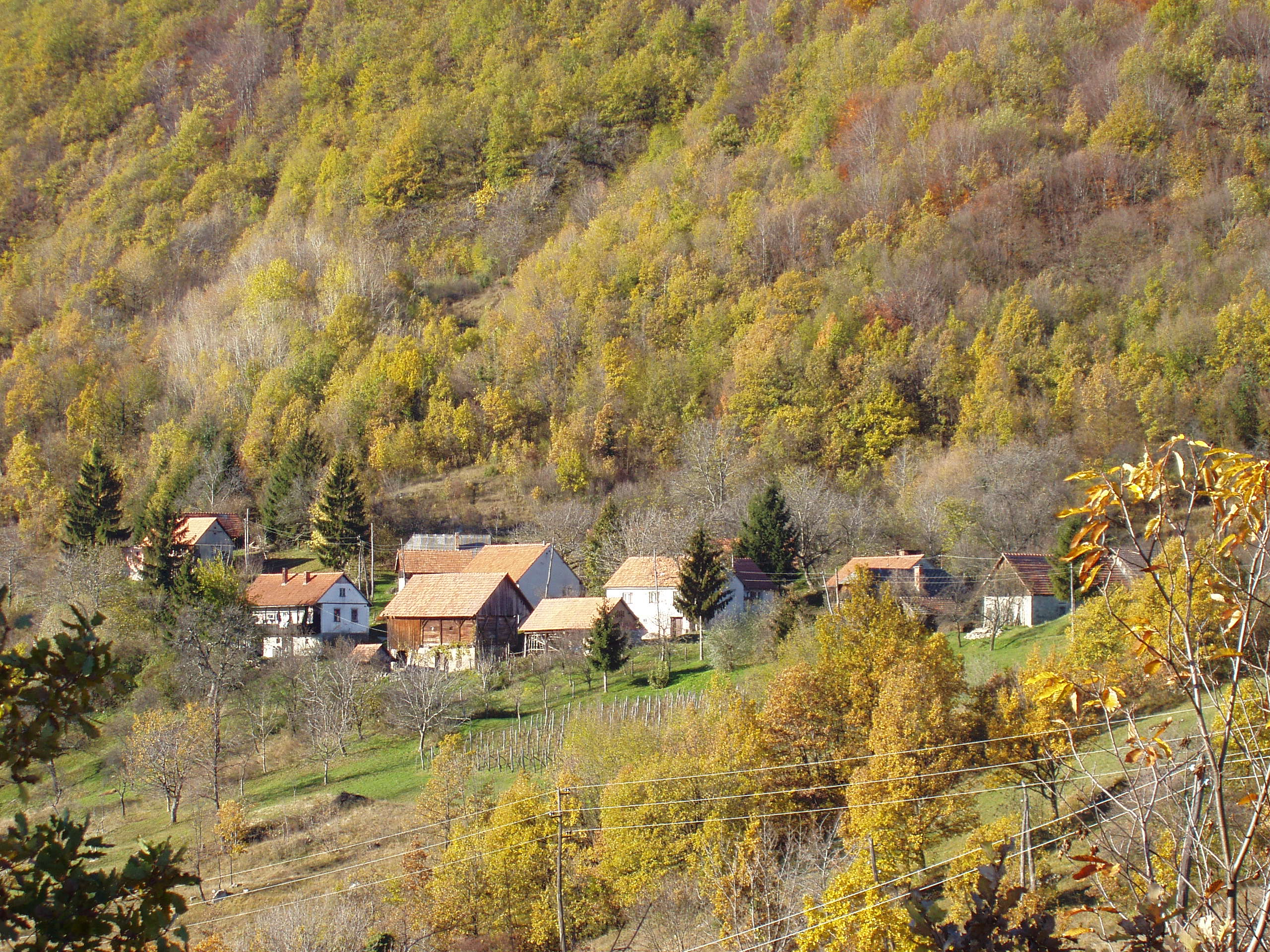

- Location within Croatia
- Coordinates: 45°42′N 15°28′E

Area
  - Total: 0.8 km^{2} (0.31 sq mi)

Population (2021)
  - Total: 14
  - Density: 18/km^{2} (45/sq mi)
- Time zone: Central European Time
- Postal code: 10455
- Area code: (+385) 10

Glušinja is a naselje (settlement) in the municipality of Žumberak, Zagreb County, Croatia.

In 1835, Glušinja had 7 houses and 83 inhabitants.

Glušinja had 22 inhabitants according to the census in 2011.

The Greek Catholic parish church of Saints Peter and Paul from the 17th century is located near Glušinja.

Glušinja is located 14 km from Kostanjevac, at an altitude of 557 meters. There are two old houses in Glušinja that reflect the traditional style of Žumberak architecture.
