= Đuro Smičiklas =

Greek-Catholic hierarch

- Eparch of Križevci
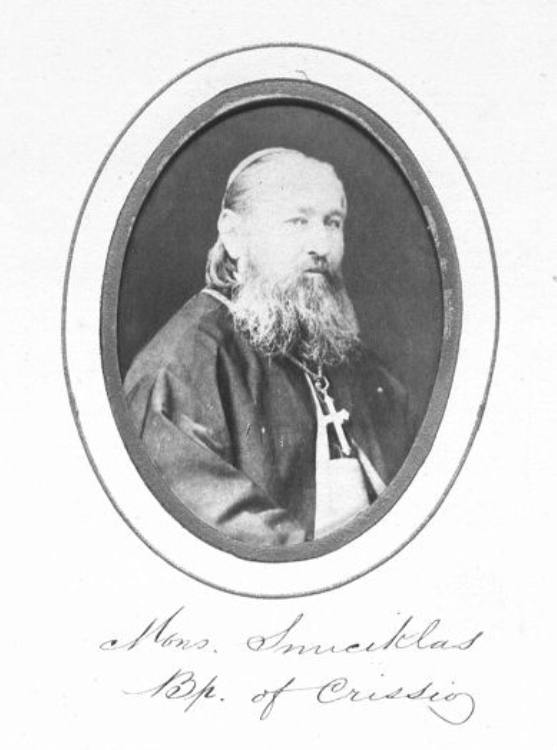
- Church: Greek Catholic Church of Croatia and Serbia
- Diocese: Eparchy of Križevci
- In office: 21 December 1857 – 20 April 1881
- Predecessor: Gabrijel Smičiklas
- Successor: Ilija Hranilović

Orders
- Ordination: 11 April 1841
- Consecration: 21 March 1858 by Alexandru Sterca-Șuluțiu

Personal details
- Born: 14 December 1815 Reštovo, Kamanje, Zagreb County, Kingdom of Croatia, Austrian Empire
- Died: 20 April 1881 (aged 65) Križevci, Križevci County, Kingdom of Croatia-Slavonia, Transleithania, Austria-Hungary

Đuro Smičiklas (14 December 1815 – 20 April 1881) was a Greek-Catholic hierarch, the bishop from 1857 to 1881 of the Eastern Catholic Eparchy of Križevci (today part of the Greek Catholic Church of Croatia and Serbia).

Born in Reštovo, near Sošice, Austrian Empire (now Croatia) in 1815, he was ordained a priest on 11 April 1841 for the Eparchy of Križevci. Fr. Smičiklas was the parish priest in Novi Sad from 1849 to 1852 and canon in the Križevci Greek Catholic Cathedral from 1852 to 1857.

He was confirmed as the Bishop by the Holy See on 21 December 1857. He was consecrated to the Episcopate on 21 March 1858. The principal consecrator was Archbishop Alexandru Sterca-Șuluțiu.

He died in Križevci on 20 April 1881.

== See also ==
- Catholic Church in Croatia

== Annotations ==
- His name was also rendered Juraj Smičiklas and Hungarian: Smiciklas György.

Catholic Church titles
Preceded by Gabrijel Smičiklas	Eastern Catholic Bishop of Križevci; 1857–1881	Succeeded by Ilija Hranilović
