= Church of Queen of Peace, Kričke =

Church of Queen of Peace
- Crkva Kraljice Mira
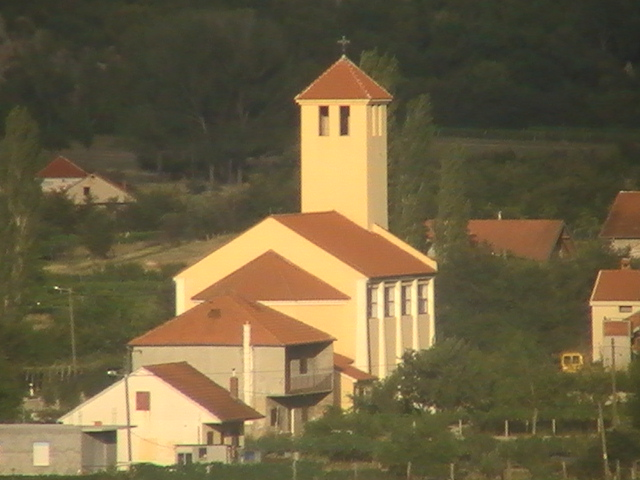

- Location within Croatia
- 43°49′01″N 16°13′01″E
- Location: Kričke, Drniš
- Country: Croatia
- Denomination: Roman Catholic

History
- Dedication: Our Lady of Peace

Architecture
- Functional status: Active
- Architect: Ivo Sorić
- Groundbreaking: 1989
- Completed: 1990

Administration
- Diocese: Diocese of Šibenik
- Deanery: Drniš Deanery

The Church of Queen of Peace (Croatian: Crkva Kraljice Mira) is a Roman Catholic church in Kričke, Croatia.

== History ==
Construction of the church began in 1989. It was projected by Zadar architect Ivo Sorić. On 31 May 1990 the church was dedicated. The whole complex consisted of the church, a pastoral center, sacristy and sanitary facilities. A bell tower which was 17 meters high, was also built.

On 28 August 1992, during the Croatian War of Independence, the church was mined and damaged by rebel Serbs.

In 1998 and 1999 it was rebuilt with a new bell tower, which is 28 meters high.
