= Gabrijel Bukatko =

Serbian Catholic figure (1913 - 81)

- Archbishop of Belgrade
- Church: Greek Catholic Church of Croatia and Serbia
- Archdiocese: Archdiocese of Belgrade
- In office: 24 March 1964 – 4 March 1980
- Predecessor: Josip Ujčić
- Successor: Alojz Turk
- Previous posts: Apostolic Administrator of Križevci (1953-1960, 1961-1981); Apostolic Administrator of Jugoslavenska Banat (1964-1971); Coadjutor Apostolic Administrator of Jugoslavenska Banat (1961-1964); Titular Archbishop of Mocissus (1961-1964); Coadjutor Archbishop of Belgrade (1961-1964); Bishop of Križevci (1960-1961); Titular Bishop of Severiana (1952-1960)

Orders
- Ordination: 2 April 1939 by Dionisije Njaradi
- Consecration: 27 April 1952 by Josip Ujčić

Personal details
- Born: 27 January 1913 Donji Andrijevci, Kingdom of Croatia-Slavonia, Transleithania, Austria-Hungary
- Died: 19 October 1981 (aged 68) Vrbas, SR Serbia, SFR Yugoslavia

Gabrijel Bukatko (27 January 1913 – 19 October 1981) was a Serbian Roman Catholic prelate and Croatian Greek Catholic hierarch. He was an Apostolic Administrator and Eparchial Bishop from 1950 to 1981 of the Eastern Catholic Eparchy of Križevci and a Coadjutor Archbishop from 1961 to 1964 and an archbishop from 1964 to 1980 of the Roman Catholic Archdiocese of Belgrade.

== Biography ==
Born in Donji Andrijevci, Austria-Hungary (present-day Croatia) in the Ruthenian family of Dionisije and Julija Bukatko in 1913, he was ordained a priest on 2 April 1939 by Bishop Dionisije Njaradi for the Eparchy of Križevci. Fr. Bukatko was the Rector of Cathedral of the Holy Trinity in Križevci from 1941 to 1950.

He was appointed by the Holy See an apostolic administrator of Križevci on 1950 and two years later, on 23 February 1952 also was named as titular bishop of Severiana. He was consecrated to the Episcopate on 27 April 1952. The principal consecrator was Archbishop Josip Ujčić, and the principal co-consecrators were Bishop Josip Lach and Bishop Stjepan Bäuerlein in Zagreb. He was appointed eparchial bishop of the Eparchy of Križevci on 22 July 1960, but the next year, on 2 March 1961, become a coadjutor archbishop and on 24 March 1964 an archbishop of the Roman Catholic Archdiocese of Belgrade. Archbishop Bukatko continued to govern the Eparchy of Križevci as an apostolic administrator until his death. Also he was an apostolic administrator of Apostolic Administration of Banat from 1961 to 1971. He resigned as Archbishop of Belgrade on 4 March 1980.

He participated in the Second Vatican Council as a Council Father in 1960th. He died in Vrbas on 19 October 1981.

Catholic Church titles
Preceded by Janko Šimrak	Apostolic Administrator of the Eparchy of Križevci; 1950–1960	Succeeded by himself as Eparchial Bishop
Preceded by himself as Apostolic Administrator	Bishop of Križevci; 1960–1961	Succeeded by himself as Apostolic Administrator
Preceded by himself as Eparchial Bishop	Apostolic Administrator of the Eparchy of Križevci; 1961–1981	Succeeded by Slavomir Miklovš
Preceded by Josip Ujčić	Roman Catholic Archdiocese of Belgrade; 1964–1980	Succeeded by Alojz Turk
Preceded by Josip Ujčić	Apostolic Administration of Banat; 1961–1971 (as Apostolic Administrator)	Succeeded by Tamás Jung
