= Milan Stipić =

Croatian Greek Catholic hierarch (born 1978)

The Right Reverend Milan Stipić
- Bishop of Greek Catholic Eparchy of Križevci
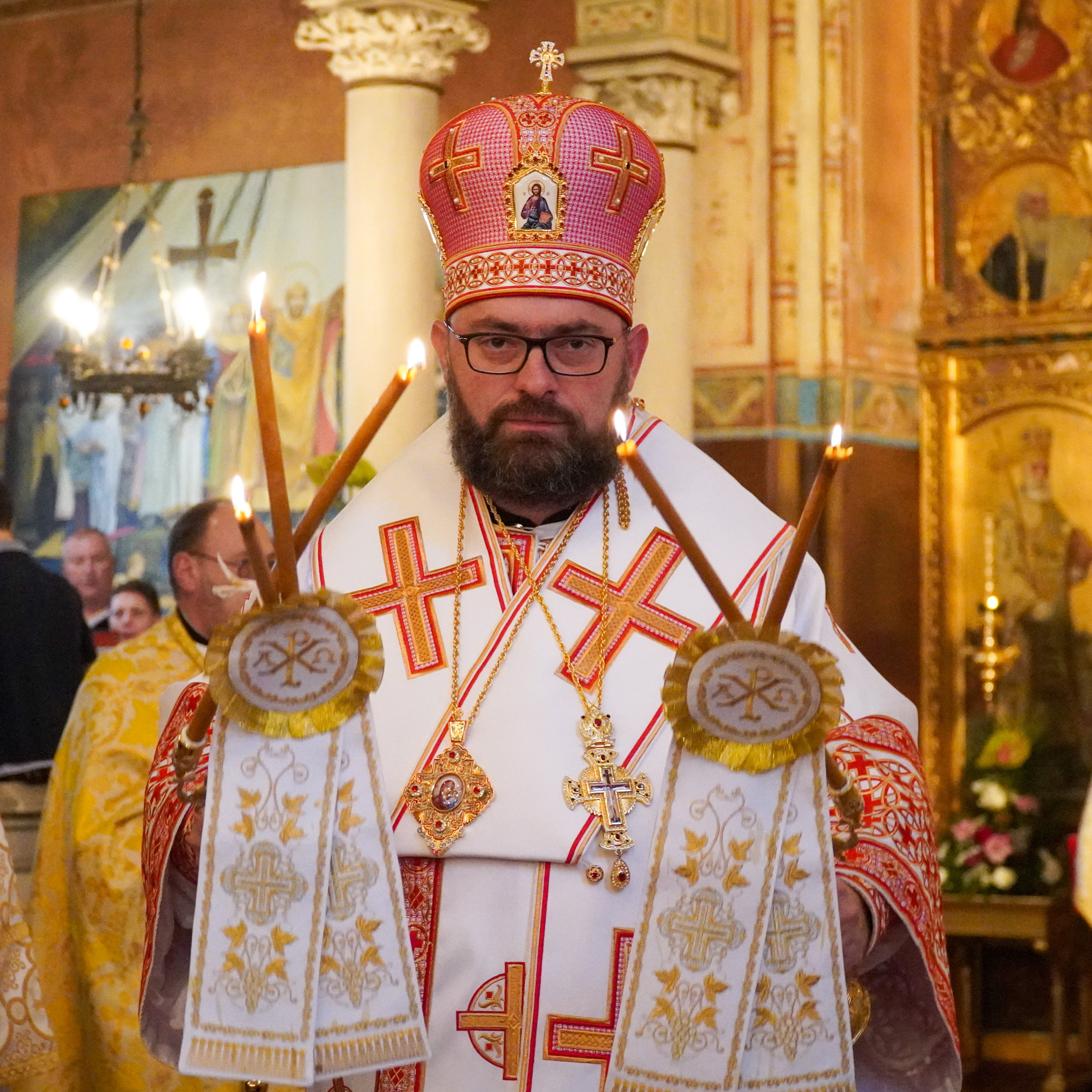
- Church: Greek Catholic Church of Croatia and Serbia
- Appointed: 8 September 2020
- Predecessor: Nikola Kekić
- Successor: Incumbent
- Other posts: Parish priest in Jastrebarsko (2012–2019), Apostolic Administrator of Greek Catholic Eparchy of Križevci (2019–2020)

Orders
- Ordination: 18 October 2003 (Priest) by Slavomir Miklovš
- Consecration: 17 October 2020 (Bishop) by Nikola Kekić

Personal details
- Born: Milan Stipić; 28 December 1978 (age 47) Bosanski Novi, SR Bosnia and Herzegovina, SFR Yugoslavia
- Education: University of Zagreb
- Coat of arms

Bishop Milan Stipić (born 28 December 1978) is a Croatian Greek Catholic hierarch, who serves as Bishop of Greek Catholic Eparchy of Križevci since 8 September 2020. Previously he was an Apostolic Administrator of Greek Catholic Eparchy of Križevci since 18 March 2019 until 8 September 2020.

== Life ==
Fr. Stipić was born in Bosanski Novi, in the present-day Republika Srpska, Bosnia and Herzegovina to Croatian Latin Catholic parents. He spent his childhood in Lipik, where he was baptized. He attended elementary school in Lipik, but due to the war, continued in Zagreb and Čazma. After elementary school in 1993, he enrolled in the Archdiocesan Classical High School in Zagreb and began his priestly formation at the Inter-Diocesan Minor Seminary.

In 1997 he entered the Greek Catholic Seminary in Zagreb and studied at the Catholic Theological Faculty in University of Zagreb. He was ordained deacon on 8 November 2002 and priest on 18 October 2003, for the Greek Catholic Eparchy of Križevci. In the same year, he started serving pastoral work in the local Greek Catholic parishes.

In 2007 he received the title of proto-priest and took over the pastoral care of Greek Catholics in Dalmatia. Fr. Stipić served as a parish priest of Jastrebarsko from 2012 until 2019.

On18 March 2019, he was appointed by Pope Francis as an Apostolic Administrator of the then-vacant Greek Catholic Eparchy of Križevci without dignity of bishop. On 8 September 2020 was promoted to a rank of bishop, as Eparchial Bishop of Greek Catholic Eparchy of Križevci.

Catholic Church titles
Preceded by Nikola Kekić	Bishop of Greek Catholic Eparchy of Križevci; 2020–	Succeeded by Incumbent
