= Greek Catholic Co-Cathedral of Saints Cyril and Methodius, Zagreb =

Church building in Zagreb, Croatia

Coordinates: 45.815201°N 15.973311°E

Greek Catholic Co-cathedral of Saints Cyril and Methodius Grkokatolička konkatedrala Sv. Ćirila i Metoda
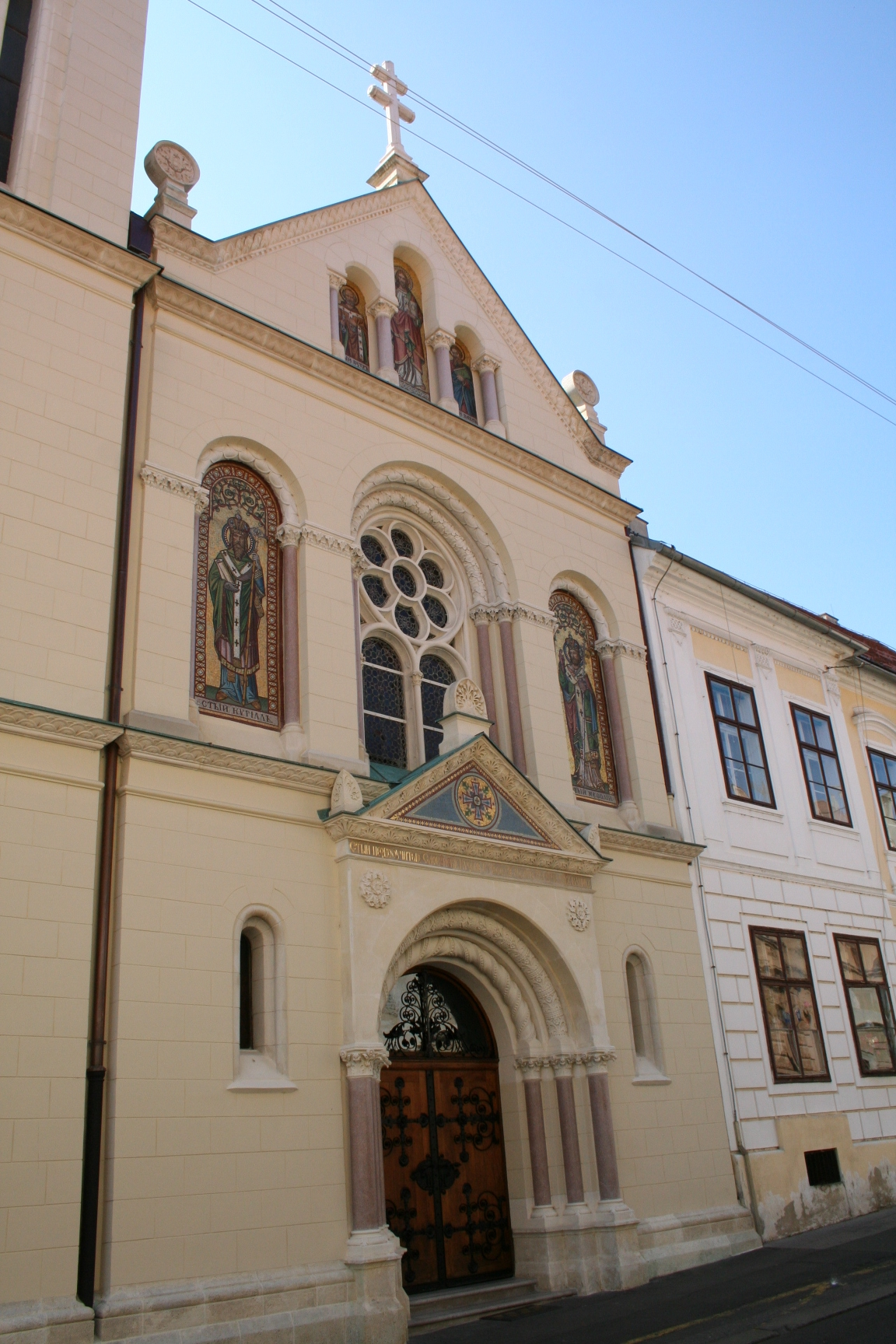
- Zagreb Greek Catholic Co-cathedral

Religion
- Affiliation: Greek Catholic
- District: Eparchy of Križevci
- Ecclesiastical or organizational status: Co-cathedral
- Patron: Saints Cyril and Methodius

Location
- Location: Zagreb, Croatia
- Interactive map of Greek Catholic Co-cathedral of Saints Cyril and Methodius; Grkokatolička konkatedrala Sv. Ćirila i Metoda

Architecture
- Architect: Hermann Bollé
- Type: Church
- Style: Historicism
- Completed: 1886

The Greek Catholic Co-cathedral of Saints Cyril and Methodius (Croatian: Grkokatolička konkatedrala Sv. Ćirila i Metoda) is the historicistic co-cathedral church of the Greek Catholic Eparchy of Križevci. It belongs to the Vicariate of Diocese of Žumberak-Križevci. It is located in the Street of St. Cyril and Methodius on the Upper Town in Zagreb, near St. Mark's Square.

== History ==
A Greek Catholic church and seminary (built in 1681) existed on the Upper Town before the 17th century. This church was intended for the Greek Catholic believers, mostly people from Žumberak Mountains, Uskoks and clerics that lived in and around Zagreb. It is not possible to determine when the Church was built because a fire that broke out in 1766 destroyed most of the Church's books that would give a precise date. This first church was dedicated to Basil the Great.

The current church dedicated to St. Cyril and Methodius was built in 1886 during the reign of Bishop Ilija Hranilović on the site of the former church of St. Basil. The parish uses the facilities of the Greek Catholic Seminary in Zagreb that is connected to the Church which gives room that serves as a parish office, and, since 1932, a hall with sacristy.

== The present church ==
The co-cathedral was designed by Hermann Bollé. It is built in the neo-Byzantine style of historicism. The co-cathedral owns a rich collection of paintings by Ivan Tišov, as well as icons by E.A. Bučevski and professor Nikola Mašić. There are three bells in the 50m high co-cathedral's belfry. Largest bell weights 782 kg and is dedicated to St. Cyril and Methodius, medium bell that weight 395 kg is dedicated to the Mother of God and small bell that weights 230 kg and is dedicated to Basil the Great. The Co-cathedral owns a precious cross for tetrapod, reliquary, and two capes, as well as set of kit icon mounted on wood for the cross.
