= Grič, Zagreb County =

Grič
- Location within Croatia
- Coordinates: 45°46′11.27″N 15°26′32.18″E
- Country: Croatia
- County: Zagreb County
- Municipality: Žumberak

Area
  - Total: 6.0 km^{2} (2.3 sq mi)

Population (2021)
  - Total: 7
  - Density: 1.2/km^{2} (3.0/sq mi)
- Time zone: UTC+1 (CET)
  - Summer (DST): UTC+2 (CEST)

Grič is a naselje (settlement) in the municipality of Žumberak, Zagreb County, Croatia. According to the 2011 census, it has 14 inhabitants.

The village of Grič is the highest populated place in Žumberak, at an altitude of 780 meters.
