= Dobriany, Stryi urban hromada, Stryi Raion, Lviv Oblast =

Rural locality in Lviv Oblast, Ukraine

Dobriany Добряни
- Village
- Location within Lviv Oblast Location within Ukraine
- Coordinates: 49°17′15″N 23°53′14″E
- Country: Ukraine
- Oblast: Lviv Oblast
- District: Stryi Raion
- Established: 1375

Area
  - Total: 1,903 km^{2} (735 sq mi)
- Elevation /(average value of): 285 m (935 ft)

Population
  - Total: 1,822
  - Density: 9,574/km^{2} (24,800/sq mi)
- Time zone: UTC+2 (EET)
  - Summer (DST): UTC+3 (EEST)
- Postal code: 82427
- Area code: +380 3245
- Website: село Добряни ^{(Ukrainian)}

Dobriany (Dobryany, Dobrjany) (Ukrainian: Добря́ни, old name — Дебрин, Добрини) is a village in Stryi Raion, Lviv Oblast in western Ukraine. It belongs to Stryi urban hromada, one of the hromadas of Ukraine. Local government is administered by Dobrianska village council. The population of the village is about 1822 people.

== Geography ==
The village is located near the Highway M06 (Ukraine) ( M 06) and is along the Stryi River at a distance 3 kilometres (1.9 mi) from the district center Stryi, 69 kilometres (43 mi) from the regional center of Lviv and 199 kilometres (124 mi) from Uzhhorod.
The village is situated on a hill along the Stryi River. During spring, when the river floods its banks, parts of the village get flooded due to its average elevation of 285 metres.

== History ==
The first mention of Dobriany dates from the year 1375. This is one of the oldest villages in Stryi District.

== Cult constructions and religion ==
The village has an architectural monument of local importance of Stryi Raion (Stryi district) – Church of St. Demetrios (stone) 1821 (2385 –м).

== Gallery ==
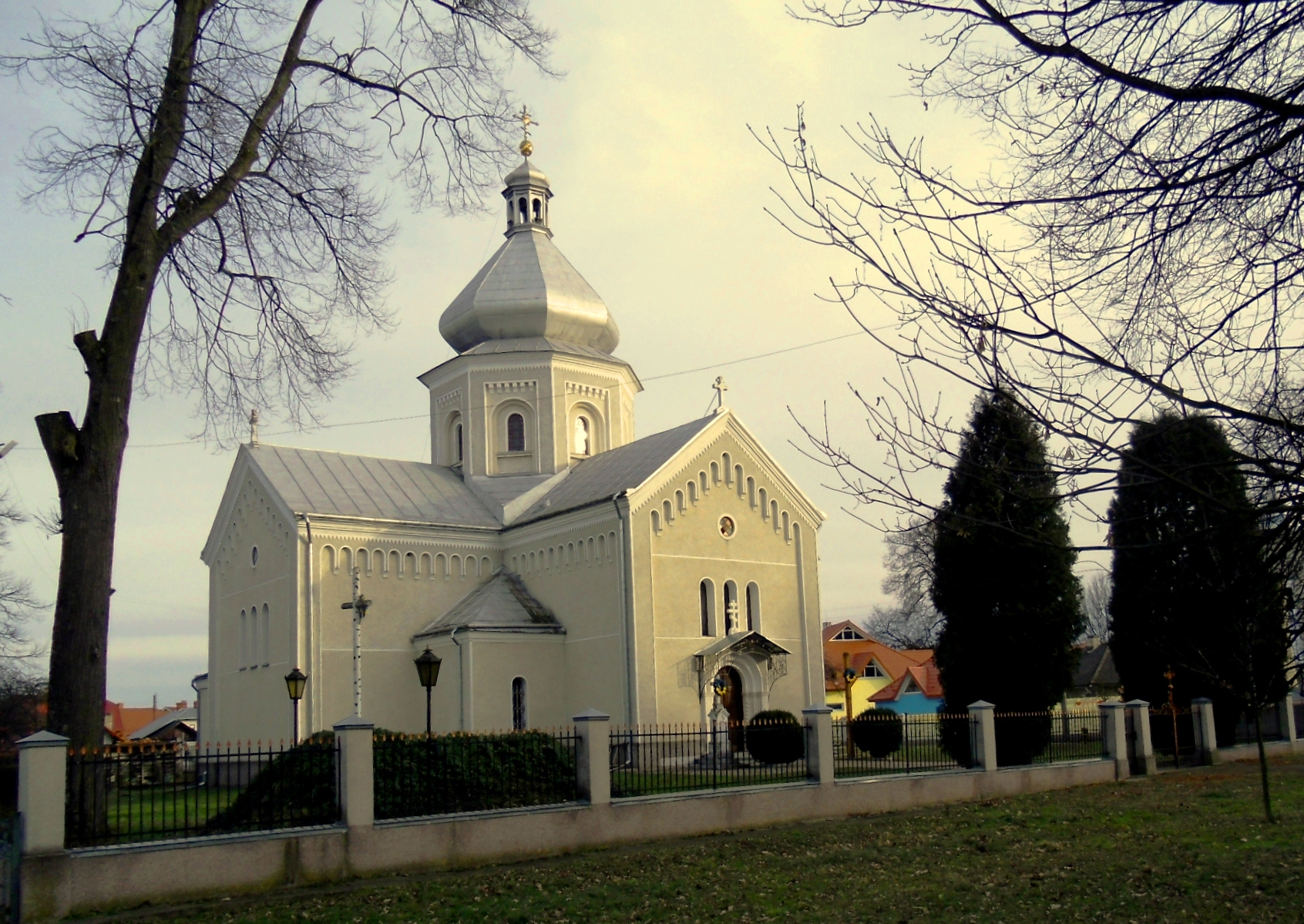
Church of St. Demetrios in the village Dobriany

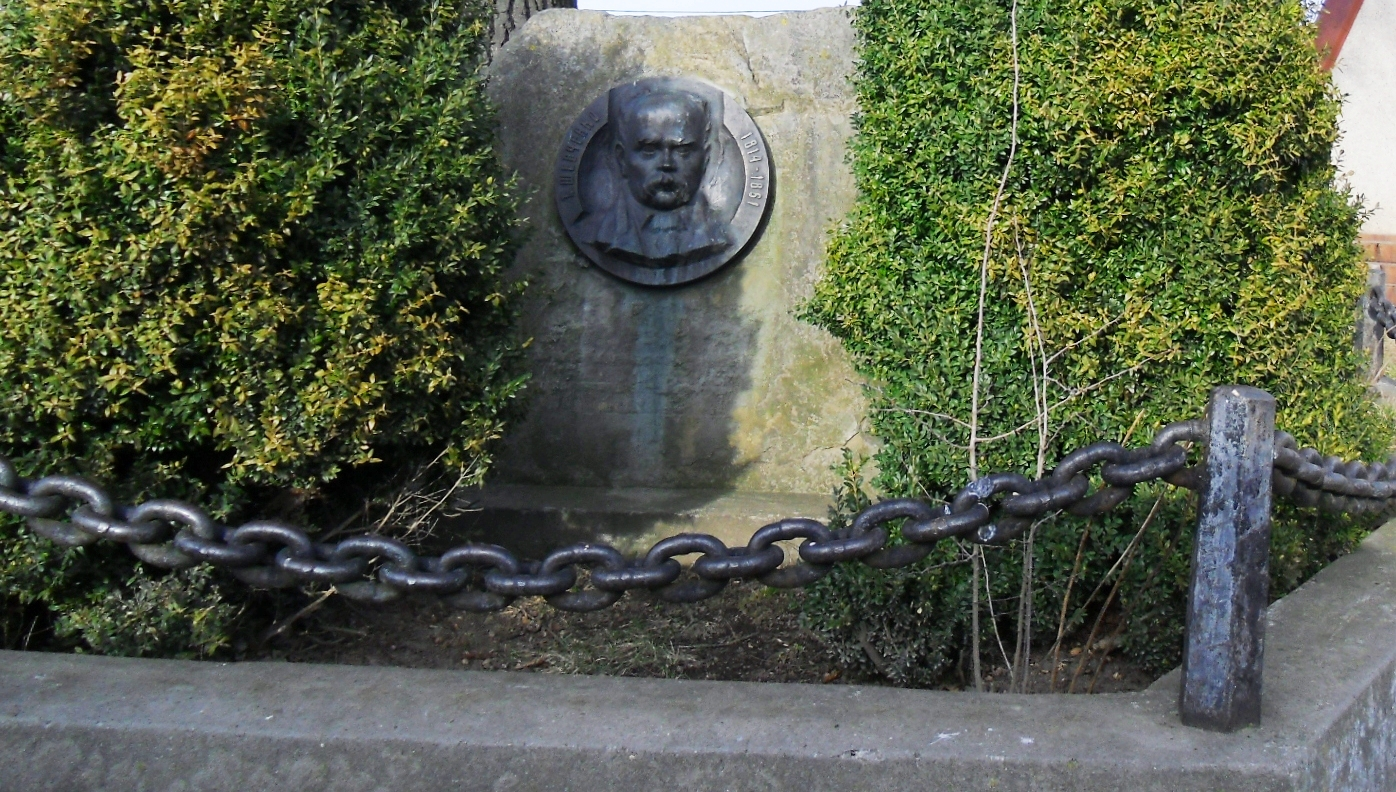
Memorable plate with bas-relief depicting Shevchenko

== Personalities ==
- Rev. Anton Petrushevych (1821, Dobriany – 1913, Lviv) – Ukrainian historian and philologist, Greek Catholic priest.
- Rev. Oleksiy Bazyuk (1873–1952) – Ukrainian Greek Catholic priest, Apostolic Administrator of Bosnia-Hercegovina (1914–1925).
