= Vasilije Božičković =

- Eparch of Križevci
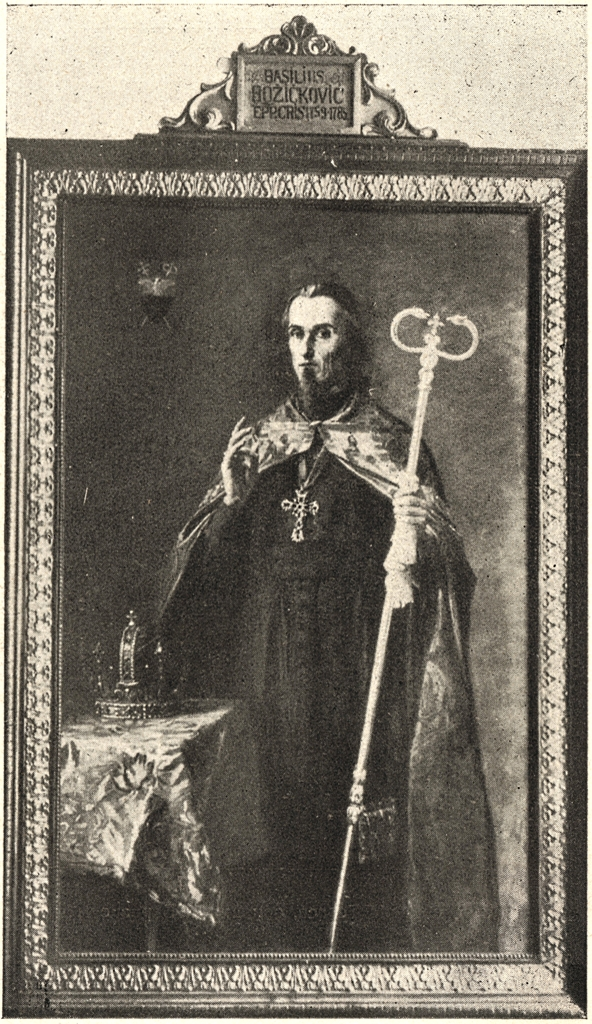
- Church: Croatian Greek Catholic Church
- Diocese: Eparchy of Križevci
- Appointed: 23 June 1777
- Term ended: 9 May 1785
- Successor: Josaphat Bastašić
- Other post: Eparch of Marča (1759-1777)

Orders
- Ordination: 1744 (Priest)
- Consecration: 11 Nov 1759 (Bishop) by M. Olsavszky

Personal details
- Born: 11 February 1719
- Died: 9 May 1785 (aged 66)

Trifun Vasilije Božičković, O.S.B.M. (or Latin: Basilius Bosicskovich, 1719–1785) was the last bishop of the Eparchy of Marča (1759–1777) and the first bishop of the Eparchy of Križevci from the erection in 1777 to his death in 1785.

== Life ==
Vasilije Božičković was born on 11 February 1719 in the village of Batinyan, near Zagreb. He entered in the monastic Order of Saint Basil the Great in 1741, and in the same year he was sent to study in the College of the Propaganda in Rome. He was ordained a priest in 1744. When in 1745 he got his doctorate in theology, he could not return in his monastery of Marča (located near Ivanić Grad) because it was taken to the Serbian Orthodox Church, so he was sent in Poland to teach philosophy. In 1752 he was chosen by his Basilian Order as representative of the Order in Rome.

On 4 September 1759 Božičković was appointed eparch (bishop) of Marča, i.e. apostolic vicar for the Greek Rite population under the Latin Archdiocese of Zagreb, succeeding to Gabrijel Palković, and on 11 November 1759 he was consecrated bishop in Máriapócs by M. Olsavszky, Eparch of Mukachevo.

On 17 June 1777, Pope Pius VI, on suggestion of the Habsburg monarch Empress Maria Theresa, erected the Greek Rite Eparchy of Križevci separating it from Latin Latin Archdiocese of Zagreb and superseding the previous Eparchy of Marča. Božičković, who played a prominent role in the erection of the eparchy, was chosen as first eparch, and so formally appointed on 23 June 1777.

Vasilije Božičković died on 9 May 1785, and he was buried in the church of Saint Mary in Gornji Tkalec.

== Notes ==
Catholic Church titles
Preceded by Gabrijel Palković	Vicar Apostolic of Marča; 1759–1777	Succeeded by himself, as first Eparchial Bishop
Preceded by himself, as last Vicar Apostolic	Eastern Catholic Bishop of Križevci; 1777–1785	Succeeded by Jozafat Bastašić
