= Hartje =

Naselje in Zagreb County, Croatia

- Location within Croatia
- Coordinates: 45°45′24.07″N 15°27′9.87″E
- Country: Croatia
- County: Zagreb County
- Municipality: Žumberak

Area
  - Total: 1.5 km^{2} (0.58 sq mi)

Population (2021)
  - Total: 27
  - Density: 18/km^{2} (47/sq mi)
- Time zone: UTC+1 (CET)
  - Summer (DST): UTC+2 (CEST)

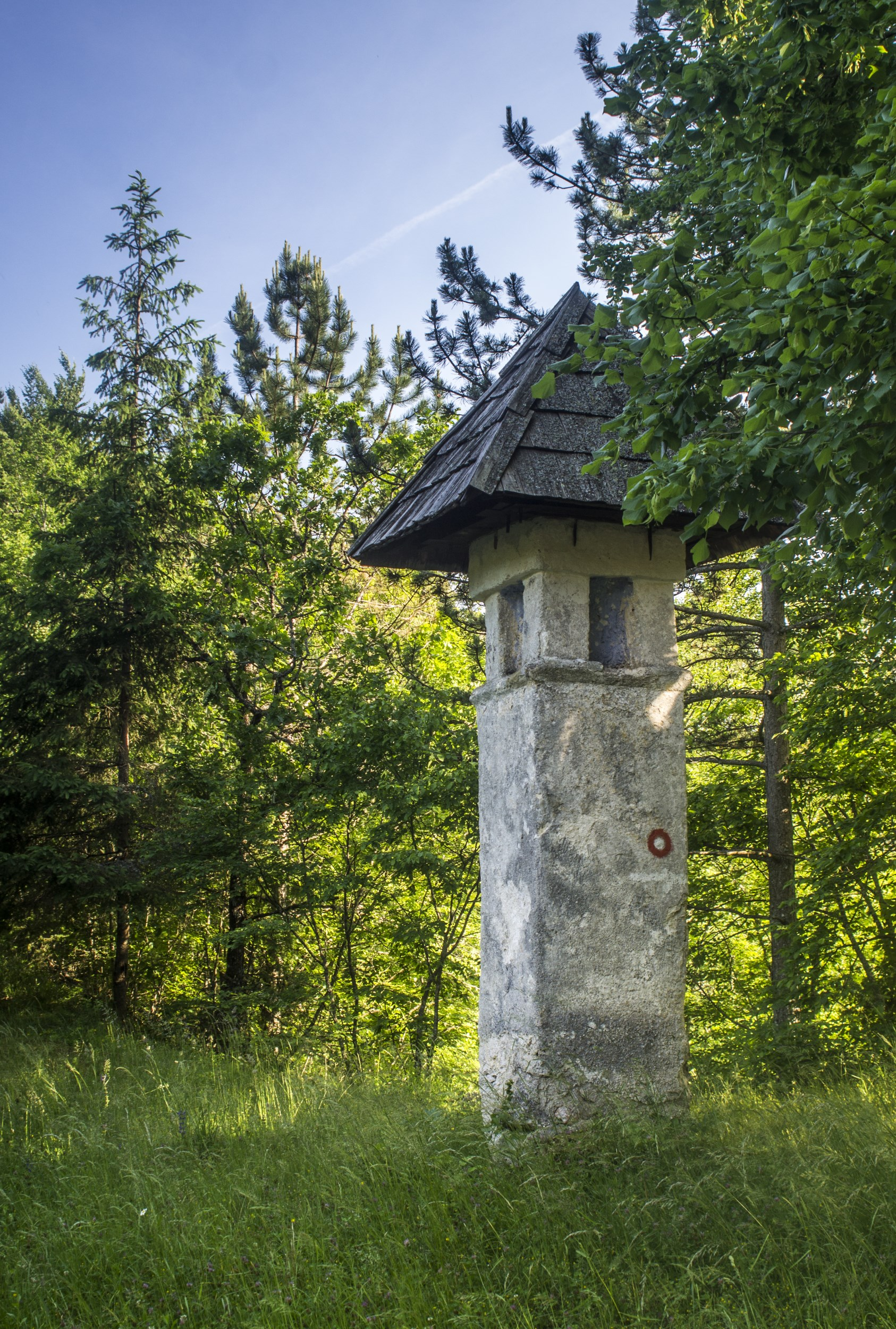
Hartje village, stone pier.

Hartje is a naselje (settlement) in the municipality of Žumberak, Zagreb County, Croatia. According to the 2011 census, it has 34 inhabitants. The family of Zagreb bishop Petar Petretić from the 17th century originates from Hartje. According to the data from the topography, in 1835 the village had 12 houses and 86 Catholic inhabitants.
