= Silvestar Bubanović =

Greek Roman Catholic bishop (1754–1810)

Silvestar Bubanović O.S.B.M.
- Eparch of Križevci
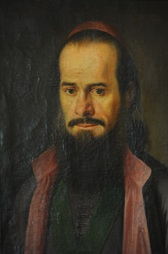
- Church: Greek Catholic Church of Croatia and Serbia
- Diocese: Eparchy of Križevci
- In office: 22 September 1795 – 14 June 1810
- Predecessor: Jozafat Bastašić
- Successor: Konstantin Stanić

Orders
- Ordination: 19 March 1778
- Consecration: 8 November 1795 by Andriy Bachynskyi

Personal details
- Born: 13 October 1754 Grabarak, Zagreb County, Kingdom of Croatia, Habsburg Empire
- Died: 14 June 1810 (aged 55) Križevci, Križevci County, Kingdom of Croatia, Austrian Empire

Silvestar Bubanović, O.S.B.M. (13 October 1754 – 14 June 1810) was a Greek Catholic hierarch. He was the bishop from 1795 to 1810 of the Eastern Catholic Eparchy of Križevci.

Born in Grabarak, Habsburg monarchy (present day – Croatia) in 1754, he was ordained a priest on 19 March 1778 as member of the Order of Saint Basil the Great. Fr. Bubanović was the Rector of the Greek Catholic Seminary in Zagreb from 1779 to 1780.

He was confirmed as the Bishop by the Holy See on 22 September 1795. He was consecrated to the Episcopate on 8 November 1795. The principal consecrator was Bishop Andriy Bachynskyi.

He died in Križevci on 14 June 1810.

Catholic Church titles
Preceded by Jozafat Bastašić	Eastern Catholic Bishop of Križevci; 1795–1810	Succeeded by Konstantin Stanić
