= Jozafat Bastašić =

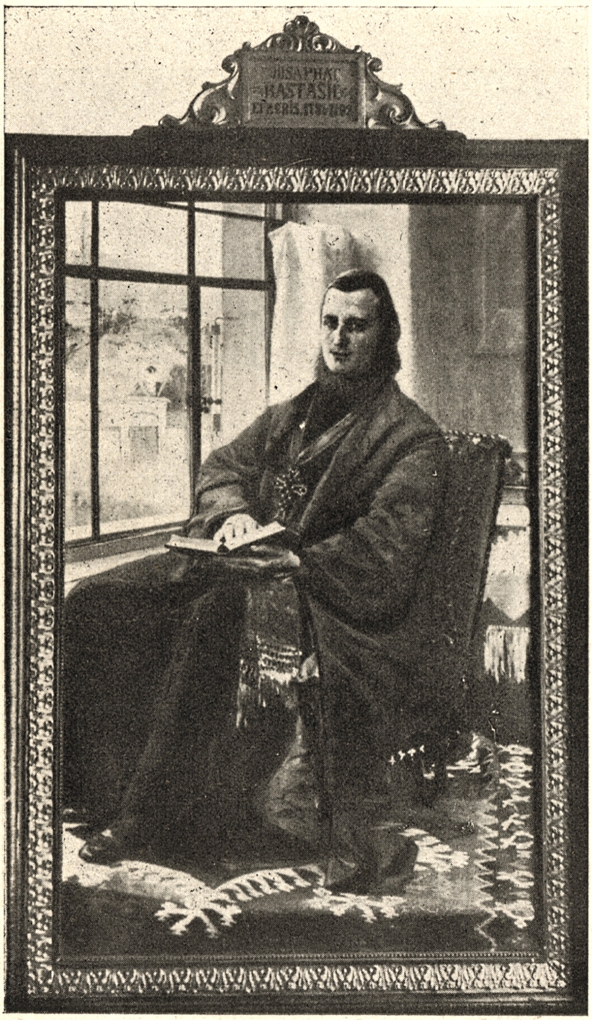
Jozafat Bastašić

Jozafat Bastašić, O.S.B.M. (1 May 1740 – 28 August 1793) was a Greek Catholic hierarch. He was the bishop from 1789 to 1793 of the Eastern Catholic Eparchy of Križevci.

== Life ==
Born in Drašći Vrh, Habsburg monarchy (present day Croatia) in 1740, he was ordained a priest on 1765 as member of the Order of Saint Basil the Great. Until 1775 Bastašić was the personal assistant of Vasilije Božičković and the Vicar General of the Epachy of Križevci from 1777 to 1788.

He was confirmed as a Bishop by the Holy See on 30 March 1789. He was consecrated to the Episcopate on 6 December 1790. The principal consecrator was Andriy Bachynskyi, and the principal co-consecrator was Ignațiu Darabant

He died in Šid on 28 August 1793.

== See also ==
- Catholic Church in Croatia

Catholic Church titles
Preceded by Vasilije Božičković	Eastern Catholic Bishop of Križevci; 1789–1793	Succeeded by Silvestar Bubanović
