= Ruthenian Catholic Apostolic Administration of Bosnia-Hercegovina =

The Ruthenian Catholic Apostolic Administration of Bosnia-Hercegovina was a short-lived (1914-1924) pre-diocesan Eastern Catholic jurisdiction, covering Bosnia and Hercegovina.

It was exempt, i.e. directly dependent on the Holy See, not part of any ecclesiastical province. It practiced the Byzantine Rite in Ruthenian language.

== History ==
- It was established in 1914 as 'permanent' Apostolic Administration of Bosna i Herzegovina (Croat language) / Bosnia and Herzegovina (English) / Bosnia et Herzegovina (Latin), on (then Austro-Hungarian imperial) territory previously served by the Greek Catholic Eparchy of Križevci. The see of an Apostolic Administrator was in Sarajevo (1914–1917) and after – in Banja Luka (1917–1925).
- Suppressed in 1925, its (after World War I Yugoslavian) territory being merged back into above Eparchy of Križevci,

having had a single incumbent :

- Father Oleksiy Bazyuk (1914 – 1925), no other hierarchs.

== See also ==
- List of Catholic dioceses in Bosnia and Herzegovina
- Greek Catholic Eparchy of Ruski Krstur, an eparchy for Pannonian Rusyns in Vojvodina elevated in 2018

== Sources and external links ==
- GCatholic ^{[self-published]}
- Grkokatolički vikarijat u Bosni i Hercegovini
