= Gabrijel Smičiklas =

- Eparch of Križevci
- Church: Greek Catholic Church of Croatia and Serbia
- Diocese: Eparchy of Križevci
- In office: 23 June 1834 – 14 March 1856
- Predecessor: Konstantin Stanić
- Successor: Đuro Smičiklas

Orders
- Ordination: 11 June 1808
- Consecration: 21 September 1834 by Samuil Vulcan

Personal details
- Born: 24 March 1783 Sošice, Zagreb County, Kingdom of Croatia, Habsburg Empire
- Died: 14 March 1856 (aged 72) Križevci, Križevci County, Kingdom of Croatia, Austrian Empire

Gabrijel Smičiklas (24 March 1783 – 14 March 1856) was a Croatian Greek Catholic hierarch. He was the bishop from 1834 to 1856 of the Eastern Catholic Eparchy of Križevci.

Born in Sošice, Habsburg monarchy (present day – Croatia) in 1783, he was ordained a priest on 11 June 1808 for the Eparchy of Križevci. Fr. Smičiklas was the Rector of the Greek Catholic Seminary in Zagreb from 1809 to 1810.

He was confirmed as the Bishop by the Holy See on 23 June 1834. He was consecrated to the Episcopate on 21 September 1834. The principal consecrator was Bishop Samuil Vulcan.

He died in Križevci on 14 March 1856.

Catholic Church titles
Preceded by Konstantin Stanić	Eastern Catholic Bishop of Križevci; 1834–1856	Succeeded by Đuro Smičiklas
