= Donji Oštrc =

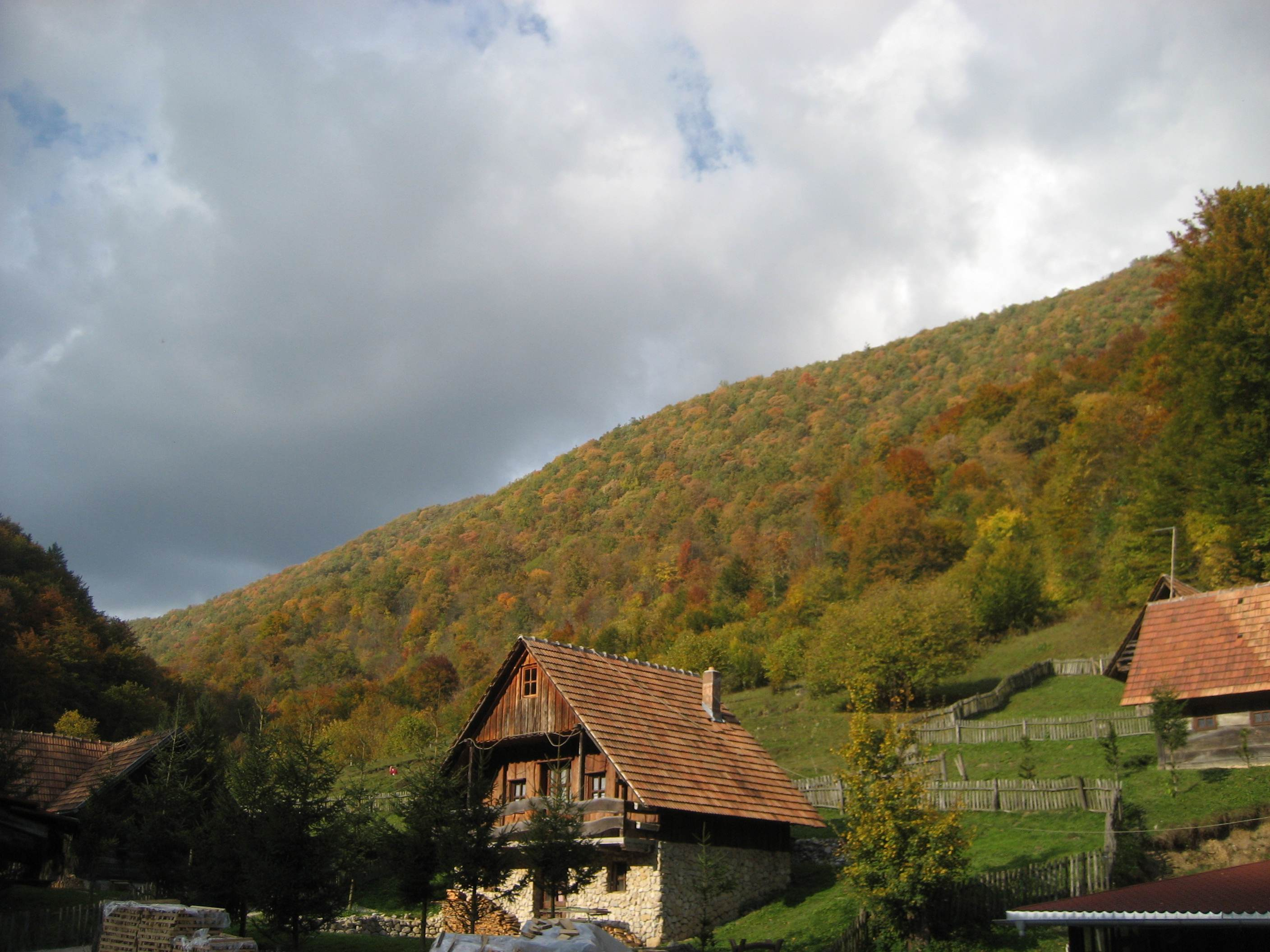

- Location within Croatia
- Coordinates: 45°42′00″N 15°25′58.59″E

Area
  - Total: 5.4 km^{2} (2.1 sq mi)

Population (2021)
  - Total: 43
  - Density: 8.0/km^{2} (21/sq mi)
- Time zone: Central European Time
- Postal code: 10455
- Area code: (+385) 10

Donji Oštrc, together with Tupčina and Gornji Oštrc form the settlement (naselje) of Oštrc, and belong to the municipality of Žumberak.

In 1835, Donji Oštrc had 16 houses and 201 inhabitants.

Donji Oštrc also includes the hamlets: Baroni, Bučari, Donji Mahovlići, Garapići, Gorniki, Krajačići, Radelji, Rajakovići and Stanišići.

Donji Oštrc had 72 inhabitants according to the census in 2011.

Donji Oštrc belongs to the parish of Oštrc, which was founded in 1827.
