= Slavomir Miklovš =

The Right Reverend Slavomir Miklovš
- Eparch of Križevci
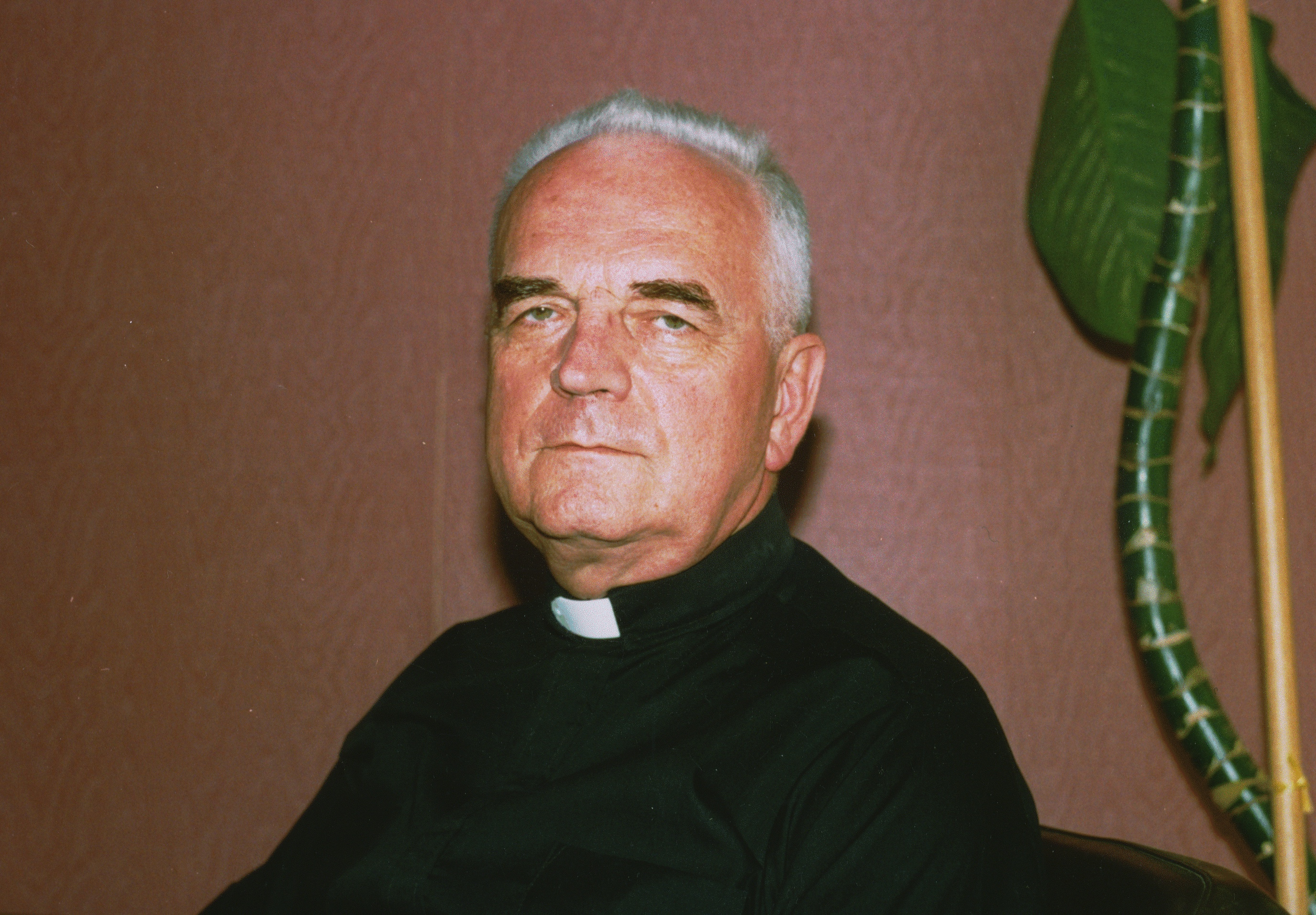
- Church: Byzantine Church of Croatia, Serbia and Montenegro
- Diocese: Eparchy of Križevci
- Appointed: 22 January 1983
- Term ended: 25 May 2009
- Predecessor: Gabrijel Bukatko (up to 1964)
- Successor: Nikola Kekić

Orders
- Ordination: 7 June 1964 (Priest)
- Consecration: March 25, 1983 (Bishop) by Miroslav Marusyn

Personal details
- Born: 16 May 1934 Đurđevo, Kingdom of Yugoslavia
- Died: 21 July 2011 (aged 77) Novi Sad, Serbia

Slavomir Miklovš (16 May 1934 – 21 July 2011) was the Byzantine Catholic bishop of Eparchy of Križevci (in former Yugoslavia, present day Croatia). He was an ethnic Rusyn.

Ordained to the priesthood in 1964, he became bishop of the eparchy in 1983 retiring in 2009.
