= Tupčina =

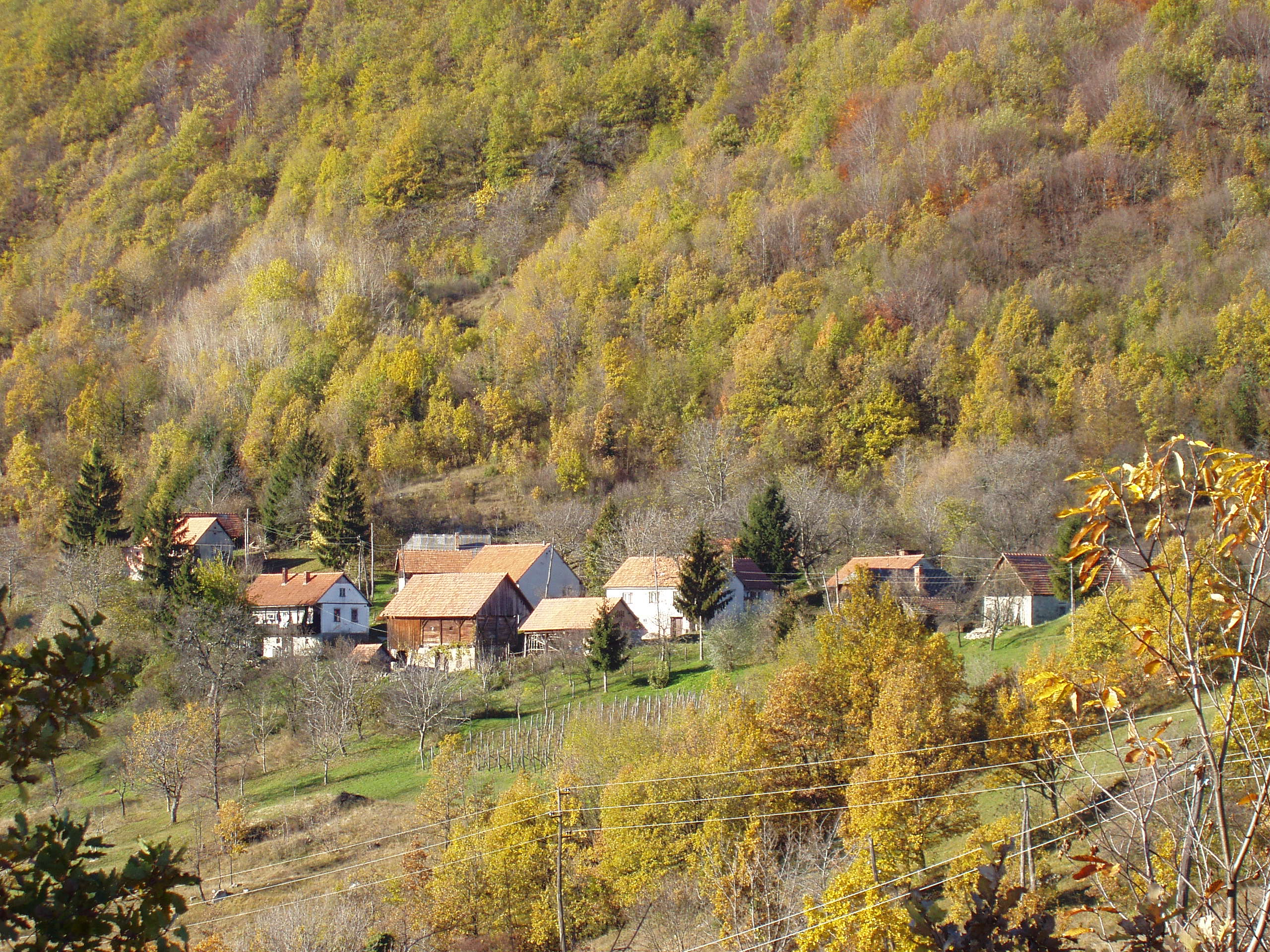

- Location within Croatia
- Coordinates: 45°42′54″N 15°26′20″E

Area
  - Total: 3.8 km^{2} (1.5 sq mi)

Population (2021)
  - Total: 32
  - Density: 8.4/km^{2} (22/sq mi)
- Time zone: Central European Time
- Postal code: 10455
- Area code: (+385) 10

Tupčina, together with Donji Oštrc and Gornji Oštrc form the settlement (naselje) of Oštrc, and belong to the municipality of Žumberak.

Tupčina also includes the hamlets: Duralije i Jankovići.

Tupčina had 49 inhabitants according to the census in 2011.

Tupčina belongs to the parish of Oštrc, which was founded in 1827.
