= Plavci, Croatia =

Settlement in Zagreb County, Croatia

Plavci
- Settlement
- Interactive map of Plavci
- Location of Plavci in Croatia
- Coordinates: 45°42′04″N 15°27′47″E
- Country: Croatia
- County: Zagreb County
- Municipality: Žumberak

Area
  - Total: 1.1 km^{2} (0.42 sq mi)

Population (2021)
  - Total: 0
  - Density: 0.0/km^{2} (0.0/sq mi)
- Time zone: UTC+1 (CET)
  - Summer (DST): UTC+2 (CEST)
- Postal code: 10454 Krašić
- Area code: +385 (0)1

Plavci is a settlement in the Municipality of Žumberak in Croatia. In 2021, its population was 0.

== Demographics ==
Plavci: Population trends 1857–2021
v

population	48	58	64	65	68	76	68	85	67	64	56	45	25	10	16	5
	1857	1869	1880	1890	1900	1910	1921	1931	1948	1953	1961	1971	1981	1991	2001	2011	2021

Sources: Croatian Bureau of Statistics publications
