= Kamanje =

- Village
- Interactive map of Kamanje
- Location within Croatia
- Coordinates: 45°38′N 15°24′E
- Country: Croatia
- County: Karlovac County

Area
  - Village: 14.6 km^{2} (5.6 sq mi)
  - Urban: 1.6 km^{2} (0.62 sq mi)

Population (2021)
  - Village: 827
  - Density: 56.6/km^{2} (147/sq mi)
  - Urban: 366
  - Urban density: 230/km^{2} (590/sq mi)
- Time zone: UTC+1 (CET)
  - Summer (DST): UTC+2 (CEST)
- Website: kamanje.hr

Kamanje is a village and a municipality in Croatia.

In the 2011 census, the total population was 891, in the following settlements:

- Brlog Ozaljski, population 89
- Kamanje, population 366
- Mali Vrh Kamanjski, population 67
- Orljakovo, population 188
- Preseka Ozaljska, population 12
- Reštovo, population 104
- Veliki Vrh Kamanjski, population 65
