= Stari Grad Žumberački =

- Location within Croatia
- Coordinates: 45°45′39″N 15°24′45″E
- Country: Croatia
- County: Zagreb County
- Municipality: Žumberak

Area
  - Total: 4.5 km^{2} (1.7 sq mi)

Population (2021)
  - Total: 4
  - Density: 0.89/km^{2} (2.3/sq mi)
- Time zone: UTC+1 (CET)
  - Summer (DST): UTC+2 (CEST)

Stari Grad Žumberački is a naselje (settlement) in the municipality of Žumberak, Zagreb County, Croatia. According to the 2011 census, it has 2 inhabitants.
