= Dionisije Njaradi =

Greek Catholic bishop

- Bishop of Križevci
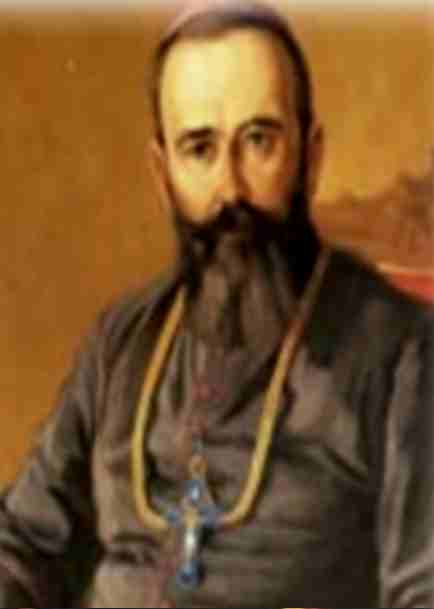
- Church: Greek Catholic Church of Croatia and Serbia
- Diocese: Eparchy of Križevci
- In office: 22 April 1920 – 14 April 1940
- Predecessor: Julije Drohobeczky
- Successor: Janko Šimrak
- Previous posts: Apostolic Administrator of Prešov (1922-1927); Titular Bishop of Abila Lysaniae (1914-1920); Apostolic Administrator of Križevci (1914-1920)

Orders
- Ordination: 1 January 1899 by Julije Drohobeczky
- Consecration: 9 January 1915 by Lazar Mladenov

Personal details
- Born: 10 August 1874 Ruski Krstur, Kingdom of Hungary, Transleithania, Austria-Hungary
- Died: 14 April 1940 (aged 65) Mrzlo Polje, Banovina of Croatia, Kingdom of Yugoslavia

Dionisije Njaradi (10 October 1874 – 14 April 1940) was a Greek Catholic hierarch of Rusyn origin. He was auxiliary bishop (as titular Bishop of Abila Lysaniae) and Apostolic Administrator from 1914 to 1920 (until 1917 sede plena) and bishop from 1920 to 1940 of the Greek Catholic Eparchy of Križevci and Apostolic Administrator of Slovak Catholic Eparchy of Prešov from 1922 to 1927.

== Biography ==
Born in Ruski Krstur in 1874, at the time in Austria-Hungary, today in Serbia, he was ordained a priest on 1 January 1899 for the Eparchy of Križevci. Fr. Njaradi was the Rector of the Greek Catholic Seminary in Zagreb from 1902 to 1914.

He was appointed the Titular Bishop of Abila Lysaniae and Apostolic Administrator by the Holy See on 5 December 1914. He was consecrated to the Episcopate on 9 January 1915. The principal consecrator was Bishop Lazar Mladenov, and the principal co-consecrators were Archbishop Pierre Kojunian and Bishop Nematallah Carame.

He died in Mrzlo Polje on 14 April 1940 while making a pastoral visit in the Žumberak mountains.

Catholic Church titles
Preceded by Julije Drohobeczky	Eastern Catholic Bishop of Križevci; 1914–1940 (until 1920 as apostolic administrator)	Succeeded by Janko Šimrak
Preceded by Štefan Novák as bishop	Apostolic Administrator of the Slovak Catholic Eparchy of Prešov; 1922–1927	Succeeded by Pavel Peter Gojdič
