= Žumberak, Zagreb County =

Žumberak
- Municipality
- Municipality of Žumberak
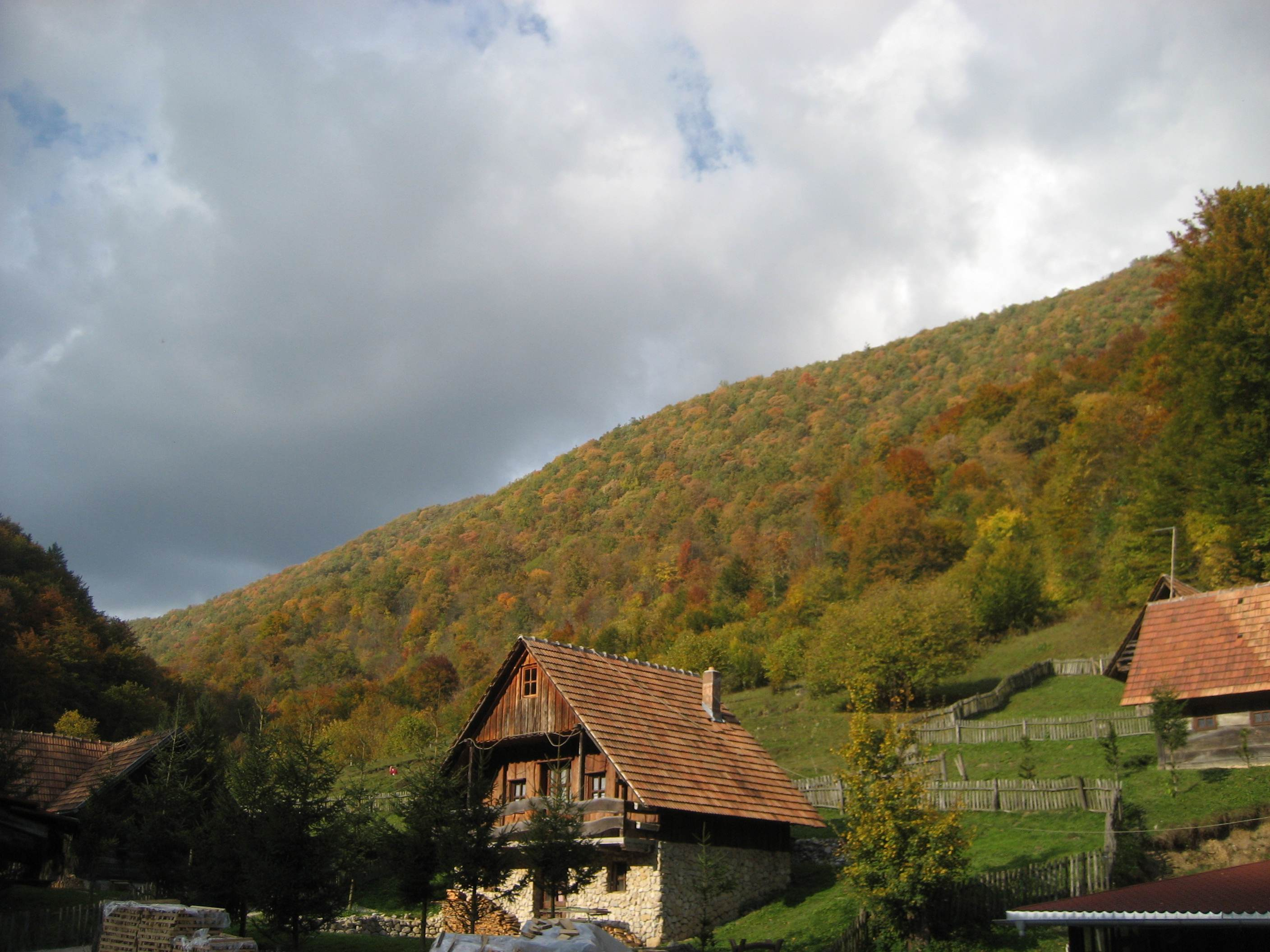
- Interactive map of Žumberak
- Location of Žumberak in Croatia
- Coordinates: 45°42′0″N 15°27′36″E
- Country: Croatia
- Region: Central Croatia
- County: Zagreb County

Area
  - Municipality: 110.1 km^{2} (42.5 sq mi)
  - Urban: 3.9 km^{2} (1.5 sq mi)

Population (2021)
  - Municipality: 609
  - Density: 5.53/km^{2} (14.3/sq mi)
  - Urban: 9
  - Urban density: 2.3/km^{2} (6.0/sq mi)
- Time zone: UTC+1 (Central European Time)
- Vehicle registration: ZG
- Website: zumberak.hr

Žumberak is a village and a municipality in Croatia in the Zagreb County. According to the 2011 census, there are 883 inhabitants, 98% of which are Croats. Žumberak municipality covers an area of 110 km^{2} (42 sq mi). The municipal centre is located in the village of Kostanjevac.

Žumberak together with the Samobor Mountains form a nature park. Žumberak is a karst area with beech and chestnut forests. Many residents of Žumberak at the end of the 19th century immigrated to Slovenia, Austria and Germany because of grapevine phylloxera. Nowadays, rural tourism, wine production and viticulture have developed in Žumberak.

== Population ==
In 2021, the municipality had 609 residents in the following 35 settlements:

- Cernik, population 5
- Donji Oštrc, population 43
- Drašći Vrh, population 17
- Glušinja, population 14
- Gornji Oštrc, population 36
- Grgetići, population 0
- Grič, population 7
- Hartje, population 27
- Javor, population 7
- Jezernice, population 0
- Jurkovo Selo, population 54
- Kalje, population 13
- Kordići Žumberački, population 4
- Kostanjevac, population 100
- Kupčina Žumberačka, population 22
- Markušići, population 2
- Mrzlo Polje Žumberačko, population 23
- Petričko Selo, population 13
- Plavci, population 0
- Radinovo Brdo, population 4
- Reštovo Žumberačko, population 13
- Sopote, population 6
- Sošice, population 54
- Stari Grad Žumberački, population 4
- Stupe, population 19
- Tomaševci, population 6
- Tupčina, population 32
- Veliki Vrh, population 6
- Visoće, population 15
- Višći Vrh, population 4
- Vlašić Brdo, population 0
- Vukovo Brdo, population 9
- Žamarija, population 14
- Željezno Žumberačko, population 27
- Žumberak, population 9
Žumberak: Population trends 1857–2021
v

population	4017	5107	5623	6179	5975	5686	5537	5768	5274	5157	4461	3533	2438	1899	1185	883	609
	1857	1869	1880	1890	1900	1910	1921	1931	1948	1953	1961	1971	1981	1991	2001	2011	2021

Sources: Croatian Bureau of Statistics publications
