= Sošice =

Settlement in the Municipality of Žumberak, Zagreb County, Croatia

- Location within Croatia
- Coordinates: 45°45′03″N 15°22′51″E
- Country: Croatia
- County: Zagreb County
- Municipality: Žumberak

Area
  - Total: 14.6 km^{2} (5.6 sq mi)

Population (2021)
  - Total: 54
  - Density: 3.7/km^{2} (9.6/sq mi)
- Time zone: UTC+1 (CET)
  - Summer (DST): UTC+2 (CEST)

Sošice is a settlement in the municipality of Žumberak, Zagreb County, Croatia. According to the 2011 census, it has 77 inhabitants.

The name of the settlement was mentioned in written documents for the first time in Bernard's gift book, when the monastery in Kostanjevica na Krki acquired part of the land in Sošice in 1249.

The town was an important settlement of the Greek Catholic Church in Croatia. The local parish was formed c. 1746. The parish home was burnt down along with the local school in 1942 by Yugoslav Partisans.

Jazovka, a pit which contained a mass grave from World War II, is located near the settlement.

In 2022, a visitor center opened in Sošice for the nature park Žumberak–Samobor Hills, (Croatian: Žumberak – Samoborsko gorje). It is the third center built in this park and was co-financed by the European Union and granted in parts by the Environmental Protection and Energy Efficiency Fund of the Republic of Croatia.

== Location ==
It is set in the Žumberak Mountains, in northwestern Croatia. It is home to the highest peak of the mountain range, Sveta Gera, at a height of 1,178 metres (3,865 ft). The town is southerly neighboring of the Mihovo settlement in Slovenia.

== Climate ==
Since records began in 1996, the highest temperature recorded at the local weather station was 34.9 °C (94.8 °F), on 4 August 2017. The coldest temperature was −20.5 °C (−4.9 °F), on 25 January 2006.

== Notable people ==
- Branko Ve Poljanski
