= Greek Catholic Eparchy of Križevci =

Greek Catholic eparchy in the Balkans

Eparchy of Križevci Dioecesis Crisiensis Križevačka eparhija

Greek Catholic
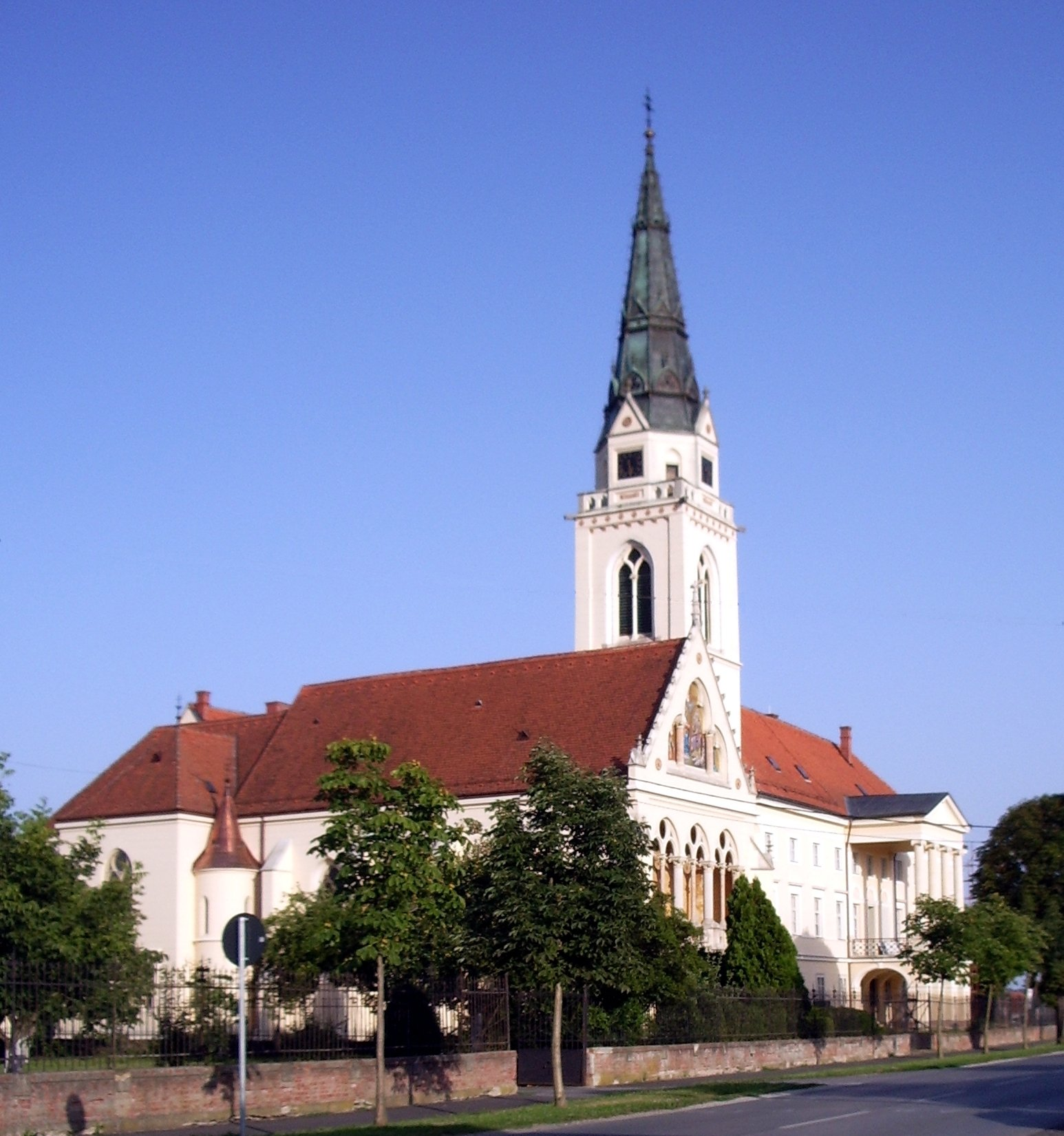
- Cathedral of the Holy Trinity in Križevci, Croatia

Location
- Country: Croatia; Slovenia; Bosnia and Herzegovina
- Ecclesiastical province: Zagreb
- Metropolitan: Archdiocese of Zagreb

Statistics
- Population: (as of 2013); 21,270
- Parishes: 44

Information
- Denomination: Catholic Church
- Sui iuris church: Greek Catholic Church in Croatia and Serbia
- Rite: Byzantine Rite
- Established: 17 June 1777
- Cathedral: Cathedral of the Holy Trinity in Križevci, Croatia
- Co-cathedral: Co-Cathedral of Sts. Cyril and Methodius, Zagreb
- Secular priests: 28

Current leadership
- Pope: Leo XIV
- Eparch: Milan Stipić
- Metropolitan Archbishop: Dražen Kutleša
- Bishops emeritus: Nikola Kekić

The Eparchy of Križevci is a Greek Catholic Church in Croatia and Serbia eparchy of the Catholic Church in Croatia, Slovenia, and Bosnia and Herzegovina. Its current eparch is Milan Stipić. The cathedra is in the Cathedral of the Holy Trinity, in the episcopal see of Križevci, Croatia.

It mostly gathers its faithful among ethnic Croats in central and eastern Croatia, and among the Ukrainians and Rusyns in eastern Slavonia, with a small Serb minority. The liturgy used by the Eparchy is the Slavonic form of the Byzantine Rite, using the Old Church Slavonic language and the Cyrillic alphabet.

== History ==
=== Historical background ===
The Ottoman wars in Europe caused a number of Christian refugees, Orthodox Serbs, to migrate to the Military Frontier of the Habsburg monarchy (in south-central Croatia and in most of Slavonia) during the 16th and 17th centuries. In particular after the Ottoman defeat in Battle of Sisak of 1593, the Habsburg tried to established an ecclesiastical jurisdiction in full communion with Rome and separated from the Serbian Orthodox Church. After negotiations, it was decided to establish a particular Byzantine Rite jurisdiction in the form of an apostolic vicariate based in the monastery of Marča (located near Ivanić Grad).

The basis for the creation of Apostolic Vicariate of Marča was formally enabled by Pope Paul V on 21 November 1611 with the decree Divinae Majestatis arbitrio, and the administration of the Vicariate was given to eparchs (bishops) who bore the title Episcopus Platæensis (from Plataea, the titular see they were assigned to), while the Habsburg government called this see Episcopatus Svidnicensis or Episcopatus Maciensum (Eparchy of Marča). After the death in 1630 of the first eparch (bishop), Simeon Vratanja, and in 1628 of the Latin Bishop of Zagreb, Petar Dimitrović, the eparchy came into conflict with the Latins and in 1671 bishop Pavle Zorčić accepted for himself and his successors the position of vicar-general of the Latin bishops of Zagreb.

On 17 November 1735, the supporters of the Serbian Orthodox Church occupied by force of arms the monastery of Marča and two years later, on 17 June 1737, set fire to it. The monastery was restored to the Byzantine Rite Catholics in 1753.

=== Erection of the Eparchy of Križevci ===
To support the pastoral action for the Greek Rite population, the Habsburg Empress Maria Theresa realized that it was necessary to grant independence to the eparchy, and she obtained from Pope Pius VI its separation from the Latin Diocese of Zagreb, in a similar way as occurred in 1771 for the Eparchy of Mukacheve from the Diocese of Eger. Accordingly, on 17 June 1777, Pope Pius VI erected the Greek Rite Eparchy of Križevci which superseded the Eparchy of Marča. Vasilije Božičković, who played a prominent role in the erection of the eparchy, was chosen as first eparch,

Many Orthodox Serbs opposed the new eparchy especially in Žumberak, particularly the metropolitan of Karlovci, Arsenije III Čarnojević. However, the Serb soldiers of the Žumberak regiment of the Military Frontier joined the Eparchy of Križevci.

Križevci, the location of the see, is a town northeast of Zagreb. The new bishop was a suffragan initially of the Archdiocese of Esztergom, and later of Zagreb, after this became a metropolitan see in 1852.

=== Expansion ===
In 1914, the Ruthenian Catholic Apostolic Administration of Bosnia-Hercegovina was created from the Eparchy of Križevci, but in 1925, it was merged back into it, when the eparchy was expanded to include all Greek Catholics in Yugoslavia. Owing to this expansion and to population movements over time, Križevci includes Catholics of varied national heritage including:

- Croats and Serbs from Žumberak
- Rusyns in Slavonia (Croatia), Vojvodina (Serbia) and northern Bosnia who had emigrated from Carpatho-Ukraine and Slovakia
- Ukrainians who emigrated from Galicia (now in Ukraine) around 1900
- ethnic Serbs
- Macedonian converts through missionary activity in the 19th century
- a few Romanians in the Serbian Banat

=== Croatian War of Independence (1991–1995) ===
During the Croatian War of Independence (1991–1995), the Eparchy of Križevci was severely affected by military operations and ethnic displacement, particularly in Eastern Slavonia, where a significant portion of its Croatian, Rusyn, and Ukrainian faithful resided. Following the Battle of Vukovar and the establishment of the self-proclaimed Republic of Serbian Krajina (RSK) in late 1991, Greek Catholic parishes in occupied areas—including Vukovar, Petrovci, and Mikluševci—suffered widespread population expulsion, looting, and damage to church infrastructure alongside Roman Catholic institutions.

While Serbian nationalist wartime rhetoric frequently targeted the Holy See as a political adversary, the persecution of Greek Catholics in RSK-held territories was primarily driven by broader campaigns of ethnic cleansing against all non-Serb populations rather than specific theological distinctions. Furthermore, the establishment of international borders between Croatia and the Federal Republic of Yugoslavia severed traditional pastoral and community ties between the eparchy's parishes in Slavonia and the larger Rusyn-Ukrainian Greek Catholic population in Vojvodina, prompting the subsequent administrative reorganization of the eparchy by the Holy See in the early 2000s.

=== Since the break-up of Yugoslavia ===
Until 2001, the Eparchy of Križevci had full jurisdiction over all Eastern Catholics of the Byzantine Rite throughout the entire territory of former Yugoslavia, including all of its successor states: Croatia, Slovenia, Bosnia-Herzegovina, Serbia, Montenegro and North Macedonia. In January 2001, a separate Greek Catholic Apostolic Eparchy of Macedonia was formed for Eastern Catholics of the Byzantine Rite in Macedonia. It was fully separated from the Eparchy of Križevci and directly subjected to the Holy See.

In 2003, a new apostolic exarchate was created for Eastern Catholics of the Byzantine Rite in Serbia and Montenegro, called the Apostolic Exarchate of Serbia and Montenegro. Its first exarch Đura Džudžar was appointed in 2003, with residence in Ruski Krstur. This exarchate remained in association with the Eparchy of Križevci. After those changes, the jurisdiction of Eparchy of Križevci was reduced to Croatia, Slovenia, and Bosnia-Herzegovina.

In 2013, all Catholics of Byzantine Rite in Montenegro were entrusted to the local Latin Bishops, so the jurisdiction of the Apostolic Exarchate of Serbia and Montenegro was reduced to just Serbia, now the Eparchy of Saint Nicholas of Ruski Krstur. Since then, the Eparchy of Križevci and the Eparchy of Saint Nicholas of Ruski Krstur together constitute the Greek Catholic Church of Croatia and Serbia as a sui iuris Eastern Catholic Church of the Byzantine Rite, in full communion with the rest of the Catholic Church.

== Extension ==
The Eparchy reported for the year 2010 a total of 21,509 faithful in the eparchy proper (including Croatia, Slovenia, and Bosnia and Herzegovina) and 22,369 in the Apostolic Exarchate for Serbia and Montenegro. In comparison, the most recently published census results for the Republic of Croatia, those of 2001, report only 6,219 Croatians defining themselves specifically as Greek Catholics.

A historical trend of a sharp decline in numbers, particularly in the general vicinity of Zumberak, is explained by a number of factors including emigration, particularly to the United States (including Cleveland, Chicago and Pittsburgh), and rural depopulation, particularly in the period following the second world war.

== Diaspora ==
The first Greek Catholic priest from Croatia came to the United States of America in 1902, whose work among Byzantine-Rite Croatians in Cleveland was encouraged by the bishop of Križevci. Another Croatian priest came to Allegheny, Pennsylvania, in 1894. Križevci is one of the four Eastern European eparchies that are the roots of the Eastern Rite Catholic Churches in the United States.

== Vicariates ==
The eparchy is made up of four vicariates:

- Žumberak vicariate
- Bosnian vicariate
- Slavonia-Srijem vicariate
- Dalmatian vicariate, in Croatia

== Bishops ==
The list of the eparchs (bishops) of the Greek Catholic Eparchy of Križevci is:

#	Incumbent	From	Until
1	Vasilije Božičković, O.S.B.M. (1719–1785)	15 July 1777	9 May 1785
2	Jozafat Bastašić, O.S.B.M. (1740–1793)	30 March 1789	28 August 1793
3	Silvestar Bubanović, O.S.B.M. (1754–1810)	8 November 1795	14 June 1810
4	Konstantin Stanić (1757–1830)	10 September 1815	31 July 1830
5	Gabrijel Smičiklas (1783–1856)	8 September 1834	14 March 1856
6	Đuro Smičiklas (1815–1881)	21 December 1857	20 April 1881
7	Ilija Hranilović (1850–1889)	15 March 1883	20 March 1889
8	Julije Drohobeczky (1853–1934)	17 December 1891	18 May 1917
9	Dionisije Njaradi (1874–1940) Apostolic Administrator, 1917–1920 Bishop, 1920–1940	18 May 1917	14 April 1940
10	Janko Šimrak (1883–1946) Apostolic Administrator, 1941–1942 Bishop, 1942–1946	16 August 1941	9 August 1946
11	Gabrijel Bukatko (1913–1981) Apostolic Administrator, 1952–1960 Bishop, 1960–1961 Apostolic Administrator, 1961–1981	23 February 1952	19 October 1981
-	Joakim Segedi (1904–2004) Auxiliary Bishop	24 February 1963	27 October 1984
12	Slavomir Miklovš (1934–2011)	22 January 1983	25 May 2009
13	Nikola Kekić (b. 1943)	25 May 2009	18 March 2019
-	Milan Stipić (b. 1978) Apostolic Administrator, 2019–2020 Bishop, 2020–present	18 March 2019	Present

== See also ==
- Eastern Christianity
- Catholic Church in Croatia
- Ruthenian Greek Catholic Church
