= Catholicisation =

Conversion into Catholicism, and the expanding Catholic influence

Catholicisation (American English: Catholicization) refers mainly to the conversion of adherents of other religions to Catholicism, and the system of expanding Catholic influence in politics. Catholicisation was a policy of the Holy See through the Papal States, the Holy Roman Empire and the Habsburg monarchy. Sometimes this process is referred to as re-Catholicisation, although in many cases Catholicised people had never been Catholics before.

The Eastern Catholic Churches are a communion in the Catholic Church of Eastern Christian rites such as the Byzantine, Alexandrian, Armenian, East Syrian and West Syrian Rites, as opposed to the Latin Church.

== Catholic doctrine ==
Christian denominations in Polish–Lithuanian Commonwealth before (1573) and after (1750) the campaign of Catholicisation

The Congregation for the Evangelization of Peoples (Latin: Congregatio pro Gentium Evangelizatione), formerly Sacred Congregation for the Propagation of the Faith (Latin: Sacra Congregatio de Propaganda Fide) is the congregation of the Roman Curia responsible for missionary work and related activities.

In 1439 in Florence, the Declaration of Union was adopted, according to which "the Roman Church firmly believes that nobody, who does not belong to the Catholic Church, not only unbelievers, but Judeans (Jews), nor heretics, nor schismatics, cannot enter the kingdom of heaven, but all will go to the eternal fire, which is saved for devils and their angels, if they not before death turn to that church". The Council of Trent (1545–63) had the mission to gain, apart from "stray" Protestants, also the numerous schismatics from the Catholic Church in southeastern Europe.

== Catholicisation and Uniatism ==
=== Polish–Lithuanian Commonwealth ===
During the period from the 16th to the 18th century, in eastern regions of Polish–Lithuanian Commonwealth and Kingdom of Hungary several successive campaigns of Catholicisation were undertaken in order to convert local Eastern Orthodox Christians into Catholicism.

=== Transylvania ===
The Transylvanian Armenians, refugees from Moldavia and Poland, were Catholicized in the 1685–1715 period. The vicar Bertalan Szebelébi tried to convert these Armenians in c. 1680, but failed. In 1682–84, Uniatization missions were conducted among the Transylvanian Armenians. After the death of local Armenian Apostolic bishop Minas in 1686, the local Catholic church under Oxendio spread lies that Minas had converted to Catholicism. In 1689, the Transylvanian Armenians signed a religious union.

Following the Habsburg takeover of Transylvania in the 1680s, bishop of Gyulafehérvár, Atanasie Anghel, entered into full communion with the See of Rome by the Act of Union of 1698, that was formalized by a synod of bishops on 4 September 1700.

=== Serbs ===
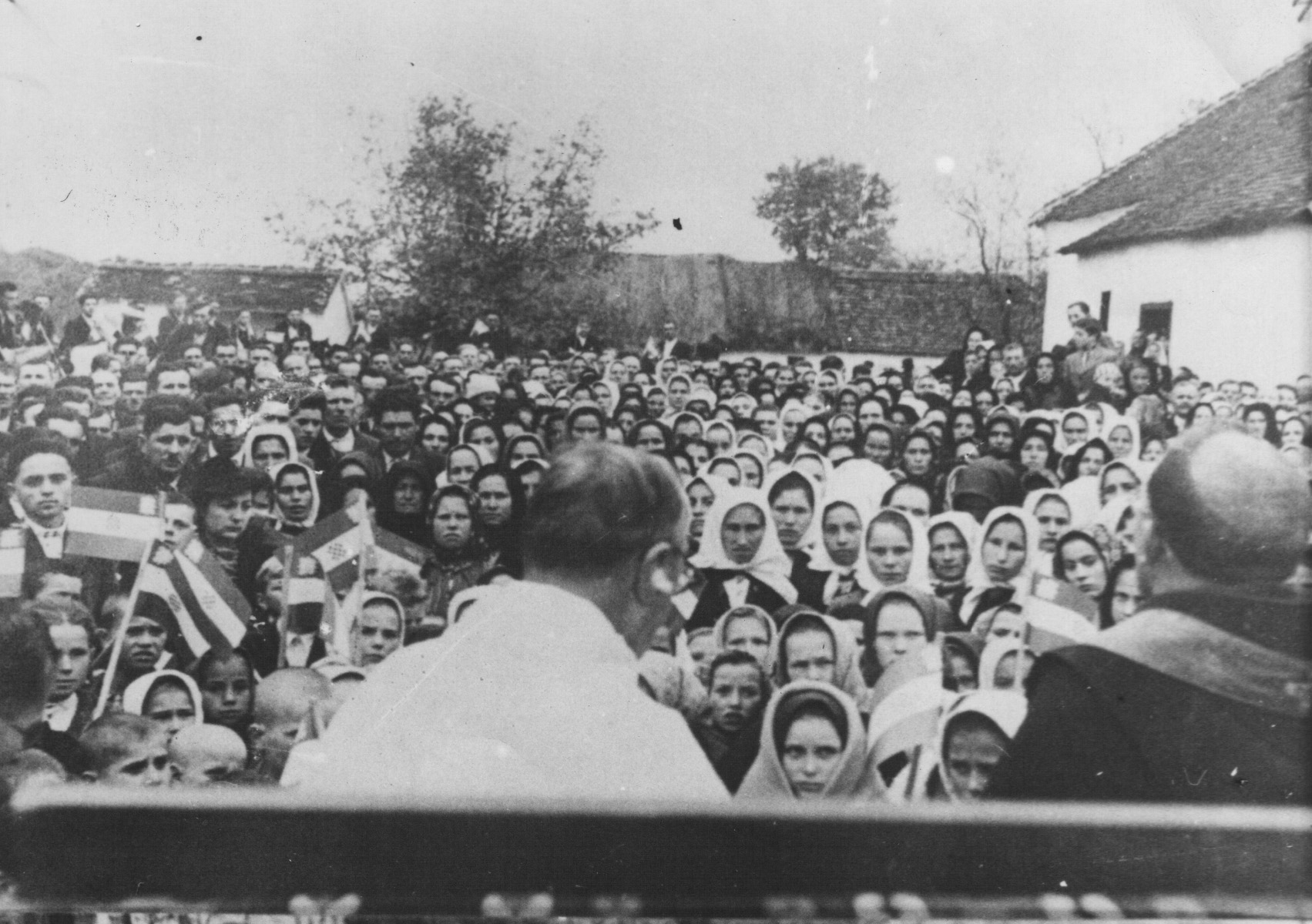
Catholic priest Sidonije Šolc converting Serbian Orthodox Christians to Catholicism, in Bosanska Dubica (August 1941)

Since the 15th century Bosnian Franciscans were allowed to propagate their religious doctrine and work on gaining adherents. It was decreed on 23 August 1418 by Pope Martin V that the Franciscan friars preach Catholicism among the "recently converted" in Serbia, Bosnia, Wallachia, and Bulgaria (Latin: fidelibus noviter conversis ... fidem catholicam praedicando). The Council of Trent (1545–1563) had the mission to gain both Protestants, and Orthodox Christians in southeastern Europe. The Serbian Orthodox Church became targeted, the strongest pressure during the term of Pope Clement VIII (1592–1605), who used the difficult position of the Orthodox in the Ottoman Empire and conditioned the Serbian Patriarch to Uniatize in return for support against the Turks.

Serbian Orthodox Christians and Bogomils were targeted for Catholicisation by clergy from Republic of Ragusa.

Since the many migrations of Serbs into the Habsburg monarchy beginning in the 16th century, there were efforts to Catholicise the community. The Orthodox Eparchy of Marča became the Catholic Eparchy of Križevci after waves of Uniatisation in the 17th and 18th centuries. Notable individuals active in the Catholicisation of Serbs in the 17th century include Martin Dobrović, Benedikt Vinković, Petar Petretić, Rafael Levaković and Ivan Paskvali. The Catholic bishops Vinković and Petretić wrote numerous inaccurate texts meant to incite hatred against Serbs and Orthodox Christians, some of which included advice on how to Catholicise the Serbs.

During World War II, the Axis Ustashe led the campaign of Genocide of Serbs in the Independent State of Croatia. An estimated 300,000 were converted to Catholicism, most temporarily.

== See also ==
- Inquisition
- Proselytism
- Counter-Reformation
- Persecution of Eastern Orthodox Christians

== Sources ==
- Kornél, Nagy (2011). "The Catholicization of Transylvanian Armenians (1685-1715): Integrative or Disintegrative Model?". Integrating Minorities: Traditional Communities and Modernization. Cluj-Napoca: Editura ISPMN. pp. 33–56. ISBN 9786069274491.
- Litwin, Henryk (1987). "Catholicization among the Ruthenian Nobility and Assimilation Processes' in the Ukraine during the Years 1569-1648" (PDF). Acta Poloniae Historica. 55: 57–83. ISSN 0001-6829.
- Vuković, Slobodan V. (2004). "Uloga Vatikana u razbijanju Jugoslavije". Sociološki Pregled. 38 (3): 423–443. doi:10.5937/socpreg0403423V.
- Fermendžin, Eusebius, ed. (1892). Monumenta spectantia historiam Slavorum meridionalium: Edidit Academia Scienciarum et Artium Slavorum Meridionalium: Acta Bosnae. Vol. XXIII.
- Zach, Krista (1979). "Die bosnische Franziskanermission des 17. Jahrhunderts im süd-östlichen Niederungarn: Aspekte ethnisch - konfessioneller Schichtung in der Siedlungsgeschichte Niederungarn" (PDF). Studia Hungarica. 13.
