= Maksim Predojević =

- Bishop of Vretanija
- Church: Latin Church (nominally); Serbian Patriarchate of Peć
- Installed: 1630
- Term ended: 1642
- Predecessor: Simeon Vretanja
- Successor: Gavrilo Predojević
- Previous post: archimandrite of Marča

Orders
- Consecration: Pajsije of Janjevo
- Rank: vladika

Personal details
- Born: Maksim Predojević or Mojsilović; Unknown
- Died: 1642 Marča
- Denomination: Eastern Orthodox Christian
- Residence: Marča

Maksim Predojević (Serbian: Максим Предојевић) was a Serbian Orthodox bishop of the Eparchy of Vretanija (Marča) in the Military Frontier in the period of 1630 to 1642, during a time when Marča was nominally Uniate (Eastern Catholic) but in reality still Eastern Orthodox.

== Early life ==
In the Chronicle of Marča and Lepavina (Летопис манастира Марче и Лепавине) his surname is given as Mojsilović (Мојсиловић). Predojević was part of the Frontiersmen delegation sent to Emperor Ferdinand II in Regensburg in 1630 to discuss and expand the "Vlach privileges" which became the Statuta Valachorum. A copy of the statute, which guaranteed the right of Orthodox Frontiersmen, was held at the Marča monastery in the following decades.

== Bishop ==
His predecessor Simeon Vretanja had initially served as an Orthodox bishop subordinated the Serbian Patriarchate of Peć (1609) but became Uniate in 1611 through his relations with the Catholic leadership in the Varaždin generalate and personal relation to Catholic clergymen Martin Dubravić (a convert) and bishop of Zagreb Petar Domitrović. Uniatism was not supported by the Orthodox people, while it threatened the privileges held by the Orthodox frontiersmen who were freed of paying taxes that the majority of Catholics did. Bishop Simeon became seriously ill and placed Maksim Predojević, the archimandrite of the Marča Monastery, as administrator. Predojević became bishop of Marča in 1630. An Imperial decree given to Predojević named him the bishop of Vretanija and asked him to receive confirmation from Pope Urban VIII. The Congregation of Propaganda was unaware that Predojević was bishop until 1634, having worked previously to put Ruthenian monk Nikifor Losowsky at the seat, with the Nuncio finally informing all involved that this would be impossible to implement as Predojević had administrated the bishopric for several years and had already been confirmed by Imperial decree. Still, the Congregation of Propaganda deemed the Imperial decree invalid and decided to not confirm Predojević as bishop in a meeting on 10 January 1634, which did however not change anything on the ground. The Austrian court would risk a rebellion in the Varaždin generalate by replacing Predojević.

Predojević had bad relations with the Zagreb Diocese, but still confirmed Simeon's 1628 charter to Marča serfs about Papal subordination in 1636. While Simeon Vretanja personally was loyal to Uniatism and the Pope, the nominal Papal subjugation and strategical maneuvering can be clearly seen in the tenure of Predojević. Predojević was obliged to get confirmation from Rome regarding his title and confirm Catholic faith to the Nuncio in Graz. Instead, Predojević returned to the Military Frontier and then went to the Serbian Patriarchate where he was confirmed as vladika. Predojević was a noted opponent to Uniatism and a protector of the rights and privileges of Orthodox Frontiersmen.

A serious conflict between the Orthodox population and the Catholic Zagreb Diocese started with the appointment of Benedikt Vinković as bishop of Zagreb in 1637. Vinković wrote letters and complaints to the Congregation of Propaganda and the Austrian court accusing Predojević to be a "schismatic and heretic" (Orthodox) and asked for his seat to be replaced with a Catholic. Vinković's activities were aimed against Predojević when he refused to support the conversion of the population of his bishopric. Franciscan prelate Rafael Levaković (Vinković's candidate for Marča) claimed that there were 1,200 Orthodox families in the Varaždin generalate upon which Predojević in 1641 claimed that there were 11,000 Orthodox families in the Zagreb Diocese.

Predojević died in 1642 and was succeeded by his relative Gavrilo Predojević, who also opposed Uniatism.

== Annotations ==
1. His title was "bishop of Vretanija"; Episcopatus Vretaniensis as per decree by Ferdinand II, dated 8 May 1630, ad titulum Vretaniensem as per letter by Ferdinand II dated August 1630.

== Sources ==
- Ćorović, Vladimir (1997). Istorija srpskog naroda. Glas srpski. ISBN 978-86-7119-101-2.
- Jovičin, Miroslav (2025). "Срби и Римска курија I". Novi Sad: Културни центар Новог Сада.
- Kašić, Dušan Lj. (1967). Srbi i pravoslavlje u Slavoniji i sjevernoj Hrvatskoj. Savez udruženja pravosl. sveštenstva SR Hrvatske.
- Kašić, Dušan Lj. (1988). Srpska naselja i crkve u sjevernoj Hrvatskoj i Slavoniji. Savez udruženja pravoslavnih sveštenika SR Hrvatske.
- Miltojević, Milutin (2014). "Српска историографија о унијаћењу Срба у седамнаестом веку". Историографија и савремено друштво. Филозофски факултет Ниш: 220–230.
- Popović, Dušan J., ed. (1934). Гласник Историског друштва у Новом Саду. Vol. 7. Историско друштво НР Србије.
- Žutić, Nikola (1997). Rimokatolička crkva i hrvatstvo: od ilirske ideje do velikohrvatske realizacije 1453-1941. Institut za savremenu istoriju.
