= Gavrilo Avramović =

Serbian Metropolitan

- Metropolitan of Dabar and Bosnia
- Church: Serbian Orthodox Church
- Metropolis: Dabar and Bosnia
- Installed: fl. 1578
- Predecessor: Josif
- Successor: Petronije

Orders
- Rank: metropolitan

Personal details
- Born: Avramović; 1518 Ottoman Empire
- Died: c. 1600 Habsburg monarchy
- Denomination: Eastern Orthodox

Gavrilo Avramović (Serbian: Гаврило Аврамовић; 1518–1600) was a Serbian Orthodox bishop who served as the metropolitan of Dabar and Bosnia in the period of 1578–88. He was the exarch of the Patriarch of Peć for Dalmatia and was responsible for organizing the Serbian Orthodox Church in the region. Around 1588 he had left Bosnia and Dalmatia, and with the monks of the Rmanj monastery, where he lived, and many people, he moved to the Habsburg Croatian Military Frontier. Metropolitan Avramović is credited with founding monasteries in Croatia.

Gavrilo moved the seat of the Metropolitanate of Bosnia from the Banja Monastery to the Rmanj Monastery in western Bosnia near the tripoint with Lika and Dalmatia. He is the first known holder of the title "Exarch of the Patriarch of Peć in Dalmatia". In 1578 he appointed the hegumen of Krka Monastery his assistant in the administration of churches in Dalmatia.

Metropolitan Gavrilo left Bosnia with 70 monks from Rmanj. The Marča Monastery in the Habsburg Croatian Military Frontier was founded in the period of 1578–88 or in c. 1580 by Metropolitan Gavrilo Avramović with Imperial decree. A church dedicated to Holy Archangel Michael and Gabriel was built on the ruins of a church destroyed by the Turks. The church became a centre of the Orthodox population in the Varaždin generalate and became a target for Uniatism. In c. 1600 Avramović gave over the administration of Marča to Simeon Vratanja as archimandrite; Vratanja supported Uniatism.

It is believed that the Lepavina Monastery was founded by monks from Herzegovina led by Jevrem Vukodabić in 1555; another view is that it was founded by Gavrilo Avramović and Visarion Šerbanić from Bosnia as a wooden church before 1598 which became a monastery with the influx of monks from Ottoman territories. There was also a claim that he founded the Gomirje Monastery in the period of 1578–88.

He was styled "Metropolitan of Bosnia and Klis and Lika".

== See also ==
- Eparchy of Dalmatia

Eastern Orthodox Church titles
Preceded by Josif	Metropolitan of Dabar-Bosnia; 1578–1588	Succeeded by Petronije

== Sources ==
- Krasić, Vladimir (1889). "Manastir Lepavina: Nastavak". Летопис Матице српске. У Српској народној задружној штампарији: 10.
- Д. Витковић, Дабро-босански митрополит Гаврило Аврамовић (1912).
