= Greek Catholic Seminary in Zagreb =

Oldest Greek Catholic seminary in the world

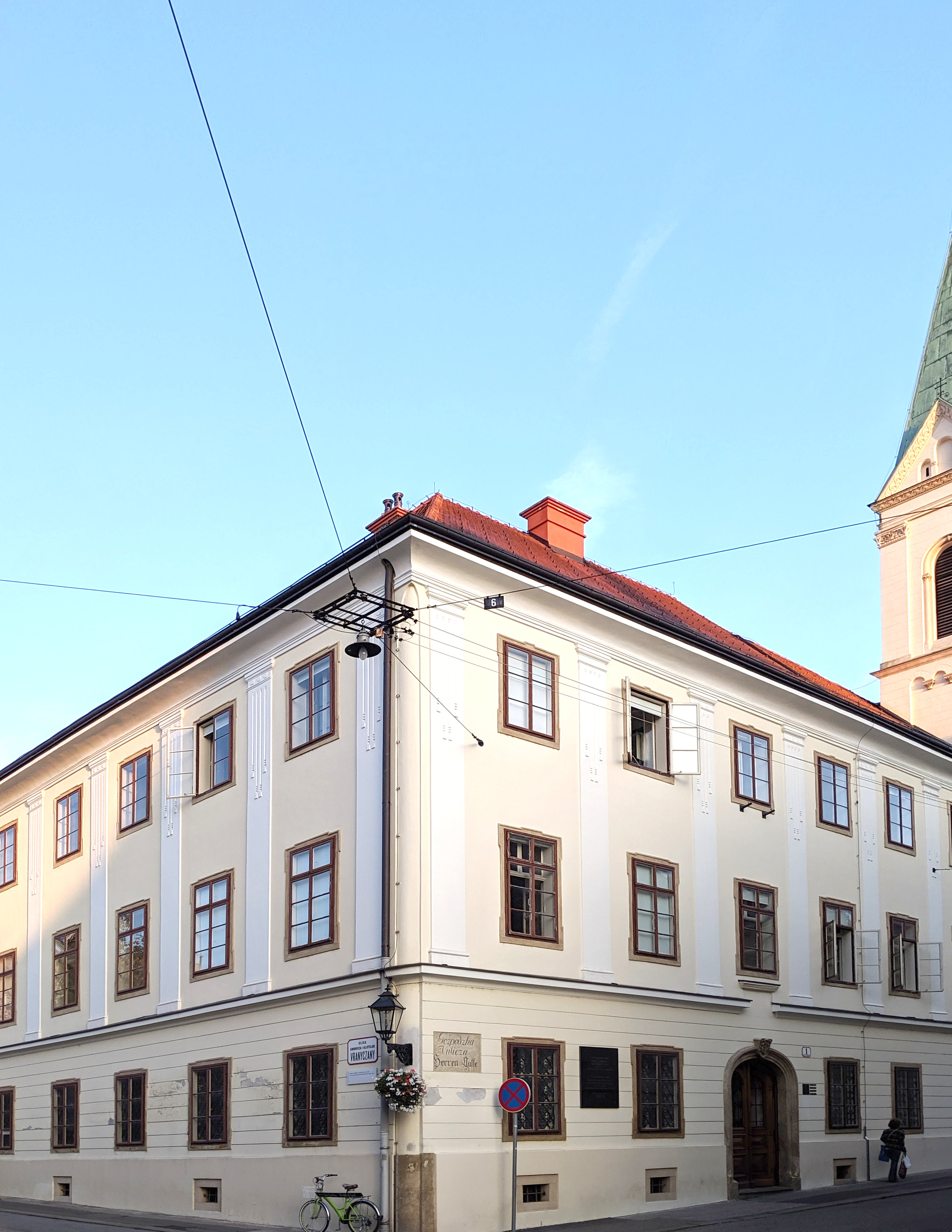
- Type: Private graduate institution
- Established: 1681 (345 years ago)
- Affiliations: Greek Catholic Eparchy of Križevci
- Rector: Daniel Vranešić
- Location: Zagreb, Croatia
- Website: Official website

The Greek Catholic Seminary in Zagreb (Croatian: Grkokatoličko sjemenište u Zagrebu) is the oldest Greek Catholic seminary in the world outside Rome. This Major seminary has been in continuous operation since 1681. It is the major education institution of the Greek Catholic church in Croatia, Bosnia and Herzegovina and Slovenia. Historically it played an important role in the Illyrian movement.

== History ==
To improve education among the Uskoks in Croatia and Slavonia, bishop Pavao Zorčić established 1680 this seminary in the center of Zagreb. The small house was ready for operation one year later and was housing the rector with assistants and among a dozen students visiting the College or the University of the Jesuits in Zagreb. The seminary had a byzantine Chapel, study rooms and a Refectory.

Over the years the seminary grew and the building was expanded. After a destruction by fire bishop Vasilije Božičković rebuilt the seminary and it became the first two floor building in Zagreb. He added a church dedicated to Basil of Caesarea which became eventually the Greek Catholic parish church in Zagreb. Later, after the huge destruction of the 1880 Zagreb earthquake a new splendid seminary and parish church dedicated to Cyril and Methodius was erected by bishop Ilija Hranilović and executed by the renowned architect Hermann Bollé.

The rectors of the seminary and the students played a distinctive role in the Greek Catholic Church in Croatia, but not less in Croatian society, being the major intellectuals and defenders of the unity of the Eastern Orthodox Church with the Catholic Church in Croatia.

== Rectors ==
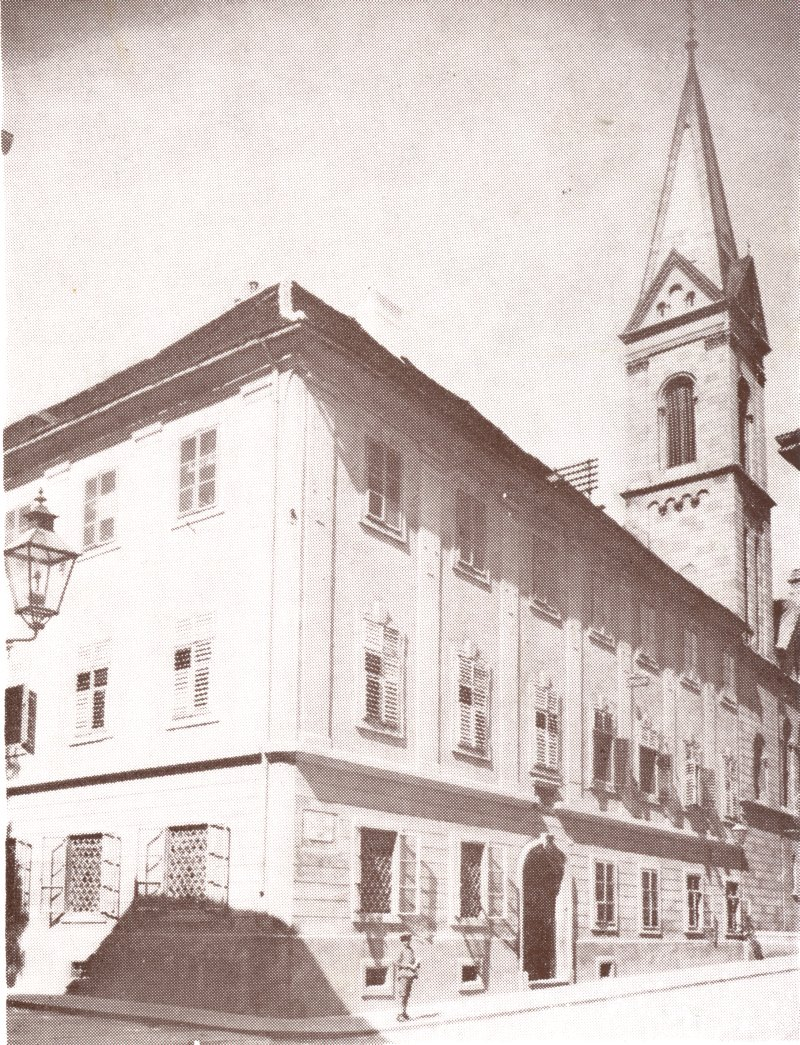
Greek Catholic seminary in the 1920s

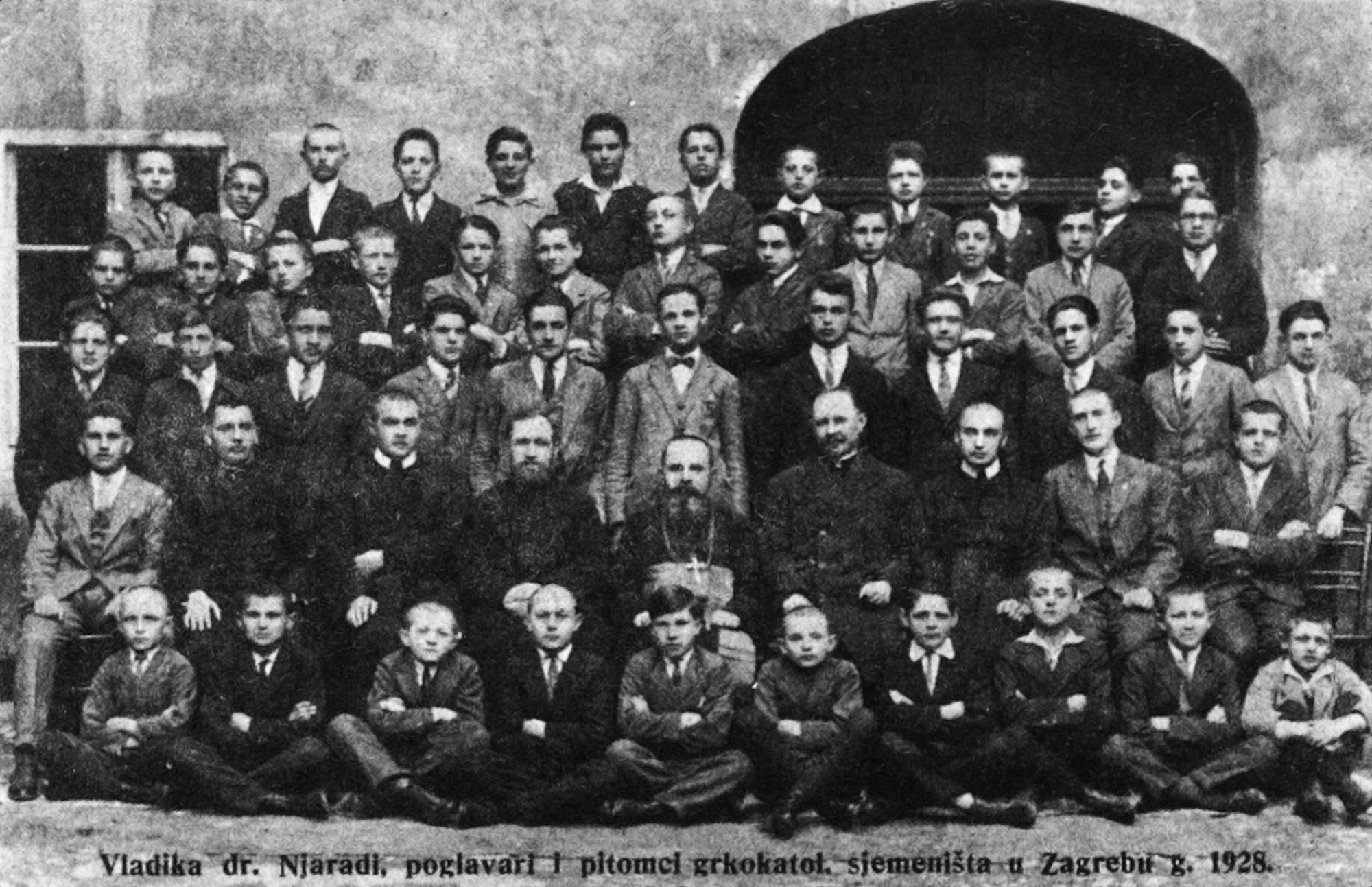
Bishop Dionizije Njaradi, rector Višošević (left of bishop) and alumni

1. Đuro Germiniković (1688-?)
2. P. Teodor Strahinić OSBM (ca. 1700)
3. vl. Grgur Jugović (1702-?)
4. Franjo Novak (1710-?)
5. vl. Teofil Pašić (1738–1739)
6. Simeon Bulić (1742-?)
7. Ignacije Latković (1772–1776)
8. Atanazije Gvozdanović (1776–1779)
9. vl. Silvestar Bubanović (1780–1781)
10. Janko Rajaković (1781–1782)
11. vl. Konstantin Stanić (1782–1785, 1807–1809)
12. Tomo Čučić (Layperson, 1794–1796)
13. Antun Tumara (1800–1807)
14. vl. Gabre Smičiklas (1809–1810)
15. Konstantin Poturičić (1810– 1812)
16. Simeon Čučić (1812–1821)
17. Bazilije Božičković (1830–1831)
18. Nikola Malić (1831–1837)
19. Janko Goleš (1837–1846)
20. Janko Predović (1846–1849)
21. dr. Petar Stić (1849–1851)
22. Pavao Bratelj (1851–1860)
23. Bazilije Poturičić (1860–1861)
24. Marko Stanić (1861–1866)
25. Tomo Vidović (1866–1871)
26. prof. Gabro Smičiklas (1871–1877)
27. ak. prof. dr. Tadija Smičiklas (Layperson, 1877–1882)
28. Vladimir Laboš (1882–1885)
29. prof. dr. Anton Franki (1885–1891)
30. Andrija Segedi (1891–1897)
31. dr. Dane Šajatović (1897–1902)
32. vl. dr. Dionizije Njaradi (1902–1914)
33. dr. Tomo Severović (1914–1924)
34. dr. Ivan Đuro Višošević OSBM (1924–1956)
35. Ivan Krstitelj Pavković (1956–1990)
36. vl. Nikola Kekić (1990–2019)
37. dr. Robert Rapljenović (2019–2020)
38. Daniel Vranešić (2020-)

== Sources ==
- Šimrak, Janko (1931). Spomenica o 250-godišnjici grkokatoličkog sjemeništa u Zagrebu (1681. – 1931.) [Memorandum 250 Years of the Greek Catholic Seminary in Zagreb (1681-1931)] (in Croatian). Zagreb: Tiskara Narodne prosvjete.
- Jubilarni šematizam Križevačke eparhije [Anniversary Schematismus of the Eparchy of Križevci] (in Croatian). Zagreb: Eparchy of Križevci. 1962., pages 12-13.
- Pavković, Ivan Krstitelj (1981). Iz galerije rektora grkokatoličkog sjemeništa u Zagrebu, Žumberački krijes [From the gallery of the rectors of the Greek Catholic Seminary in Zagreb] (in Croatian). Zagreb., pages 78-79.
