= Robert Rapljenović =

German archpriest, church historian and catholic Hesychastic theologian

The Very Reverend Archpriest-Stavrophor Robert Rapljenović
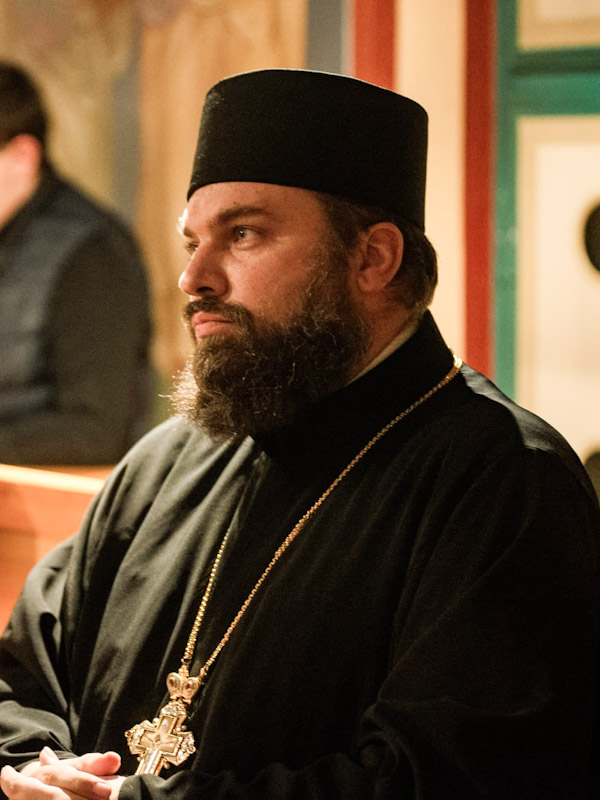
- Archpr. Robert Rapljenovic (2022)
- Other posts: Docent, Oriental College of Eichstätt, Eichstätt, Germany

Orders
- Ordination: May 24, 2010 by vl. Nikola Kekić

Personal details
- Born: Robert John; August 8, 1979 Frankfurt, Germany
- Denomination: Greek Catholic Church
- Education: Sankt Georgen Graduate School of Philosophy and Theology and Catholic University of Eichstätt-Ingolstadt

Robert Rapljenović (August 8, 1979) is a German catholic Archpriest, church historian and Eastern Theologian. He is lead tutor at the Oriental College of Eichstätt, visiting docent at the Institutum Studiorum Philosophici et Theologici Societatis Jesu (FTI) in Zagreb and was rector of the Greek Catholic Seminary in Zagreb.

== Biography ==
Robert Rapljenović studied computer science at the Technical University of Darmstadt, worked for Fraunhofer Society and finished philosophy studies and church history at Graduate School of Philosophy and Theology Sankt Georgen in Frankfurt/Main. He finished theology studies at Institutum Studiorum Philosophici et Theologici Societatis Jesu (FTI) in Zagreb, which is affiliated with Pontifical Gregorian University in Rome. He was ordained a priest in 2010 by Nikola Kekić of the Eparchy of Križevci in Croatia, worked with the parishes Sosice and Kast in Žumberak. He held several positions: Radio editor for Radio Maria, was a member of the Family Council and the Council for Seminaries and Priestly and Religious Vocations of the Episcopal Conference of Croatia.

He was rector of the Greek Catholic Seminary in Zagreb and visiting docent at the Institutum Studiorum Philosophici et Theologici Societatis Jesu (FTI) in Zagreb. He is elevated to the rank of archpriest 2021 by bishop Milan Stipić of Križevci.

He is lead tutor of scientific education (Ltd. Repetitor), at the Oriental College of Eichstätt in Eichstätt (Germany) and works as an Eastern Theologian in the fields of Church history (catholic-orthodox relations, church-state/church-nation Dilemma), Ecumenism and Eastern Orthodox Spirituality.

== Work ==
=== Habsburg monarchy, Eastern churches and Slavic people ===
In a large scale transnational study Rapljenović presented an overview to the hierarchical suppression of nations in the Habsburg monarchy. He presented the role of denomination in National identity by examples of Away from Rome! movements at the end of the 19th century, a critical moment in the development of National consciousness. His work is inter alia a continuation of the studies of Andreas Moritsch.

=== Eparchy of Križevci ===
Rapljenović is the only contemporary church historian who had the opportunity to study the church history of the Eparchy of Križevci in the major Vatican archives (Vatican Apostolic Archive, Archive of the Secretariat of State (Holy See)) and the non public Archive of the Eparchy of Križevci. Beside his mentioned study covering also the reign of bishop Julije Drohobeczky he published a directory for Church historians covering the Clergy of the Eparchy of Križevci.

=== Hesychastic spirituality ===
As an Eastern catholic theologian Rapljenović he is a rare representative of Hesychastic theology and Noetic prayer. Following Ioánnis S. Romanídes, Hierotheos Vlachos and especially Naum Ilievski he represents a synthesis of Orthodox psychology but strongly limited to the field of prayer and spiritual development.

== Selected bibliography ==
- Mount Athos Spirituality: The Jesus Prayer, Orthodox Psychotherapy and Hesychastic Anthropology, Independently Published 2024, ISBN 979-8327883819.
- Prayer of the Heart: Byzantine Catholic Spirituality for the 21st Century, Independently Published 2026, ISBN 979-8199884372.
- «The hearts of man were made great enough to contain God himself» : Hesychastische Anthropologie aus der Perspektive Orthodoxer Psychotherapie, u: Sebastian Kießig / Marco Kühnlein (ur.): Anthropologie und Spiritualität für das 21. Jahrhundert (Eichstätter Studien 80), Regensburg : Freidrich Pustet 2019, 117–137.
- Maxima Scandala in Ecclesia Catholica: Los-von-Rom-Bewegungen des Fin de Siècle im Spannungsfeld zwischen Nationalismus, Fortschrittsglauben und Identitätssuche (Eastern Church Identities), Paderborn : Ferdinand Schöningh 2020.
- Vzťah cirkvi a štátu a jeho vplyv na gréckokatolícke reformy: Krátky prehĺad niektorých úspechov reforiem v dejinách Gréckokatolíckej cirkvi v Chorvátsku, u: Daniel Černý (ur.): Zamoščská synoda, Bratislava-Rim 2021.
- Index presbyterorum ordinis et Necrologium eparchiae Crisiensis: Popis svećenika i Necrologium Križevačke eparhije, Eichstätt 2021/2022.
