= Methodius Terleckyj =

- Born: Методій Терлецький; 16th century Duchy of Belz
- Died: 1649
- Other name: Metodije Terlecki

Methodius Terleckyj or Metodije Terlecki (died 1649) was the main supervisor of the Sacred Congregation for the Propagation of the Faith for publishing of the Slavic language liturgical books. Terleckyj was Ruthenian, i.e. Ukrainian from Belz Voivodeship and bishop of the Bishopric of Chelm (Orthodox bishopric which entered communion with the see of Rome).

== Early life ==
Before 1626 Terlecki became an Eastern Catholic priest of the Byzantine Rite. In 1626 he studied logic in Vienna and in 1627-28 he studied theology. In 1628 Josyf Veliamyn Rutsky appointed Terlecki as bishop of the Bishopric of Chelm and expected his return from Vienna to Chelm after he first travel to Rome to submit a report about Rusyn Greek-Catholic church.

== Mission to convert Orthodox Serbs ==
Terlecki participated in efforts to convert Orthodox Serbs in Croatia and Slavonia. Terlecki interested Josyf Veliamyn Rutsky in conversion of Orthodox Serbs of Slavonia and Croatia into Eastern Catholicism. Before he accepted appointment for this mission, Terlecki insisted that Rutsky should first give his approval. That is why Pope wrote to Rutsky and asked his permission for Terleckyj's mission, emphasizing that souls of 60,000 people would be saved in this mission.

In period between 1628 and 1644 Terlecki travelled many times to Slavonia and Croatia, actively working on the religious conversion of its Orthodox population under jurisdiction of the Bishopric of Marča. His activities were supported by Toma Hren, bishop of the Bishopric of Ljubljana. In 1628 Propaganda Fide sent him to visit Serbs living in the region of Žumberak. Upon his return Terlecki wrote a report which pleased the emperor and the Propaganda fide.

Based on the explicit instructions given directly by the Pope, Terlecki collaborated with Rafael Levaković.

== Sources ==
- Badurina, Antun (2001). Iskoni bê slovo: zbornik radova o glagoljici i glagoljašima Zadarskog kraja i Crkvi svetog Ivana Krstitelja. Provincijalat franjevaca trećoredaca. ISBN 978-953-97691-3-8.
- Nazor, Anica (2008). Knjiga o hrvatskoj glagoljici: "Ja slovo znajući govorim--". Erasmus. ISBN 978-953-6132-83-6.
- Matica (1880). Vienac. Matica hrvatska.
- Književnost (1996). Književnost.
- Ћоровић, Владимир; Петровић, Драгољуб С (2006). Историја Срба. Дом и школа. ISBN 9788683751303.
- Glasnik (1912). Bogoslovski Glasnik.
- umetnosti, Srpska akademija nauka i (1950). Posebna izdanja.
- Kudelić, Zlatko (2007). Marčanska biskupija: Habsburgovci, pravoslavlje i crkvena unija u Hrvatsko-slavonskoj vojnoj krajini (1611. - 1755). Hrvatski Inst. za Povijest. ISBN 978-953-6324-62-0.
- Bassett, William W. (1 January 1967). The determination of rite, an historical and jurical study. Gregorian Biblical BookShop. ISBN 978-88-7652-129-4.
- Basiliani (1975). Analecta OSBM.: Zapisky CHSVV.. Opera. Opera. PP. Basiliani.
