= Teofil Pašić =

Teofil Pašić, O.S.B.M. (c.1700 – 1759) was a Ruthenian and Croatian Greek Catholic hierarch. He was the titular bishop of Plataea and Vicar Apostolic of Marča from 1738 to 1746.

Before his nomination as bishop, Fr. Pašić was the chaplain in Potsdam for the Greek-Catholic soldiers in the Army of Frederick William I of Prussia and rector of the Greek Catholic Seminary in Zagreb from 1738 to 1739.

He was appointed as the Bishop by the Holy See on 28 August 1738. He was consecrated to the Episcopate on 20 January 1739. The principal consecrator was Archbishop Basilio Matranga. He was removed from office of the Vicar Apostolic and exiled in the Basilian monastery.

He died in the St. Onuphrius Basilian Monastery in Lviv (in present day – Ukraine) on 1759.

Catholic Church titles
Preceded by Silvestar Ivanović	Vicar Apostolic of Marča; 1738–1746	Succeeded by Gabrijel Palković
