= Krka monastery =

Serbian Orthodox monastery near Kistanje, Croatia

Coordinates: 43°57′42″N 15°59′26″E

Krka Monastery
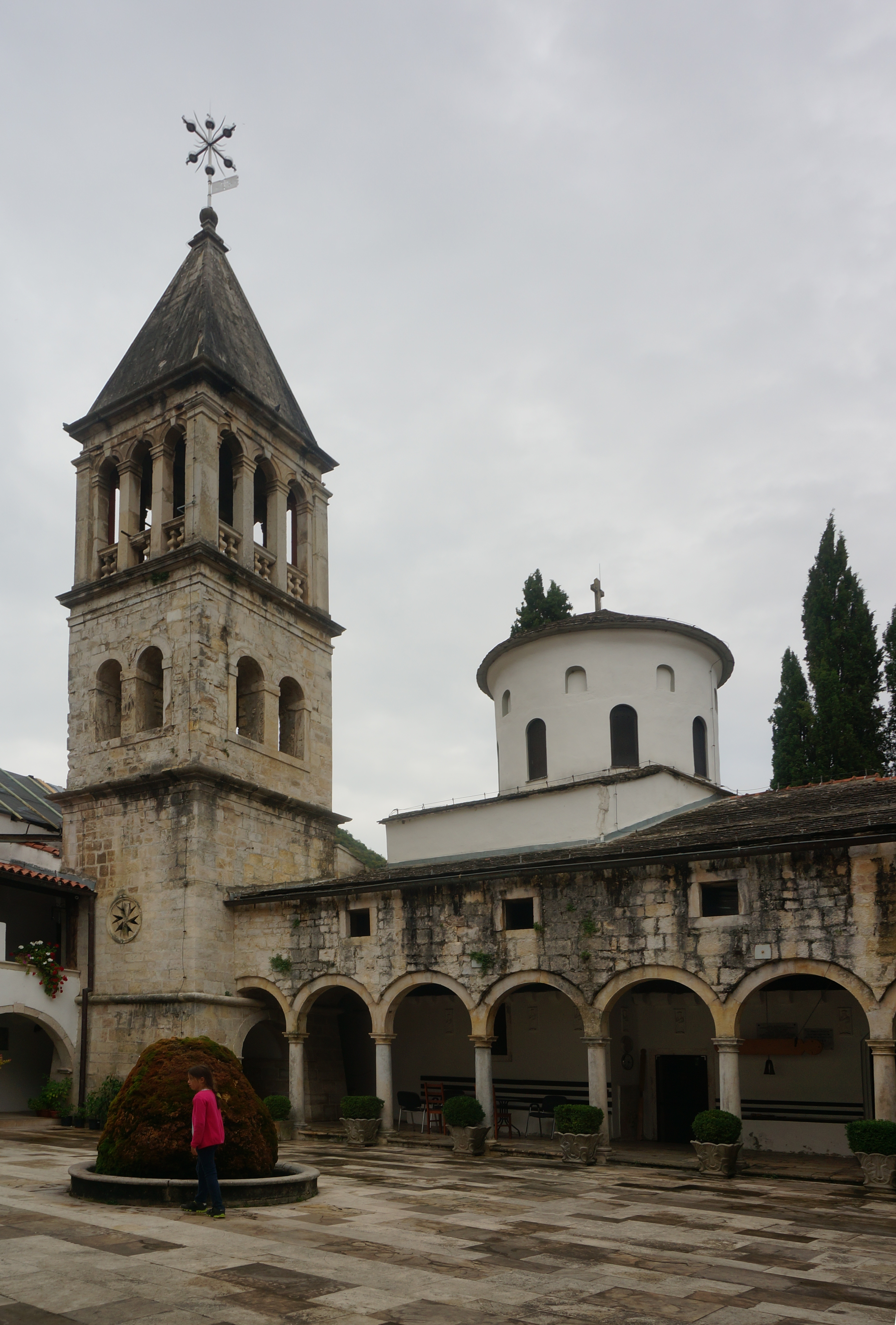
- Krka Monastery
- Interactive map of Krka Monastery

Monastery information
- Order: Serbian Orthodox Church
- Established: c. 1577

Site
- Location: near Kistanje, Croatia
- Public access: Yes

The Krka Monastery (Serbian Cyrillic: Манастир Крка, Serbian: Manastir Krka; Croatian: Samostan Krka) is a 16th-century Serbian Orthodox monastery dedicated to the Archangel Michael, located near the river Krka, 3 kilometres (1.9 mi) east of Kistanje, in central Dalmatia, Croatia. It is the best-known monastery of the Serbian Orthodox Church in Croatia, and it is officially protected as part of the Krka National Park. It was established around 1577 or later on the grounds of a previous Gothic-Romanesque style Catholic church.

== History ==
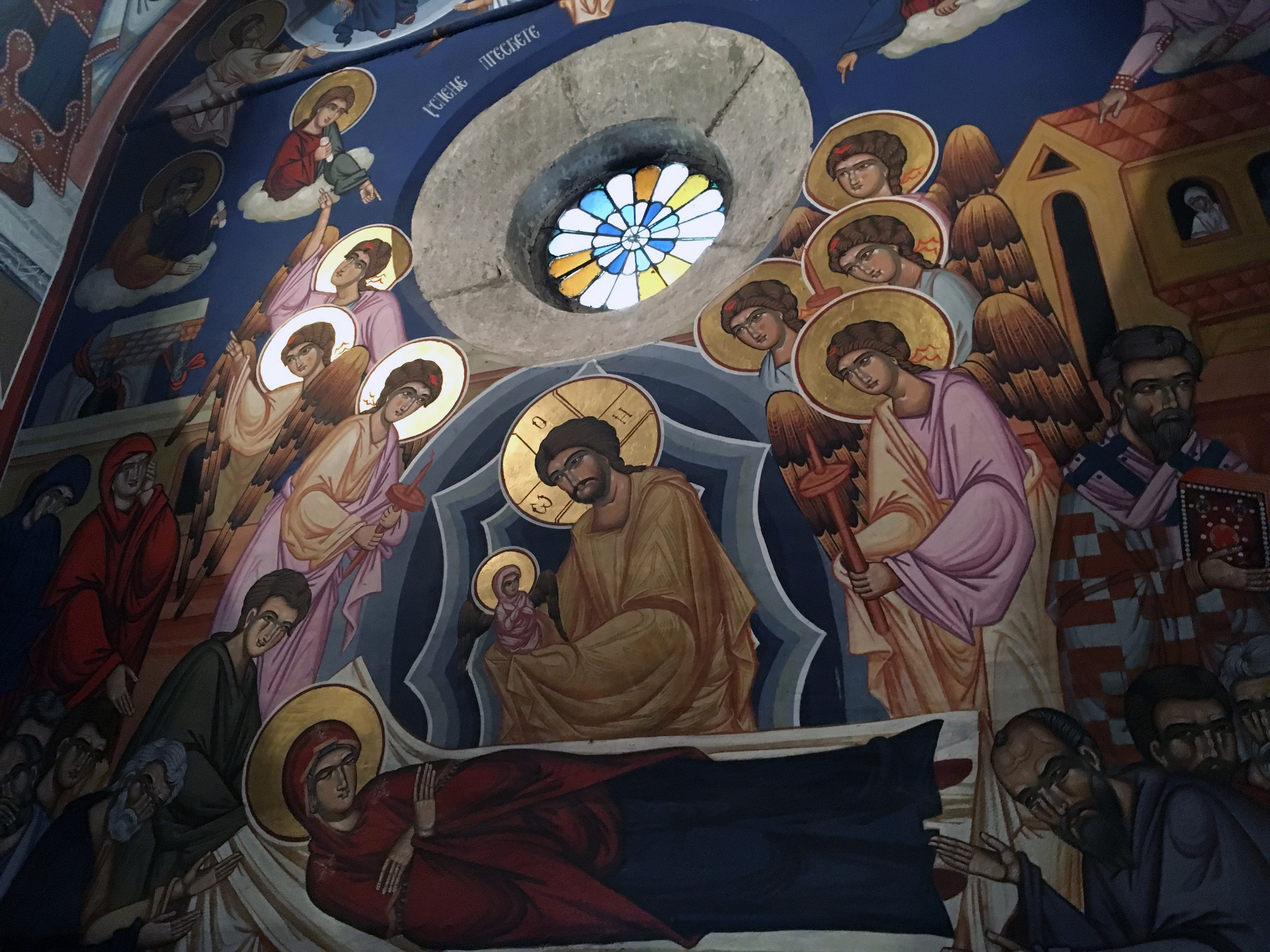
A fresco of the monastery

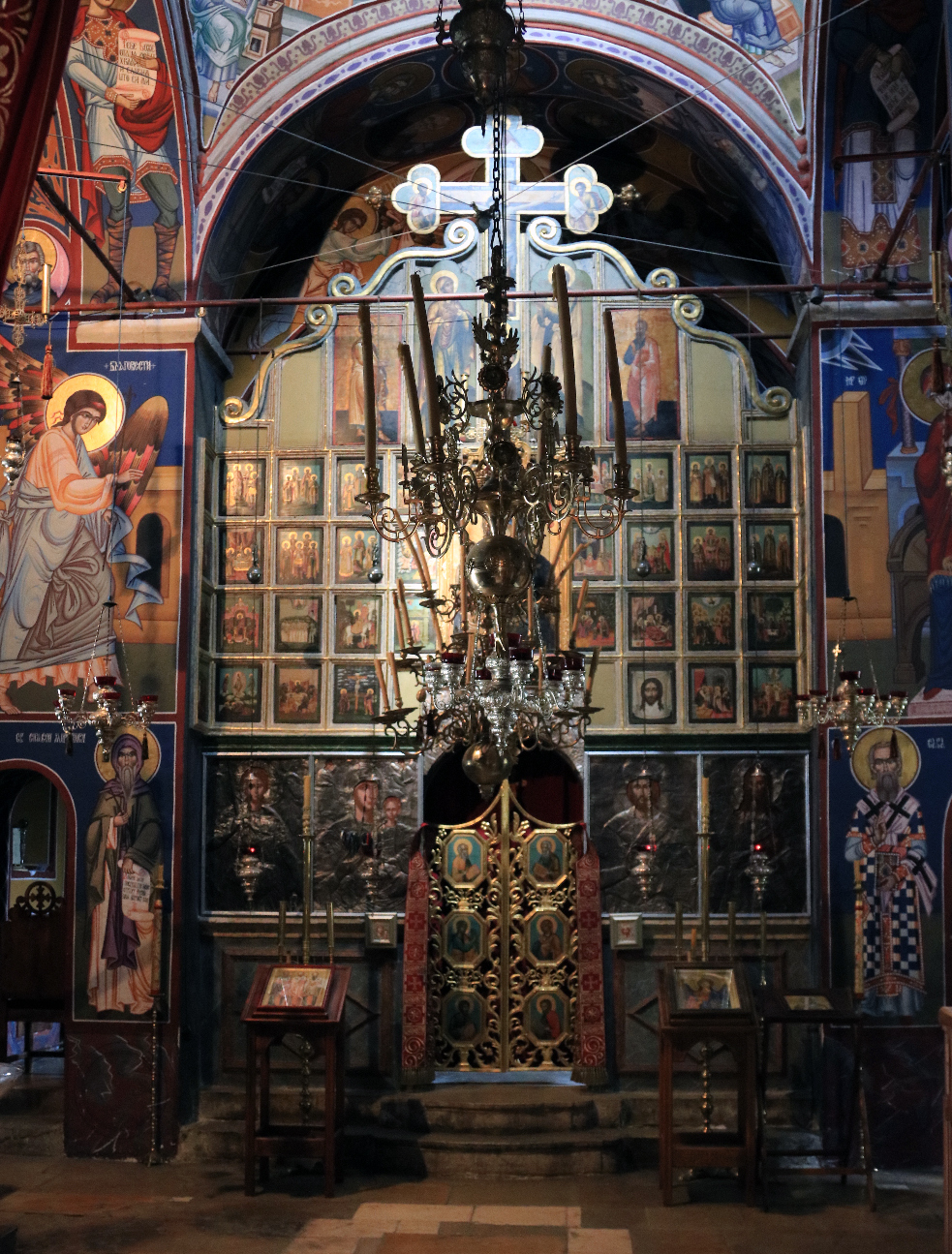
Iconostasis of the monastery

The monastery was built on top of an Ancient Roman site. Roman burial catacombs, Romanesque belfry, Gothic window and other parts of the building (including graves), show that the Eastern Orthodox monastery was likely previously home to a late medieval Catholic church or monastery (c. 14th century), whose architectural style was uncommon for the Serbian-Byzantine Orthodox churches of the time.

According to the latest synthesis of archaeological, architectural, and conservation-restoration research, the monastery’s church underwent three main construction phases: one in the late medieval period, another in the second half of the 16th century, and a final phase starting in the 1780s. Construction of the monastery's buildings began in the second half of the 16th century with eight additions and seven upgrades until the 1980s. Many walls beneath the earth, whose ground plan was much bigger than that of the current monastery, have been found at the site, along with stones from Roman times, as well as graves and artefacts from the Roman and late medieval ages. The most significant finding for dating the late medieval church is a fragment of a profiled Gothic frame with the remains of a rosette, found in a wall beneath a layer of cement mortar. As it is almost identical to the frame and rosette found at the Catholic church of St. Mary and Franciscan monastery in Bribir (founded in the late 13th-early 14th century, with various building works done in the 15th century), it shows they were produced from the same workshop (of Zadar or Šibenik), in the same time period and that the building was possibly related to the Šubić family.

According to the common folk story about the foundation of the Eastern Orthodox monastery, claimed by the Serb Orthodox eparchy's clergy, it was founded in 1345 or 1350 when it was listed as an endowment of Serbian princess Jelena Nemanjić Šubić, half-sister of the Serbian emperor Dušan and wife of Mladen III Šubić Bribirski (not Mladen the II), Croatian duke of Skradin and Bribir. However, this is a baseless late 19th century claim, made up and published by Serb Orthodox Bishop of Dalmatia Nikodim Milaš in his article Iz prošlosti pravoslavne crkve u Dalmaciji (From the history of Orthodox Church in Dalmatia, 1900) and Pravoslavna Dalmacija (Orthodox Dalmatia, 1901), in which, popular to the period and related to Greater Serbian ideology, various claims were forged about the pre-Ottoman presence of Serbs in Dalmatia. Such a claim is not found in any previous official Serb Orthodox schematism, leading to the conclusion that there is no historical information available about the monastery's foundation. Neither Croatian nor Serbian historians and archaeologists of the epoch mention such a claim.

An epigraphic inscription with a supposed date of 1402 written in the Arabic alphabet or Arabic numbers was also confirmed to be an archaeological forgery, the dating of which is uncommon for the Greek-East Orthodox style. The dating originally showed 1702, related to protopop Lazo Lazarićević. The fabrication was made by archimandrite Jerotije Kovačević in 1859. An alleged inscription from 1422 was also found to be originally dated to 1782.

The earliest source mentioning the Christian church or monastery was from 1458 by dragoman Cosmo Calavri Imberti, mentioning a certain monk named Pahomije (lat. Pachomius). The Ottoman census of 1550 showed the existence of the Church of St. Michael. According to a document by Gavrilo Avramović in 1578, it was seemingly independent from the metropolitan seat under the Serbian Patriarchate of Peć. According to some sources, including monastery engravings, the Eastern Orthodox monastery was most probably founded in 1577, while according to others, it can only be dated with certainty since the mid-17th century. Given the unstable political climate and weak economic conditions up until the mid-to-late 16th century, it would have been difficult to carry out major construction on a late medieval church. Therefore, the establishment and construction of the Eastern Orthodox monastery can be dated no earlier than the 1570s. According to one alleged document, the earliest reference to building activity dates back to 1601.

At the beginning of the Cretan War (1645–1669), specifically in 1647, the monastery's clergy became anti-Ottoman and entered the Venetian service after it was attacked and plundered by the Ottomans. The monks and local population soon fled to the Venetian Dalmatia, led by vladika Epifanije Stefanović and fifteen other priests, who professed a failed communion with the Catholic Church. Some claim that the Eastern Orthodox monks who supposedly fled founded Gomirje monastery in Gorski kotar, leaving Krka monastery abandoned for a long time until it was rebuilt in around 1787 by archimandrite Nikador Bogunović. In 1660 the monastery was partly renovated. Since then, especially between the 18th and 20th centuries, the monastery experienced extensive rebuilding, which shaped most of its current visual appearance.

From the 1960s onwards, the monastery was a place of annual gathering by local Serbs and Croats, but in August 1989, after the Gazimestan speech, many people from Serbia arrived, promoting Serbian national claims, later followed by formation of SAO Krajina and the beginning of the Croatian War of Independence. After Operation Storm in 1995 the monastery was looted, but not significantly, as it was protected by the Croatian police, abandoned, and the seminary shut down and relocated to Divčibare and, later, Foča. The monks returned in 1999, and the seminary reopened in 2001.

== Architectural features ==
The belltower of this monastery was built in the Romanesque style. Other monastery buildings from the 18th–19th century, the church, and the belfry are situated around a rectangular cloister with arcades.

The complex also includes a chapel of Saint Sava built in the 19th century under the tutelage of the Serbian Orthodox Bishop of Dalmatia, Stefan Knežević, as well as a new seminary building and an additional dormitory. The monastery has its archives and a library with a variety of ancient books and valuable items from the 14th to the 20th century, a collection of icons from the 15th and 18th century, silverware, embroideries and else, but a good part of it was moved in the 1990s to Serbia.

== See also ==
- List of Serbian Orthodox monasteries
