= Pavao Zorčić =

Pavao Zorčić, O.S.B.M. (c.1620 – 23 January 1685) was a Serbian-Croatian Greek Catholic hierarch. He was the titular bishop of Plataea and Vicar Apostolic of Marča from 1671 to 1685.

== Life ==
He was born in Sveti Ivan Žabno, Habsburg's Kingdom of Croatia (present-day Croatia) around 1620. As a young person he joined a monastery in Ivanić-Grad and was an author of an apology about unity with the Holy See.

He was appointed as the Bishop by the Holy See on 20 November 1671, and consecrated to the Episcopate on January 1672. The principal consecrator was Archbishop Onofrio Costantini.

Bishop Pavao Zorčić was a fiery apologetic against the attacks of the Orthodox against the Greek Catholic Union of Marča. In this sense he erected the Greek Catholic Seminary in Zagreb (1680), which started its work in the academic year 1681. It is the oldest Greek Catholic seminary (maius) in Europe outside Rome.

He died in Marča (present-day Stara Marča in Zagreb County, Croatia) on 23 January 1685.

Catholic Church titles
Preceded by Gabrijel Mijakić	Vicar Apostolic of Marča; 1671–1685	Succeeded by Marko Zorčić
