= Anton Franki =

Croatian Catholic priest and professor of church history and canon law

Anton Franki (November 2, 1844 – January 30, 1908) was a Croatian church historian who was politically active in the Illyrian movement, which made him a victim of the Magyarization of the Ban Károly Khuen-Héderváry. He was professor in Zadar and Zagreb and was rector of the Greek Catholic Seminary in Zagreb.

== Biography ==
Anton Franki was born in Dalmatia, in the city of Omišalj. He was ordained a priest in 1867 for the Roman Catholic Diocese of Krk and continued his post-graduate studies in Vienna. After his doctoral studie in Vienna he returned to Dalmatia and became professor for Church history and Canon law in the Diocesan Seminary in Zadar in 1878.

Beside his theological work he was very interested in the Greek Catholic Church of Croatia and an exponent of the Croatian national movement. Because of this he moved to Zagreb, where the center of the movement was, and became a close friend of Tadija Smičiklas, a vanguard of the movement and professor at the Faculty of Philosophy at the University of Zagreb. Smičiklas attacked Ban Károly Khuen-Héderváry already and tried to focus all the Croatian intellectuals to defend the interest of Croatia against the Magyarization. Franki became 1882 professor for Speculative theology at the University of Zagreb, later he became professor for Church history.

In 1885 Franki became rector of the Greek Catholic Seminary in Zagreb. Franki became a leader and important advisor in the Eparchy of Križevci.

But in 1891 his secrete work against Ban Károly Khuen-Héderváry became public by an internal opponent and traitor. Franki lost his position as professor at the university and rector of the Greek Catholic Seminary. He had left the capital and returned to his hometown in poverty.

== Selected bibliography ==
- Franki, Anton (1881). Dvie poslanice dvaju pravoslavnih episkopa u Dalmaciji : obielodanjene prigodom slavenskoga hodočašća u Rimu [Two letters of orthodox bishops from Dalmatia: Published on occasion of the Slavic pilgrimage to Rome] (in Croatian). Zadar, Ivan Woditzka.
- Franki, Anton (1878). Kakova to knjiga? Kakov to povjestničar? : [osvrt na] Postanje svjetovne papinske vlasti ili Pedeset godina talijanske historije [What′s That for a Book? What Kind of a Historian is This?: A Look Back to Secular Papal Authority or 50. Years of Italian History] (in Croatian). Zadar, Ivan Woditzka.

== Sources ==
- Bozanić, Anton (2012). Anton Franki : (1844.-1908.) : svećenik, profesor, znanstvenik [Anton Franki (1844–1908): priest, professor, researcher] (in Croatian). Omišalj.
