= Gabrijel Palković =

Gabrijel Palković, O.S.B.M. (15 April 1715 – 25 February 1759) was a Ruthenian and Croatian Greek Catholic hierarch. He was the titular bishop Drizipara and Vicar Apostolic of Marča from 1752 to 1759.

== Biography ==
Born in Zakarpattia, Habsburg monarchy (present day – Ukraine) in 1715, Palković was ordained a priest on 12 November 1741 as member of the Order of Saint Basil the Great. Before his nomination as bishop, Fr. Palković was the member of the Saint Nicholas Basilian Monastery in Mukacheve.

He was confirmed as the Bishop by the Holy See on 4 August 1752. He was consecrated to the Episcopate in September 1752. The principal consecrator was Bishop Manuil Olshavskyi.

He died in Karlovac on 25 February 1759.

Catholic Church titles
Preceded by Teofil Pašić	Vicar Apostolic of Marča; 1752–1759	Succeeded by Vasilije Božičković
