= Epifanije Stefanović =

Epifanije Stefanović (Serbian Cyrillic: Епифаније Стефановић) was a Serbian Orthodox Archbishop of Dalmatia, who in 1648 entered a failed communion with the Catholic Church.

== Life ==
In mid-1648, during the Cretan War (1645–69), Stefanović and fifteen other priests from the Krka monastery, led reportedly up to 10 thousand Orthodox people (most probably an exaggeration), into the Venetian Dalmatia, and were gifted a small church of St. Mary of Malinska near Zadar (but received only temporary in 1655). In early November 1648, Stefanović and the priests signed a communion with the Catholic Church (with preserved Stefanović letters and stamps), with his emissary in Rome in mid-November, and early December the case was discussed by the Congregation for the Evangelization of Peoples. However, the fate of the union remains uncertain, as there's no information after 1649 (around when happened Stefanović's death), and already after 1660s is reported a dissatisfaction between Catholic bishops and Orthodox monks.

Nikodim Milaš (1845–1915) refuted the historicity of the events and Stefanović himself, considering that the Orthodox community at that time strongly resisted Catholic propaganda, supporting the Serbian Patriarch Maksim I through the emissary monk Kiril. Mile Bogović rejected Milaš's opinion, as even Ilarion Ruvarac confirmed Stefanović as a historical figure, and that the official union was short lived after the subsequent death of Stefanović as the Orthodox monks turned against the Catholic Church, thus the attempt of Uniatism of the Serbs in Dalmatia failed.

== See also ==
- Catholic Church in Serbia
