= Giovanni Pasquali =

Catholic missionary

- Born: 1586; Cattaro, Venetian Republic
- Died: after 1665
- Other names: Giovani, Đovani

Giovanni Pasquali (Serbian: Đovani Paskvali; 1586–1665) was a Catholic missionary who was in charge for Catholicization of Orthodox Serbs, first in Dalmatia and then in Montenegro and Serbia.

== Early life ==
Pasquali was a member of a noble family from Kotor. Members of this family, who were nobility of Tvrtko I of Bosnia, came to Kotor in 15th century. He was born in 1586 and baptised on 22 May 1586. His father was Kristofor de Dominis, son of Grisogon, and his sister was Cecilia.

== Missionary activities ==
On 18 August 1641 Pasquali, then a missionary in Dalmatia, reported that his everyday activities included visiting and converting Orthodox Serbs to Catholicism. After Leonardi's death, Pasquali succeeded him in his missionary duties in Montenegro and Serbia, which marked the beginning of large-scale planned activities on Catholicisation of the Orthodox population of this region.

In 1643 Pasquali reported that 7,000 "schismatic" (Orthodox) and "heretic" (Muslim) Serbs live in Montenegro. On 1 December 1645 he wrote a letter to the Sacred Congregation for the Propagation of the Faith and requested four or five Catholic priests to be sent to the coast of Montenegro populated with Orthodox Serbs, for religious conversion purposes. He recommended that those priests first learn to speak Serbian and write using Serbian Cyrillic script. On 5 August 1646 Pasquali wrote a letter to the Sacred Congregation and informed them that Kotor bishop Vićentije Buća convinced many people to accept Catholicism. On 29 April 1648 Pasquali reported from Grbalj that he had a lot of work due to the region being full of Serb newcomers who again applied for Venetian service.

Pasquali maintained a very good relation with Orthodox bishop Makarije. In February 1665 Makarije wrote to the Congregation, praised Pasquali and requested that the Congregation should support Pasquali with money and books. In August 1665 the Congregation responded positively to those requests and sent books and money to Pasquali.

== Sources ==
- institut (1959). Istorijski zapisi. Istorijski institut SR Crne Gore.
- Kalezić, Dimitrije M.; Berić, Dušan P. (1987). Sveti Vasilije Ostroški (Jovanović) u svome vremenu. Manastir Ostrog.
- Čoralić, Lovorka (2007). Iz prošlosti Boke: odabrane teme. Meridijani. ISBN 978-953-239-070-4.
- JAZU (1976). Acta Centri Academiae Scientiarum et Artium Slavorum Meridionalium Iaderae Constituti. Centar Jugoslavenske akademija znanosti i umjetnosti u Zadru.
- Cetinjsko (1936). Zapisi. Cetinjsko istorijsko društvo.
- Kostić, Lazo M. (1963). Ćirilica i srpstvo.
- Dimitrijević, Vladimir (2002). Pravoslavna crkva i rimokatolicizam: (od dogmatike do asketike). LIO. ISBN 9788683697045.
- Јовановић, Батрић (1986). Црногорци о себи (од владике Данила до 1941): прилог историји црногорске нације. Народна књ. ISBN 978-86-331-0048-9.
- Kostić, Lazo M. (1961). O srpskom karakteru Boke Kotorske. Sfairos.
