= Simeon Vratanja =

The Right Reverend Simeon Vratanja Симеон Вратања
- Bishop of Vretanija; Bishop of Marča
- Church: Serbian Orthodox Church (until 1611); Eastern Catholic Church (since 1611)
- Elected: 1609 (Orthodox); 1611 (Catholic)
- In office: 1609–11 (Orthodox); 1611–30 (Catholic)

Orders
- Ordination: by Serbian Patriarch Jovan Kantul (Orthodox); Pope Paul V (Catholic)

Personal details
- Born: 16th century Ottoman Empire
- Died: 1630 Habsburg monarchy
- Residence: Eparchy of Marča

Simeon Vratanja (fl. c. 1600 – 1630) was the first Serbian Orthodox bishop of the Eparchy of Marča (1609–11), the westernmost eparchy of the Serbian Patriarchate of Peć, and after accepting Uniatism became the first Eastern Catholic Bishop of Marča (1611–28).

== Establishment of Vretanija as an eparchy of the Patriarchate of Peć ==
There are different views on the year of establishment of Vretanija as an eparchy of the Patriarchate of Peć; according to Johann von Csaplovics (1780–1847), it was established in 1578 and its first bishop was Metropolitan Gavrilo to whom Simeon was subordinated as archimandrite in Marča. There is an account that in ca. 1600 Simeon (episcopus nationis Serbicae) and other Orthodox clergy, with many of their people, Serbs, also called "Rascians", fled into Austrian territories, and resided in the Marča Monastery. On Vidovdan (28 June) 1609, Simeon was appointed the bishop of Orthodox Serbs in the Habsburg monarchy by Serbian Patriarch Jovan. Simeon had jurisdiction over the Serbs that settled in what is today Croatia. According to Aleksa Ivić, this appointment marked the establishment of the Eparchy of Vratanija.

== Eastern Catholicism ==
Being under strong pressure from Croatian Catholic clergy and state officials to recognize Papal jurisdiction, and to convert the population of his bishopric to Eastern Catholicism (Uniate), Simeon visited the Pope in 1611 and recognized his jurisdiction and maybe the Union of Florence as well. He confessed Catholicism in front of Robert Bellarmine. The strongest influence to his decision was Martin Dobrović who convinced him to recognize Papal jurisdiction and to accept Eastern Catholicism. In November 1611 the Pope appointed Simeon as bishop of Slavonia, Croatia and Hungary, while in reality his jurisdiction was limited to Orthodox population of Slavonia and Croatia. The Pope granted all former estates of the Catholic Monastery of All Saints to the Marča Monastery. On 21 November 1611 Marča was established as bishopric of the Eastern Catholic Church. It is estimated that in 1611 it had around 60,000 members. Simeon continued to use the Slavic language, Eastern Orthodox church rites, the Julian calendar, and did not severe ties with the Patriarchate of Peć, nor did he become a vicar of the Catholic bishop of Zagreb. Only part of the Marča brotherhood and local Orthodox Serbs followed him in the Uniatism. When the Serbian patriarch received news that Simeon had accepted union with the Catholic church he deposed Simeon from his position in 1628. According to Simeon himself, he abdicated, and claimed that his successor Maksim Predojević had killed 15 Turks. Simeon died in 1630.

== Titles ==
- He was named bishop (vladika) of the Western Provinces (западних страна) by Serbian Patriarch Jovan in 1609.
- He signed himself "Rascian (Serb) bishop" (Simeon Vratanya, rascianorum episсорus). Mentioned as such on 15 January 1615.
- Pope Paul V recognized Simeon Vratanja as a "true Episcope of Rascians of Greek rite" within the borders of Hungary, Slavonia, Croatia and Carniola, while the Emperor Leopold I had already give him the title of "svidički" Episcope and the authority over the settlers of eastern rite in Croatia.

== Annotations ==
1. Due to Vretani(i), a toponym for the "westernmost parts", the Catholic administration in Croatia started calling him Vretanji, Vretanić and Vretanja. His byname, derived from the name of his eparchy, is rendered "Vretanja" (Симеон Вретања), and scarcer as "Vratanja" (Симеон Вратања) in Serbian. He is mentioned as Latin: de Simeone Vretania scismatico in a 12 November 1611 document. Zagreb bishop Bratulić called him Simeon "Vartana" and "Vratana" in a 21 February 1611 document.

== Sources ==
- Ćirković, Sima M. (2008). Srbi među europskim narodima. Golden marketing-Tehnička knjiga. ISBN 978-953-212-338-8.
- Grujić, Radoslav M.; Krestić, Vasilije (1989). Апологија српскога народа у Хрватској и Славонији. Просвета. p. 69. ISBN 9788607004263.
- Jačov, Marko (1986). Списи Конгрегације за пропаганду вере у Риму о Србима. Српска академија наука и уметности. ISBN 978-86-7025-037-6.
- Kolarić, Juraj (2002). Povijest kršćanstva u Hrvata: Katolička crkva. Hrvatski studiji Sveučilišta u Zagrebu. ISBN 978-953-6682-45-4.
- Kostić, Lazo M. (1965). Просторни размештај Срба y прошлости и садашњости (PDF). Munich: Logos.
- Jugoslavenska akademija znanosti i umjetnosti (1917). Djela Jugoslavenske akademije znanosti i umjetnosti. Vol. 28. Tisak Dioničke tiskare.
- Kašić, Dušan Lj (1967). Srbi i pravoslavlje u Slavoniji i sjevernoj Hrvatskoj. Savez udruženja pravosl. sveštenstva SR Hrvatske.
- Kašić, Dušan Lj (1988). Srpska naselja i crkve u sjevernoj Hrvatskoj i Slavoniji. Savez udruženja pravoslavnih sveštenika SR Hrvatske.
- Kudelić, Zlatko (2007). Isusovačko izvješće o krajiškim nemirima 1658. i 1666. godine i o marčanskom biskupu Gabrijelu Mijakiću (1663.-1670.). Hrvatski institut za povijest.
- Kudelić, Zlatko (2010). Čaplovičeva povijest Marčanske biskupije. Hrvatski institut za povijest.
- Medaković, Dejan (1971). Putevi srpskog baroka. Nolit.
- Miltojević, Milutin (2014). "СРПСКA ИСТОРИОГРАФИЈА О УНИЈАЋЕЊУ СРБА У СЕДАМНАЕСТОМ ВЕКУ". University of Niš.
- Ivić, Aleksa (1909). Seoba srba u hrvatsku i slavoniju: prilog ispitivanju srpske prošlodti tokom 16. i 17. veka. Sremski karlovci.
- Radeka, Milan (1975). Gornja krajina III Karlovačko vladičanstvo. Savez udruženja pravoslavnih sveštenika SR Hrvatske.
