= Slavic honorifics =

Courtesy forms of address

Speakers of Slavic languages and Lithuanians (Baltic languages) use two main sets of honorifics. West Slavs and Ukrainians use the title Pan, South Slavs and Russians use Gospodin, while Belarusians use either Pan or Spadar, and Lithuanians use either Ponas or Gaspadorius.

== (G)ospodin ==
An interesting etymological conundrum, an origin of the large family of honorific based on gospodь, is reflected by number of theories surrounding it. Most recent and interesting one is proposed by linguist Adrian Poruciuc, who asserts an early borrowing from the Old Germanic compound gōd-spōd (good fortune), in opposition to proposed unconvincing explanation based on Proto-Slavic compound gostьpodь, which is, also, still visible in English godspeed.

== Usage of Pan ==
Pan is used to varying degrees in a number of Slavic languages – the West Slavic languages Polish, Czech, Slovak, East Slavic languages Ukrainian and Belarusian, and the Balto-Slavic language Lithuanian (Ponas). Historically, Pan was equivalent to "Lord" or "Master" (ruler, suzerain).

Pan and its variations are most common in Poland. The male form is Pan, the feminine form is Pani. Panna is sometimes used to refer to young women (comparable to Fräulein in German and Mademoiselle in French) but is becoming less common. The collective is Państwo for a group of men and women, Panowie for a group of men, and Panie for a group of women. The use of Pan and its variations differs significantly from English honorifics. It is used as an honorific (roughly equivalent to Mr) before the name (first name and surname, only surname, or only first name) and as a form of address without the name (roughly equivalent to "Sir").

Use of Pan with the first name in Poland marks a combination of familiarity and respect. Unlike "Sir", Pan is used both ways between persons of both equal and unequal rank (a waiter will address a guest as Pan, and the customer reciprocates, much like using Monsieur in French). Using Pan with only the first name is regarded as a disrespectful way of addressing people, even somewhat condescending, when it is used to a superior. Using Pan with only the surname, however, is normally respectful if talking about somebody. Many people in Poland find it impolite to address somebody using Pan with the surname. Pan is never used about oneself (unlike "Mr").

"Pan" is also used as a kind of personal pronoun in a similar way as Usted in Spanish or Lei in Italian (unlike French 'Monsieur' or German 'Herr', which require the use of 'vous' and 'Sie' respectively).

== Other titles ==
Spadar appears in Belarusian. It is a simplified version of Haspadar, which is related to Gospodin or the Slovene Gospodar. Gaspadorius and gaspadinė for a woman appears in Lithuanian language. It is an archaic word and it is not used today in the general Lithuanian language, however it is not extinct and sometimes used in a countryside. It originated from Proto-Slavic, ultimately from *gospodь, compare Bulgarian, Serbo-Croatian gospodar (господар) and Ukrainian hospodar, which means householder, master of the house or head of a household. Additionally, usage of different forms, gospodin and gospodar, could be related to context, where gospodin translates as Sir and gospodar as Lord.

Vladyka (literally, ruler/master), is used when referring to a bishop or patriarch in Eastern Orthodox churches.

Sudar, appearing without a personal name, was formerly used in Russian. It may be connected to the Russian title of a head of state, Gosudar. Its Ukrainian counterpart was (Pane) Dobrodiyu or (Pani) Dobrodiyko (pl. Dobrodiyi). Those titles became obsolete and are now found only in novels. Appeal of Shanovni Dobrodiyi ("Dear Goodwill") is still used solemnly to many people.

In Ukrainian, Panych was once used to refer to noble youngsters. It is spelled Panicz in Polish.

=== Under communism ===
The equivalent of Comrade replaced most titles in the Communist-era Eastern bloc, including non-aligned Yugoslavia, except Poland.

In Poland, Obywatel ("citizen") replaced Pan, which was restored after the fall of Communism. The word "citizen" was chosen for ideological reasons, as pan (sir) was historically a title of a nobleman. The equivalent of Russian comrade – towarzysz – was a title reserved only for communist party members, while in former Yugoslavia, the equivalent of comrade is masculine drug (see: A Clockwork Orange) and feminine drugarica and was widely used for all persons.

== See also ==
- Mr.
- Lord
- Polish name
