= Oriental College of Eichstätt =

Coordinates: 48.8906°N 11.1857°E

Collegium Orientale in Eichstätt (abbreviation: COr) is an Eastern Catholic seminary and college under the jurisdiction of the Roman Catholic diocese of Eichstätt, Bavaria, Germany. It is responsible for the formation of future priests and provides an environment for married and celibate priests seeking higher degrees at the Catholic University of Eichstätt. The college is the only ecumenical seminary that accepts candidates of the various and traditions of the Eastern Orthodox and Catholic Churches.

== History ==
Archimandrite Dr. Andreas Thiermeyer, a diocesan priest of Eichstätt, founded COr and became its first rector. Consecrated on 1 September 1998, COr is an independent institution of the diocese of Eichstätt and situated next to Collegium Willibaldinum, Eichstätt’s first seminary for the formation of Latin rite seminarians.

== Present situation ==
Currently, COr houses forty seminarians and priests belonging to different Eastern Churches: Greek Catholic Churches, Ukrainian Orthodox Church, Georgian Orthodox Church, Armenian Apostolic Church, Syro-Malankara Catholic Church, Syro-Malabar Catholic Church, and, Maronite Church. COr’s community consists of men, women, and children coming from Ukraine, Slovakia, Hungary, Poland, Syria, Lebanon, India, Georgia, and Armenia.

COr has a spiritual typikon that contains its rules and regulations of the daily life of the community. It publishes ContaCOr, a periodical in which the main events at the seminary are documented and the theological research of its students are published. COr also organizes conferences on topics dealing with the history, spirituality and theology of the Eastern Churches, e.g., the conference in 2015 on the Armenian genocide.

COr’s current rector is Archpriest Dr. Oleksandr Petrynko (Ukraine), its vice-rector Archimandrite Dr. Thomas Kremer (Germany), and its spiritual director Fr. Ivan Kachala (Ukraine).
