= Rafael Levaković =

O F M Most Reverend Rafael Levaković
- Archbishop of Achrida
- Church: Catholic Church
- Archdiocese: Archdiocese of Achrida
- In office: 1647–1650
- Successor: Andrea Bogdani

Orders
- Consecration: 2 June 1647 by Pier Luigi Carafa

Personal details
- Born: 1597 Jastrebarsko, Republic of Venice (today Croatia)
- Died: 1650 (aged 52–53) Zadar, Republic of Venice (today Croatia)

Rafael Levaković (also Raphael Levacovich) O.F.M. (c. 1597 – 1649) was a Venetian Franciscan prelate who served as Archbishop of Achrida (1647–1650); and Glagolitic writer who set foundations for Slavic liturgy based on the missionary concept of the Catholic Church. Levaković actively worked on religious union of the Serbian Orthodox Serbs of Croatia with Catholic Church.

== Biography ==
Raphael Levacovich was born in Jastrebarsko, Republic of Venice (today Croatia) in 1597 (some sources say 1607) and ordained a priest in the Order of Friars Minor.

== Translation of the liturgical books ==
In the 17th century, the Roman Catholic Church followed the reformist example of Protestantism and published liturgical books in a language understandable to most South Slavs. This task was given to Sacred Congregation for the Propagation of the Faith, which engaged Levaković. At the explicit instructions of the Pope, Levaković's activities were supported by Metodije Terlecki. In 1628 Levaković published Nauk Krstjanski and in 1631 Misal. In 1640 Benedikt Vinković, a Catholic bishop of the Archdiocese of Zagreb, had the intention to depose Maksim Predojević, Serb bishop of the Bishopric of Marča, and appoint Rafael Levaković instead.

== Episcopate ==
On 27 May 1647, he was appointed during the papacy of Pope Innocent X as Archbishop of Achrida in Ohrid. On 2 June 1647, he was consecrated bishop by Pier Luigi Carafa, Cardinal-Priest of Santi Silvestro e Martino ai Monti, with Ranuccio Scotti Douglas, Bishop of Borgo San Donnino, and Alessandro Vittrici, Bishop Emeritus of Alatri, serving as co-consecrators. He served as Archbishop of Achrida until his death in 1650.

== Bibliography ==
Works of Rafael Levaković include:

- Nauk karstjanski kratak (Glagolitic), (Rome, 1628)
- Azbukividnik (1629, 1693), (Glagolitic, Latin script and Cyrillic script)
- Missal rimskij va ezik slovenskij (Rome, 1631)
- Časoslov Rimski (1648)
- De Illyrica lingua
- Dialogus de antiquorum Illyricorum lingua
- Historiola episcopatus ac dioecesis ecclesiae Zagrabiensis
- De ecclesiae Zagrabiensis fundatione
- De Spiritus Sancti processione
- Ordo et series cleri Dioecesis Zagrabiensis 8. Martii 1574. in synodo
- eleven letters to Zageb bishop Benedikt Vinković

== See also ==
- List of Glagolitic books

Catholic Church titles
Preceded by	Archbishop of Achrida; 1647–1650	Succeeded by Andrea Bogdani

== Sources ==
- Umetnosti, Srpska Akademija Nauka i (1946). Glas (in Serbian).
- Kašić, Dušan Lj (1988). Srpska naselja i crkve u sjevernoj Hrvatskoj i Slavoniji. Savez udruženja pravoslavnih sveštenika SR Hrvatske.
- Nazor, Anica (2008). Knjiga o hrvatskoj glagoljici: "Ja slovo znajući govorim--". Erasmus. ISBN 978-953-6132-83-6.
- Nazor, Anica (2013), "Levaković, Rafael", Croatian Biographical Lexicon (HBL) (in Croatian), Miroslav Krleža Lexicographical Institute
- "Levaković, Rafael", Croatian Encyclopedia (in Croatian), Miroslav Krleža Institute of Lexicography, 2013
