= Benedikt Vinković =

Croatian Catholic prelate

Benedikt Benko Vinković
- Bishop of Zagreb
- Church: Catholic Church
- Diocese: Diocese of Zagreb
- In office: 28 April 1642 – 2 December 1642
- Predecessor: Franjo Ergelski Hasanović
- Successor: Martin Bogdan
- Previous post: Bishop of Pécs (1633-1642)

Orders
- Ordination: 16 April 1609
- Consecration: 19 March 1634

Personal details
- Born: 1581 Jastrebarsko, Kingdom of Croatia, Habsburg monarchy
- Died: 2 December 1642 (aged 60–61) Zagreb, Kingdom of Croatia, Habsburg monarchy

Benedikt Benko Vinković (Latin: Benedictus II Vinkovich) (1581 – 2 December 1642) was a Croatian prelate of the Catholic Church who served as the bishop of Pécs from 1630 to 1637 and the bishop of Zagreb from 1637 to his death in 1642.

== Early life ==
Vinković was born in 1581 in Jastrebarsko. While some contemporary sources say his parents, Petar and Magdalena, were free peasants, others, including Toma Kovačević, claim they were serfs. During his early years, Vinković was educated by Jesuits in seminaries in Erdelj, Zagreb, and Vienna. In 1606 Vinković became rector of the Ilyrian College in Bologne, and in 1608 he received a PhD in philosophy.

In 1610, Vinković became a canon of the Diocese of Zagreb and organised the foundation of the Croatian College in Vienna. As a representative at the Diet of Hungary in Pressburg, he staunchly defended the interests of Croatia.

In 1611, he became archdeacon in Čazma; in 1612, he became archdeacon of Komarnica. In 1619, Vinković served as an envoy of the Croatian Diet sent to the Emperor to discuss Serb-related issues. In 1622, he was appointed as cathedral archdeacon.

Due to Vatican policies on Ottoman-controlled territories in Europe, several Jesuit priests who fluently spoke different Slavic languages were appointed to higher positions in the Catholic church. Vinković was appointed bishop in Ottoman-controlled Pécs in 1630. Aside from his native language, he also used Latin and Hungarian in his correspondences. Vinković was a supporter of Martin Borković's Counter-Reformation activities in Međimurje.

== Relations with the Eastern Orthodox ==
Vinković is among the notable clergy that tried to unite the Eastern Orthodox populace and clergy on the territory of the Military Frontier that belonged to the Diocese of Zagreb with the Catholic Church.

According to Serb historian Slavko Gavrilović, Vinković (and Petar Petretić) wrote numerous inaccurate texts meant to incite hatred against Serbs and Eastern Orthodox Christians, some of which included advice on how to Catholicize the Serbs. Vinković also targeted the bishop of Marča, Maksim Predojević, whom he reported to the Sacred Congregation for the Propagation of the Faith after refusing to support the conversion of the population of his bishopric to Catholicism.

Vinković estimated the number of Serbs in Slavonia to be about 74,000. In 1640 Vinković requested Predojević's deposition from the Roman Curia in his 1640 letter to the Pope's nuncio in Vienna. Vinković claimed that Predojević was subordinate to him and Vinković expected to receive some income from him. He also intended to appoint Rafael Levaković as bishop of Marča instead of Predojević.

In the same year, he reported that Serbs still used the Cyrillic script. In a 1673 letter, Vinković reported that some Serbs from Istria, Senj, and Vinodolski had been converted to Catholicism.

== Sources ==
- Kampuš, Ivan; Karaman, Igor (1995). Zagreb through a thousand years: from ancient settlements to a modern city. Školska knj. ISBN 9789530605855.
- Kiadó, Mikszáth (1997). Etnografija Hrvata u Mađarskoj.
- Kašić, Dušan Lj (1967). Srbi i pravoslavlje u Slavoniji i sjevernoj Hrvatskoj. Savez udruženja pravosl. sveštenstva SR Hrvatske.
- akademija (1995). Zbornik o Srbima u Hrvatskoj. Srpska akademija nauka i umetnosti. ISBN 9788670250550.
- Ćorović, Vladimir; Petrović, Dragoljub S (2006). Историја Срба. Dom i škola. ISBN 9788683751303.
- Gavrilović, Slavko (1993). Iz istorije Srba u Hrvatskoj, Slavoniji i Ugarskoj: XV-XIX vek. Filip Višnjić. ISBN 9788673631264.
- tisak (1917). Djela Jugoslavenske akademije znanosti i umjetnosti. Tisak Dioničke tiskare.
- Batelja, Juraj (1995). Zagrebački biskupi i nadbiskupi. Školska knj. ISBN 9789530605978.
- штампарија (1922). Прилози за књижевност, језик, историју и фолклор. Државна штампарија Краљевине Срба, Хрвата и Словенаца.
- Sakcinski, Ivan Kukuljević (1869). Književnici u Hrvatah iz prve polovine XVII vieka s ove strane Velebita. [With 23 facsimile autographs.]. Štamparija Dragutina Albrechta.
- Žutić, Nikola (1997). Rimokatolička crkva i hrvatstvo: od ilirske ideje do velikohrvatske realizacije 1453-1941. ISI.
- Horvat, Rudolf (1944). Poviest Međimurja. Hrvatski Rodoljub.
- (Croatia), Catholic Church. Archdiocese of Zagreb (1966). Šematizam Zagrebačke Nadbiskupije. Nadbiskupski duhovni stol.
- Krasić, Stjepan (2009). Počelo je u Rimu: Katolička obnova i normiranje hrvatskoga jezika u XVII. stoljeću. Matica Hrvatska. ISBN 978-953-6316-76-2.
- Društvo (1996). Istorijski glasnik: organ Društva istoričara SR Srbije. Društvo.
- Milosavljević, Petar (2002). Srbi i njihov jezik: hrestomatija. Trebnik.
- Kašić, Dušan Lj (1988). Srpska naselja i crkve u sjevernoj Hrvatskoj i Slavoniji. Savez udruženja pravoslavnih sveštenika SR Hrvatske.

=== Journals ===
- Kudelić, Zlatko (2000-12-21). "Izvješće zagrebačkoga biskupa Benedikta Vinkovića apostolskom nunciju Casparu Mattheiju o Marčanskoj biskupiji i Vlasima iz 1640. godine" [Report of the bishop of Zagreb Benedikt Vinković to Apostolic Nuncio Caspar Matthei on the Diocese of Marča and the Vlachs from 1640]. Povijesni prilozi (in Croatian). 19: 153–179.
