= Petar Petretić =

Croatian prelate

The Most Reverend Petar Petretić
- Bishop of Zagreb
- Church: Catholic Church
- Diocese: Zagreb
- Appointed: 1 February 1649
- Predecessor: Martin Bogdan
- Successor: Martin Borković

Orders
- Ordination: 1632

Personal details
- Born: c. 1604 Sošice, Croatia, Habsburg monarchy
- Died: 12 October 1667 (aged 62–63) Zagreb, Croatia, Habsburg monarchy
- Buried: Zagreb Cathedral
- Denomination: Catholic
- Education: Collegium Croaticum Viennense

Petar Petretić (c. 1604 – 12 October 1667) was a Croatian prelate of the Catholic Church who served as the bishop of Zagreb from 1648 to 1667.

== Early life ==
Petretić was born to a poor Croat Catholic family in Sošice in Žumberak, Croatia. His father was a soldier. At first, he was educated in the Jesuit Gymnasium in Zagreb and then, on 20 November 1629, he went to study theology at Collegium Croaticum Viennense in Vienna. Petretić studied there for three years but didn't receive a theology or canon law degree, though he was well acquainted with the latter due to private interest. While studying in Vienna, Petretić was appointed the administrator of the College on 28 May 1631. Appointing seminarians as administrators was common due to their connection with their colleagues. He held the office until 17 May 1633. Petretić was ordained to the priesthood as a college head in 1632. The same year, while he was still in Vienna, Petretić was appointed canon of the Diocese of Zagreb. He returned to Zagreb, where he administered the diocesan seminary from 1635 to 1639. Afterwards, he was appointed the dean of the Cathedral parish and led its economy. After finishing his one-year term, Bishop Benedikt Vinković appointed him the archdeacon in Kalnik. From 1641 to 1644, he worked in the diocesan judiciary and headed the diocesan vinnery. In 1643, Bishop Martin Bogdan, with the recommendation from King Ferdinand III, appointed Petretić the great provost of Zagreb.

== Episcopate ==
After Bishop Bogdan died in 1647, King Ferdinand III proposed the Holy See to appoint Petretić as his successor on 4 February 1648. The appointment was confirmed on 1 February 1649.
