= Martin Dobrović =

Catholic priest (1599–1621)

- Born: The end of the 16th century
- Died: 1621
- Other names: Martin Dubravić, Martinus Dobrouitius
- Occupation: Catholic priest

Martin Dobrović or Martin Dubravić (1599–1621) was a Catholic priest. After finishing his education in Graz, he became a parson of Ivanić Grad and later became a priest in the Roman Catholic Archdiocese of Zagreb.

== Biography ==
Martin Dobrović was originally a Serbian Orthodox Christian of a Bosnian Vlach background. His parents had migrated from Bosnia to what is now modern-day Croatia. With a recommendation from the Bishop of Ljubljana, Thomas Chrön, the Catholic Church educated him as a priest at a school in Graz. He studied there from 1599 to 1608. As a student of literature, he wrote a song entitled Eidem, (Latin: Litterarum humaniorum studiosus) which was published in 1601. After graduating, Dobrović became parson of Ivanić and chaplain of the German Military Garrison in Ivanić.

As parson of Ivanić Grad, Dobrović actively tried to convert Eastern Orthodox Serbians, who had migrated from the Ottoman Empire to Catholicism. However, his endeavors were not successful. He began his endeavors before Simeon Vratanja was appointed as the bishop of Marča. In 1609, Dobrović was authorised by Pope Paul V, to bring Eastern Orthodox Christians to the union with the Catholic Church as Eastern Catholics. Dobrović convinced Vratanja to accept Eastern Catholicism and to recognise the Pope's jurisdiction over Eastern Catholic dioceses. In 1611, Dobrović and Vretanja traveled to Rome together. Simeon met with the Pope and formally accepted Eastern Catholicism. In March 1613, in Marča Monastery, Dobrović and Simeon had a meeting with several notable Serbian dukes and tried to convince them to convert to Eastern Catholicism and to accept the oversight of the Roman Catholic Archdiocese of Zagreb. The union was mostly unsuccessful and didn't leave a significant mark.

Dobrović died in 1621.

== Sources ==
- HKD (2005). Marulić. Hrvatsko književno društvo sv. Ćirila i Metoda.
- Kolarić, Juraj (2002). Povijest kršćanstva u Hrvata: Katolička crkva. Hrvatski studiji Sveučilišta u Zagrebu. ISBN 978-953-6682-45-4.
- (Croatia), Catholic Church. Archdiocese of Zagreb (1966). Šematizam Zagrebačke Nadbiskupije. Nadbiskupski duhovni stol.
- Institut (2002). Croatica Christiana Periodica. Institut za crkvenu povijest.
- SANU (1950). Posebna izdanja.
- Kudelić, Zlatko (2007). Marčanska biskupija: Habsburgovci, pravoslavlje i crkvena unija u Hrvatsko-slavonskoj vojnoj krajini (1611. - 1755). Hrvatski Inst. za Povijest. ISBN 978-953-6324-62-0.
- Kudelić, Zlatko (2010). "Čaplovičeva povijest Marčanske biskupije". Povijesni prilozi (38): 135–182.
- Ivić, Aleksa (1909). Seoba srba u hrvatsku i slavoniju: prilog ispitivanju srpske prošlodti tokom 16. i 17. veka. Sremski karlovci.
- arhiv, Croatia. Drzavni (1916). Vjesnik.
- Lamormain, Guillaume Germé de; Kerpchich, Andreas (1601). Disputatio philosophica quinquaginta thesibus comprehensa. Widmanstadt.
- štamparija (1922). Prilozi za književnost, jezik, istoriju i folklor. Drzhavna štamparija Kralevine srba, khrbata i slovent︠s︡a.
- Samardžić, Radovan (1981). Istorija srpskog naroda. Srpska knjiiževna zadruga.
- umjetnosti, Jugoslavenska akademija znanosti i (1906). Ljetopis Jugoslavenske akademije znanosti i umjetnosti. Jugoslovenska akademija znanosti i umjetnosti.
- Pavličević, Dragutin (1984). Vojna krajina: povijesni pregled, historiografija, rasprave. Sveučilišna naklada Liber.
- Petrić, Hrvoje (2006). "Katolička obnova i konfesionalne tolerancije". CCP (57): 55–63.
- Vukšić, Dragan (2015). Žumberački uskoci: unijaćenje i odnarođivanje. Zagreb: Srpsko narodno vijeće. ISBN 9789537442231.
