= Eparchy of Marča =

17th century religious entity

Eparchy of Marča Марчанска епархија Marčanska biskupija
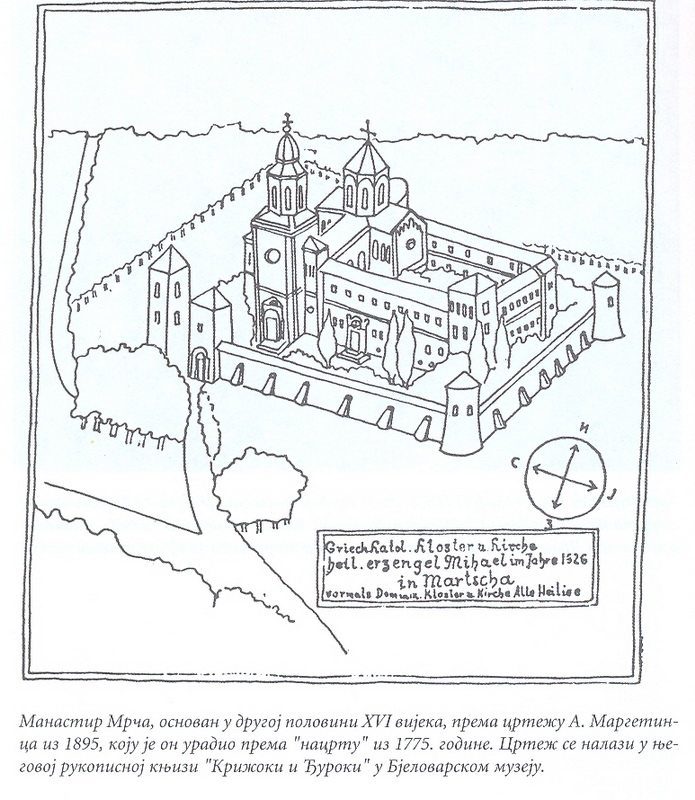
- The Marcha Monastery (1775)

Location
- Country: Habsburg monarchy
- Coordinates: 45°45′48″N 16°29′33″E

Statistics
- Members: 60,000–72,000

Information
- Rite: Byzantine
- Established: 21 November 1611
- Dissolved: 1753

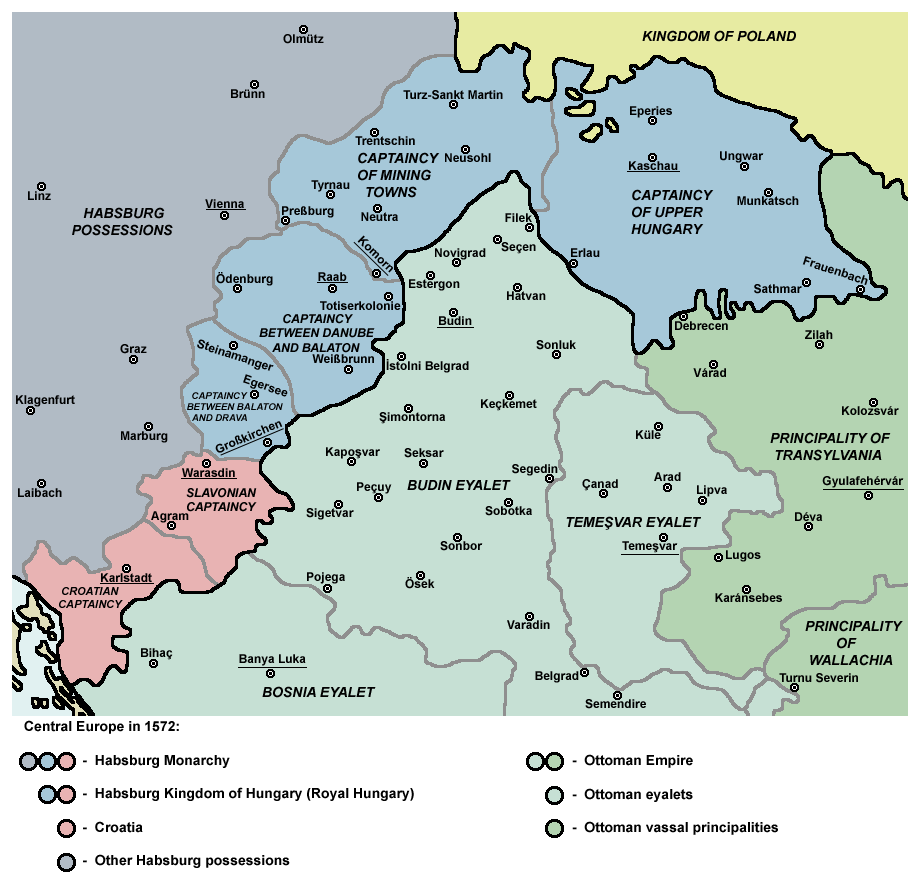
Turkish conquests, and remains of Hungarian Kingdom by 1572, including upper Slavonia and Croatia

The Eparchy of Marča (Serbian Cyrillic: Марчанска епархија, Croatian: Marčanska biskupija) was an Eastern Christian ecclesiastical entity taking two forms in the 17th century: an Eastern Orthodox eparchy and an Eastern Catholic vicariate. The term was derived from the name of the monastery at Marča (today Stara Marča) near Ivanić-Grad, Habsburg monarchy (present-day Zagreb County, Republic of Croatia).

Although Serbian Orthodox bishop Simeon Vratanja traveled to Rome in 1611 and formally accepted jurisdiction of the Pope over this bishopric, until 1670 Serb bishops continued to recognize the jurisdiction of the Serbian Patriarchate of Peć and struggled against conversion attempts by Roman Catholic bishops from Zagreb. This semi-union existed until the 1670 appointment of Pavle Zorčić as bishop. All Serb Orthodox clergy who objected to the union were arrested and sentenced to life in prison in Malta, where they died. The bishopric was succeeded by the Greek Catholic Eparchy of Križevci.

== Name ==
The name Marča was derived from the name of the nearby hill, Marča. Other names used for this bishopric include Svidnik (Svidnička eparhija), Vretanija (Vretanijska eparhija), and the "Uskok" (ускочка) bishopric.

== History ==
=== Early period ===
The Ottoman conquest of Serbia and Bosnia in 1459–63 led to massive migrations of Orthodox Christians, and by 1483 perhaps 200,000 Orthodox Christians moved into central Slavonia and Syrmia, and in the first half of the 16th century also settled western Croatia. Serbs migrated to Slavonia and Croatia proper throughout the 16th–18th centuries. In the first half of the 16th century Serbs settled Ottoman part of Slavonia while in the second part of the 16th century they moved to Austrian part of Slavonia. The Lepavina Monastery was founded in 1550. The immigrant Orthodox Christians of the Military Frontier were called "Vlachs", owing to their socio-economic and military status.

The Marča monastery was built by Orthodox priests at Marča near Ivanić-Grad dedicated to Saint Archangel Gabriel (Serbian: Манастир Светог Арханђела Гаврила) on the foundations (or near them) of the deserted and destroyed Catholic Monastery of All Saints. Some scholars put 1578 or 1597 as founding years, late 16th century or "before 1607". On St. Vitus Day 28 June 1609, Serbian Patriarch Jovan issued a synkellos naming Simeon vladika (bishop) of "the western lands, called Vratanija". This Simeon "Vretanja" or "Vratanja" was appointed the bishop of all Orthodox Serbs who settled Croatia.

Simeon's motives to subsequently accept Uniatism were based on the pressure of local Croat and Hungarian nobility and military command as well as Simeon's personal relations with the Catholic leadership in the Varaždin generalate and Catholic clergymen Martin Dubravić (a convert) and bishop of Zagreb Petar Domitrović. Uniatism was not supported by the Orthodox people, while it threatened the privileges held by the Orthodox frontiersmen who were freed of paying taxes that the majority of Catholics did. The strongest influence to Simeon's decision was Dubravić, who convinced him to recognize papal jurisdiction and to accept Eastern Catholicism. On 21 November 1611 Pope Paul V granted bishop Simeon Greek-Catholic episcopal authority in Croatia, Hungary, Slavonia and Žumberak, which was also confirmed by Archduke Ferdinand and Bishop of Zagreb Petar Petretić. It was expected that Simeon implement the unification of Orthodox "Vlachs" with the Catholic Church in the areas of the Croatian and Slavonian military frontiers. However, Simeon continued to use the Slavic language in liturgy, Eastern rite and Julian calendar, maintained connection with the Serbian Patriarchate of Peć and did not become a vicar to the Zagreb Diocese.

While Simeon Vretanja personally was loyal to Uniatism and the Pope, the nominal Papal subjugation and strategical maneuvering can be clearly seen in the tenure of Maksim Predojević. Predojević was obliged to get confirmation from Rome regarding his title and confirm Catholic faith to the Nuncio in Graz. Instead, Predojević returned to the Military Frontier and then went to the Serbian Patriarchate where he was confirmed as vladika. Predojević was a noted opponent to Uniatism and a protector of the rights and privileges of Orthodox Frontiersmen. A serious conflict between the Orthodox population and the Catholic Zagreb Diocese started with the appointment of Benedikt Vinković as bishop of Zagreb in 1637. Vinković wrote letters and complaints to the Congregation of Propaganda and the Austrian court accusing Predojević to be a "schismatic and heretic" (Orthodox) and asked for his seat to be replaced with a Catholic. Vinković's activities were aimed against Predojević when he refused to support the conversion of the population of his bishopric. Vinković had intention to depose Predojević and appoint Rafael Levaković instead.

In 1648 the Hungarian king appointed Sava Stanislavić as bishop of the Bishopric of Marča, as wished by the Slavonian Serbs, although Zagreb bishop Petretić proposed another candidate.

=== Period of union (1670–1753) ===
This kind of semi-union attitude of Serb bishops of Marča remained until 1670 and appointment of Pavle Zorčić. All priests of Marča who objected to the union were arrested in 1672 and imprisoned in Malta where they all died.

Until 19 November 1735, the Marča monastery was the seat of the Greek-Catholic bishops when the Orthodox Grenzers expelled the last three Greek-Catholic monks. Following the verdict of Vienna authorities and decision that the monastery belonged to the Greek Catholics, the Orthodox Grenzers burnt down Marča monastery on St. Vitus Day 28 June 1739. In 1754 around 17,000 Serb Orthodox Uskoks revolted in support of making Marča the seat of an Orthodox bishopric. Instead, the monastery was abandoned, as ordered by Empress Maria Theresa, and its treasury was looted.

The bishopric of Marča was eventually succeeded by the Eastern Catholic Eparchy of Križevci.

== Bishops ==
The bishops of the Eparchy of Marča were:

- Simeon Vratanja (1607–1629), titled "Rascian (Serb) bishop" (Rascianorum episcop)
- Maksim Predojević (1630–1642), titled "bishop of Vretanija" (episcopatus Vretaniensis)
- Gavrilo Predojević (1642–1644)
- Vasilije Predojević (1644–1648), titled "bishop of Vretanija Serbs" (episkop Srbljem vretaniskim)
- Sava Stanislavić (1648–1661), titled "bishop of Vretanija Serbs" (episkop Vretani Srbljem)
- Gabrijel Mijakić (1663–1670), titled "bishop of Serb sons" (episkup Srbski sinov)
- Pavao Zorčić (1671–1685)
- Marko Zorčić (1685–1688)
- Isaija Popović (1689–1699)
- Gabrijel Turčinović (1700–1707)
- Grgur Jugović (1707–1709)
- Rafael Marković (1710–1726)
- Georg Vučinić (1727–1733)
- Silvester Ivanović (1734–1735)
- Teofil Pašić (1738–1746)
- Gabrijel Palković (1751–1758)
- Vasilije Božičković (1759–1777)

== Sources ==
- Ćirković, Sima (2004). The Serbs. Malden: Blackwell Publishing. ISBN 9781405142915.
- Kolarić, Juraj (2002). Povijest kršćanstva u Hrvata: Katolička crkva. Hrvatski studiji Sveučilišta u Zagrebu. ISBN 978-953-6682-45-4.
- Kašić, Dušan Lj. (1967). "МАРЧАНСКА ЕПАРХИЈА". Srbi i pravoslavlje u Slavoniji i sjevernoj Hrvatskoj. Savez udruženja pravosl. sveštenstva SR Hrvatske.
- Kašić, Dušan Lj. (1988). Srpska naselja i crkve u sjevernoj Hrvatskoj i Slavoniji. Savez udruženja pravoslavnih sveštenika SR Hrvatske.
- Damjanović, Dragan; Roksandić, Drago; Maković, Zvonko (2005). Saborna crkva Vavedenja Presvete Bogorodice u Plaškom: povijest episkopalnog kompleksa. Srpsko Kulturno Društvo Prosvjeta. ISBN 978-953-6627-77-6.
- Medaković, Dejan (1971). Putevi srpskog baroka. Nolit.
- Ivić, Aleksa (1909). Seoba Srba u Hrvatsku i Slavoniju: prilog ispitivanju srpske prošlosti tokom 16. i 17. veka. Sremski Karlovci.
- Ivić, Aleksa (1923). "Марчанска епископија од Симеона Вретање до Гаврила Предојевића (1609-1642)". Браство. XVII.
- Jovičin, Miroslav (2025). "Срби и Римска курија I". Novi Sad: Културни центар Новог Сада.
- Kudelić, Zlatko (2002). Prvi marčanski grkokatolički biskup Simeon (1611–1630) (in Croatian). Zagreb: Hrvatski institut za povijest.
- Frucht, Richard C. (2005). Eastern Europe: An Introduction to the People, Lands, and Culture. ABC-CLIO. ISBN 978-1-57607-800-6.
- Sveti arhijerejski sinod (1972). Službeni list Srpske pravoslavne crkve. p. 55.
- Sveti arhijerejski sinod (2007). Glasnik. Vol. 89. p. 290.
- Popović, Dušan J., ed. (1934). Гласник Историског друштва у Новом Саду. Vol. 7. Историско друштво НР Србије.
- Žutić, Nikola (1997). Rimokatolička crkva i hrvatstvo: od ilirske ideje do velikohrvatske realizacije 1453-1941. Institut za savremenu istoriju.
