= Teodor Matsapula =

Ruthenian Greek Catholic bishop from Ukraine

Teodor Matsapula IVE
- Eparchial Bishop of Eparchy of Mukachevo
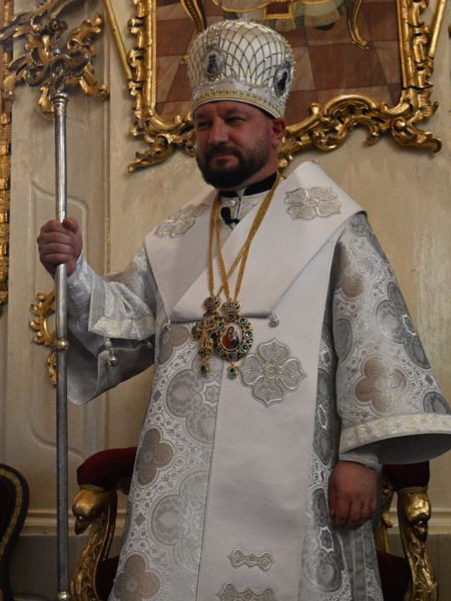
- Church: Ruthenian Greek Catholic Church
- Appointed: 8 May 2024
- Predecessor: Nil Lushchak (as Apostolic Administrator)
- Previous post: Provincial Superior of the Ukrainian Delegature of Institute of the Incarnate Word (2013–2019)

Orders
- Ordination: 10 February 2008 (Priest) by Volodymyr Viytyshyn
- Consecration: 16 July 2024 (Bishop) by Volodymyr Viytyshyn

Personal details
- Born: Andriy Yaremovych Matsapula; 21 August 1981 (age 45) Krylos, Ivano-Frankivsk Oblast, Ukrainian SSR
- Denomination: Ruthenian Greek Catholic
- Coat of arms

Bishop Teodor Andriy Matsapula IVE (Ukrainian: Теодор Андрій Мацапула; born 21 August 1981) is a Ukrainian Ruthenian Catholic hierarch, who serves as an Eparchial Bishop of the Greek Catholic Eparchy of Mukachevo since 8 May 2024.

== Early life and formation ==
Bishop Matsapula was born in a family of philology teachers in the village Krylos of Ivano-Frankivsk Oblast. He was clandestinely baptised in 1984 in the church in Yamnytsia, because of the religion persecutions. After graduation from the school education and discernment period, he joined the Institute of the Incarnate Word in 2001, continuing his studies at the International Seminary of San Vitaliano, in Segni, Italy, and at the San Bruno Vescovo Center for Higher Studies, where completed his philosophical and theological studies from 2002 until 2008. He had a profession on 23 October 2002 and a solemn profession on 25 August 2007, and was ordained as priest on 10 February 2008 by Bishop Volodymyr Viytyshyn.

== Pastoral career ==
From 2008 to 2013 Fr. Matsapula carried out pastoral service for the Catholic faithful of the Byzantine rite outside Ukraine. Upon returning to his homeland, he continued his ministry in the Eparchy of Mukachevo. From 2013 to 2019 he was a Provincial Superior of the then Delegation of the Mother of God of Zarvanytsia, in Ukraine. Since 2017 he has been Synkellos for the religious of the Greek-Catholic Eparchy of Mukachevo. In 2018 he obtained a baccalaureate in literature from the Vasyl Stefanyk Precarpathian National University in Ivano-Frankivsk and, in 2022, he obtained a licentiate degree in pastoral theology from the Ukrainian Catholic University in Lviv.

== Bishop ==
On 8 May 2024 he was appointed by Pope Francis as an Eparchial Bishop of the vacant Greek Catholic Eparchy of Mukachevo. He was consecrated as a bishop by Metropolitan of Ivano-Frankivsk Volodymyr Viytyshyn and co-consecrators: metropolitan Jonáš Maxim and bishop Nil Lushchak in the Holy Cross Cathedral in Uzhhorod on 16 July 2024.

Catholic Church titles
Preceded by Nil Lushchak (Apostolic Administrator)	Eparchial Bishop of Greek Catholic Eparchy of Mukachevo; 2024–	Succeeded by Incumbent
