= Eparchy of Mukachevo =

The term Eparchy of Mukachevo (also: Mukacheve, Mukačevo, Mukaczewo, Mukachiv, Munkács, Munkatsch) may refer to:

- Eastern Orthodox Eparchy of Mukachevo, former Eastern Orthodox diocese that existed until the Union of Uzhhorod in 17th century.
- Greek Catholic Eparchy of Mukachevo, current Eastern Catholic diocese that was formed after the Union of Uzhhorod.
- Eparchy of Mukachevo and Prešov, former Eastern Orthodox diocese that existed from 1931 to 1945, under ecclesiastical jurisdiction of the Serbian Orthodox Church.
- Eparchy of Mukachevo and Uzhhorod, modern Eastern Orthodox diocese that exists from 1945, under ecclesiastical jurisdiction of the Ukrainian Orthodox Church (Moscow Patriarchate).

== See also ==
- Mukachevo
- Roman Catholic Diocese of Mukachevo
- Czech and Slovak Orthodox Church
