= Yosyf Holovach =

Yosyf Holovach (Ukrainian: Йосиф Головач; 11 August 1924 – 18 June 2000) was a Ruthenian Greek Catholic hierarch. He was an auxiliary bishop of the Ruthenian Catholic Eparchy of Mukacheve from 1983 to 2000 as titular bishop of Sozopolis in Haemimonto (from 1991).

Born in Imstychovo, Czechoslovakia (present day – Ukraine) in 1924, he was ordained a priest on 14 September 1947 by Blessed Bishop Theodore Romzha for the Ruthenian Catholic Eparchy of Mukacheve. He served as married parish priest in village Yarok from 1947 to 1949, until the Communist regime abolished the Greek-Catholic Church. Fr. Holovach continued to serve in the time of persecutions and on 15 March 1983 was consecrated to the Episcopate as auxiliary bishop. The principal consecrator was clandestine bishop Alexander Chira. He was confirmed the auxiliary bishop by the Holy See and appointed as titular bishop of Sozopolis in Haemimonto on 16 January 1991.

He died in Uzhhorod on 18 June 2000.

Catholic Church titles
Preceded by Francis Carroll	Titular Bishop of Sozopolis in Haemimonto; 1991–2000	Succeeded by Stephan Ackermann
