= Milan Šašik =

Byzantine Catholic bishop (1952–2020)

His Excellency, The Most Reverend Milan Šašik C.M.
- Eparch of Mukachevo
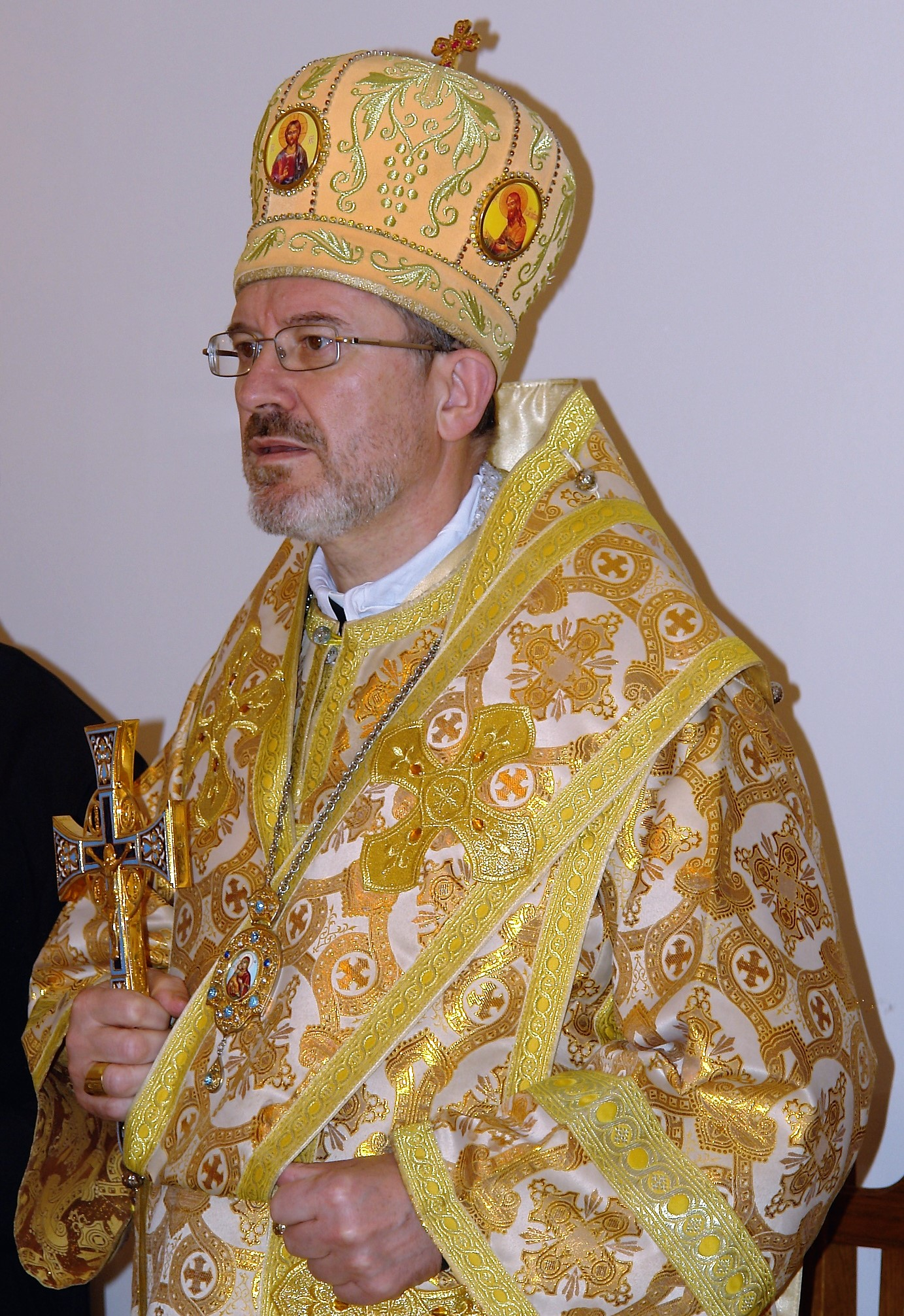
- Church: Ruthenian Greek Catholic Church
- Diocese: Eparchy of Mukachevo
- Appointed: 17 March 2010
- Term ended: 14 July 2020
- Predecessor: Ivan Semedi
- Successor: Nil Lushchak (Apostolic Administrator)
- Previous post: Apostolic administrator of Eparchy of Mukachevo (2002-2010)

Orders
- Ordination: 6 June 1976 (Priest) by Julius Gábriš
- Consecration: 6 January 2003 (Bishop) by Pope John Paul II

Personal details
- Born: 17 September 1952 Lehota, Czechoslovakia (present day Slovakia)
- Died: 14 July 2020 (aged 67) Uzhhorod, Ukraine
- Motto: Ambassador marry blahovѣstyty nyschymъ - sent me to preach to the poor
- Coat of arms

Milan Šašik, CM (17 September 1952 – 14 July 2020) was a Ruthenian Catholic hierarch from Slovakia who served as Bishop of the Eparchy of Mukachevo from 2010 until his death in 2020.

== Biography ==
He was born on 17 September 1952 in Lehota, Slovakia. After primary and secondary schools in 1971 - 1976, he was student rates philosophy and Theology in the Major Seminary in Bratislava.

On July 31, 1971 he entered the missionary Congregation of Lazarists, and on September 27, 1973 he made his perpetual vows.

On 6 June 1976 he was ordained a priest. Later, he served in a variety of pastoral work, was originally chaplain, then - the pastor. With permission from the Vatican, Fr. Milan Šašik served in two rites: the Byzantine and the Latin.

From 1990 to 1992, he studied at the Pontifical Institute of Spirituality "Teresianum" in Rome where he received a master's degree.

On October 5, 1992 to 7 July 1998, he worked at the Apostolic Nunciature in Ukraine. Then within a year he was director of the novitiate of the Congregation of the Lazarist Fathers in Slovakia. In August 2000 he returned to Ukraine and became a pastor in Perechyn, Transcarpathia.

On November 12, 2002, Pope John Paul II appointed Fr. Milan titular bishop of Bononia, Apostolic Administrator ad nutum Sanctae Sedis, Eparchy of Mukachevo Greek Catholic Church.

On 6 January 2003 in St. Peter's Basilica in Rome was his episcopal consecration.

He received Ukrainian citizenship in 2009 and the next year was appointed Eparchial Bishop of the same eparchy.

In addition to his native Slovak, he spoke Ukrainian, Italian, Czech, Russian and Polish. He was of Ruthenian ethnicity.

He died in 2020.
