= Ivan Margitych =

Ukrainian Greek Catholic bishop (1921–2003)

Ivan Margitych (Ukrainian: Іван Маргітич; 4 February 1921 – 7 September 2003) was a Ukrainian Greek Catholic hierarch. He was an auxiliary bishop of the Ruthenian Catholic Eparchy of Mukacheve from 1987 to 2002 and titular bishop of Scopelus in Haemimonto from 1991 to 2003.

Born in Velyka Chynhava, Czechoslovakia (present day – Borzhavske, Ukraine) in 1921 in the peasant family of Anton Margitych and Tereza (née Kostak), he was ordained a priest on 18 August 1946 by Blessed Bishop Theodore Romzha for the Ruthenian Catholic Eparchy of Mukacheve. He served as parish priest in Rakhiv from 1946 to 1949, until the Communist regime abolished the Greek-Catholic Church. Fr. Margitych continued to serve in the time of persecutions and in 1951 was arrested by Communists and imprisoned in Gulag. Released from prison continued to work as clandestine priest and on 10 September 1987 was consecrated to the Episcopate as auxiliary bishop. The principal consecrator was clandestine bishop Sofron Dmyterko. He was confirmed the auxiliary bishop by the Holy See and appointed as titular bishop of Scopelus in Haemimonto on 16 January 1991. Retired on 12 November 2002.

He died in Pylypets, Zakarpattia Oblast on 7 September 2003 while celebrated the Divine Liturgy.

Catholic Church titles
Preceded by none	Titular Bishop of Scopelus in Haemimonto; 1991–2003	Succeeded by vacant
