= Saint Nicholas Monastery, Mukachevo =

Eastern Orthodox monastery in Mukachevo, Ukraine

Saint Nicholas Monastery
- Миколаївський Мукачівський жіночий монастир
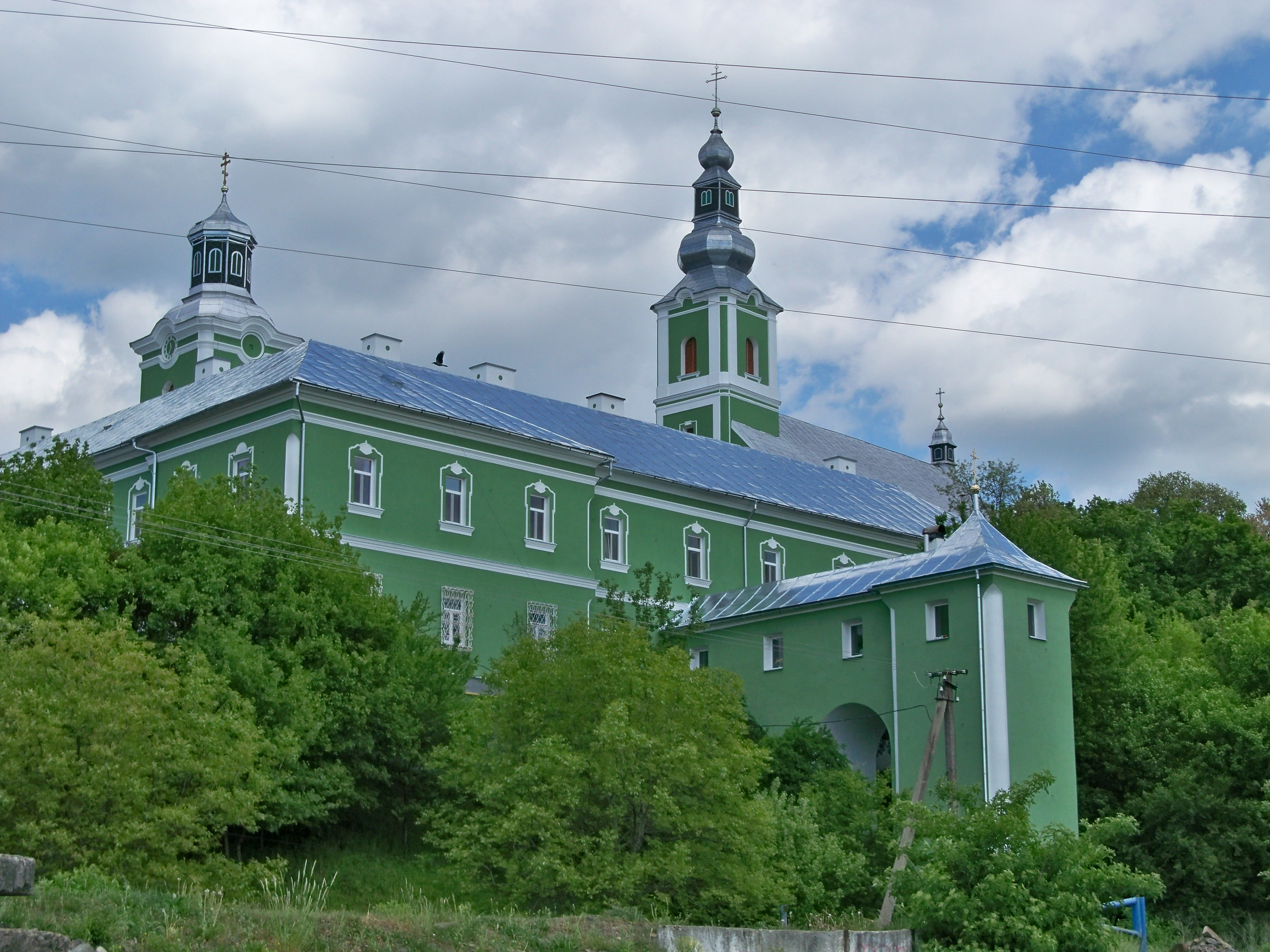

- Location within Zakarpattia Oblast Location within Ukraine
- Interactive map of Saint Nicholas Monastery

Monastery information
- Denomination: Ukrainian Orthodox Church (Moscow Patriarchate)

Site
- Location: Pidmonastyr, Mukachevo
- Country: Ukraine
- Coordinates: 48°27′18″N 22°44′01″E

The Saint Nicholas Monastery (Ukrainian: Миколаївський Мукачівський жіночий монастир, romanized: Mykolaivskyi Mukachivskyi zhinochnyi monastyr is an Eastern Orthodox monastery located on Chernecha Hora (monk's hill) in Mukachevo, Ukraine. It belongs to the jurisdiction of Eparchy of Mukachevo and Uzhhorod of the Ukrainian Orthodox Church (Moscow Patriarchate). It is a female monastery, headed by hegumenia Epistimiya Sherban.

== History ==
The exact date of its founding is unknown, though some believe it was founded in the late 11th century. In the 14th century the monastery was under the patronage of Fedir Koriiatovych. In 1491 it was made the seat of the Eastern Orthodox Eparchy of Mukachevo that had jurisdiction was the whole of Transcarpathia. In 1537, the monastery was burned during war though it was rebuilt soon after with permission of Emperor Ferdinand I. After the Union of Uzhhorod in 1646, the monastery joined the Greek Catholic Basilian monastic order. From then on the archimandrite was also the superior general of the order in Transcarpathia. The bishop's residence was transferred to Mukachiv in 1751, but the monastery remained the administrative center for the Basilians. During the years 1798–1804 the Saint Nicholas Church was constructed in a Classicist style. In 1862 much of it was again destroyed by fire, but rebuilt within three years.

The monastery ran a school and library which became important to the cultural and religious life of the region. It also maintained contacts with the Eastern Orthodox of the Balkans and eastern Europe. Hegumen Anatol Kralytsky was a prominent Transcarpathian writer in the 19th century.

In the 1920s, the monastery was restructured and reforms were introduced by Basilian monks from Galicia. In 1946 the Soviet regime liquidated the Ruthenian Greek Catholic Church, and the monastery was forced to become Eastern Orthodox. All of the monks refused to convert and were exiled. The collection of over 6,000 rare books and manuscripts and its archives were transferred to local museums and archives. The monastery was transformed into a convent for Orthodox nuns from other monasteries that were closed by the Soviets. At present there are about seventy Orthodox nuns housed in the monastery.

== See also ==
- Eparchy of Mukačevo and Prešov
