= Petro Oros =

Auxiliary eparch and Ukrainian martyr

Blessed Petro Pavlo Oros
- Auxilary Bishop of Mukacheve; Martyr
- Native name: Петро Павло Орос
- Church: Ruthenian Greek Catholic
- Diocese: Mukachevo
- Installed: 19 December 1944
- Term ended: 27 August 1953

Orders
- Ordination: 26 June 1942 by Oleksandr Stoyka
- Consecration: 19 December 1944 by Theodore Romzha

Personal details
- Born: 14 July 1917 Biri, Austro-Hungarian Empire
- Died: 27 August 1953 (aged 36) Siltse, Irshava raion, Ukrainian SSR, Soviet Union
- Denomination: Greek Catholic

Sainthood
- Feast day: 27 August
- Venerated in: Ruthenian Greek Catholic Church
- Beatified: 27 September 2025; Bilky, Ukraine by Cardinal Grzegorz Ryś

Petro Pavlo Oros (Ukrainian: Петро Павло Орос, Hungarian: Orosz Péter Pál; 14 July 1917 – 27 August 1953) was a Greek Catholic Eparchy of Mukachevo hierarch after the Church was suppressed by the communist regime. He was an auxiliary bishop of the Ruthenian Catholic Eparchy of Mukacheve from 1944 to 1953, when he was murdered by an anti-faith police officer.

He is a martyr of the Catholic Church. His beatification was approved in August 2022, and after several delays he was beatified in September 2025.

== Early life ==
Born in Biri, Austria-Hungary Empire (present day – Hungary) in 1917 in the family of a Greek-Catholic priest. His father died when Petro was 2 years old and his mother died when he was age 9. He studied for the Holy Priesthood in the Theological Seminary of Uzhhorod from 1937 to 1942 and was ordained a priest on 26 June 1942 for the Greek Catholic Eparchy of Mukachevo. Oros served a number of villages in the Eparchy of Mukachevo as the parish vice-priest. On 19 December 1944 he was clandestinely consecrated to the Episcopate as auxiliary bishop. The principal and single consecrator was blessed bishop Theodore Romzha.

In 1944 the region of Transcarpathia was captured by the Red Army and annexed to the Ukrainian Soviet Socialist Republic. The Soviet government began suppressing the Greek-Catholics, pressuring them to become Eastern Orthodox, but Oros resisted and remained faithful to the pope. In 1949, after the church was ordered to close by the government, Oros continued to serve the local community in the Irshava raion clandestinely. He was shot by a communist police officer in Siltse, Irshava raion, Zakarpattia Oblast after celebration of the Divine Liturgy on 27 August 1953.

== Beatification ==
The martyrdom of Oros was recognized by Pope Francis on 5 August 2022. He was to be beatified on the third of May 2025, but with the death of Pope Francis the beatification was put on hold. His beatification was on 27 September at Bilky, Ukraine, by the papal representative, Cardinal Grzegorz Ryś, and it was also recalled by Pope Leo XIV on the same day at St. Peter's Square. His feast day was set on 27 August, the day, when Oros was martyred.
