= Chernecha Hora =

Chernecha Hora literally meaning Monks' Hill in Ukrainian, may refer to:

- Taras Hill, a hill near Kaniv, Ukraine
- Chernecha Hora Street, Lviv, Ukraine
- Chernecha Hora, Mukachevo, Ukraine
