= Petro Parfenii =

Orthodox bishop of Mukachevo (died 1665)

Petro Parfenii Petrovich O.S.B.M.
- Eparch of Mukachevo
- Native name: Петро Парфеній
- Church: Ruthenian Greek Catholic Church
- Diocese: Eparchy of Mukachevo
- In office: 1652 – 1665
- Predecessor: Eparchy erected
- Successor: Josyf Volosynovskyj

Orders
- Consecration: 1652

Personal details
- Died: 1655

Petro Parfenii Petrovich was an Orthodox bishop and a Basilian monk who united the Ruthenian Church with Rome.

== Biography ==
On 24 April 1646, 63 Ruthenian priests (under Parfenii's and eparch Vasyl Tarasovych leadership) solicited and performed a union with the Catholic Church. However, they required the preservation of the Byzantine Rite, Canon law and the ecclesiastical authority, based on the principles of Orthodox governance (an independent choice of the bishops). Parfenii after the Union of Uzhhorod of the Greek Catholic Eparchy of Mukachevo became its first eparch (1651 - 1665).

On 15 January 1652, Petro Parfenii personally handed over to Rome the protocol on the conclusion of Union oh Uzhhorod of 1646. The Catholic Church recognized Parfenii as bishop in 1655 (due to Parfenii's ordination by an Orthodox metropolitan in 1651). In 1664, Parfenii established himself in Mukacheve. Parfenii died in 1665.

== Historical facts ==
On 14 May 1648 Archbishop of Esztergom György Lippay assured the Ukrainian clergy of the Shariish, Zemplinsky and Uzhansky Committees connected with the Roman Church that it would have church immunity (protection). The bishopric's custody of the higher Catholic circles of Hungary dates back to 1651 when the Transylvanian Orthodox Archbishop of Dulofegirvar (now Alba Julia in Romania) Stefan Shimonovich (1643-1654), together with Moldavian Gregory and Bystrytsky Savva, was ordained to the Mukachevo eparch of the united monk of Petro Parfenii (Petrovich), as explained. E.-Kr. Suttner, in order "to save the union, and thereby guarantee to the Eastern Church local the support of the Catholics to counter Calvinists."

=== Confirmation of the chirotony ===
The then primate of the Catholic Church of Hungary, the Archbishop of Esztergom György Lippai, considered the ordination of a Uniate priest to be a non-Russian metropolitan in the given circumstances, and on 5 September that year appointed bishop Partenii as the visiting agent for all Greek Catholics residing in Hungary. Lippai stood up for the newly-ordained ruler in Rome with a petition to be released from all church punishments, and assured that the hierarch, who committed the consecration, knew about the Uniate origin of the candidate. Archbishop Shimonovich himself, having given the consecration, testified in the letter of the proclamation issued by Peter Partenius on the ordination, that the basis for the ordination was the candidate's document confirming that the Hungarian primate had entrusted him a pastoral service among the Rusyns in Upper Hungary. Pope Alexander VII on 8 June 1655 instructed Lippay to endorse Parfenii in the bishopric and frees him from punishment. The Pope's order was fulfilled by Lippai on 22 July that year. The King of Hungary and the Austrian emperor Leopold I, on the basis of his right to patronage on 23 October 1659, assigned Parfenii as eparch of Mukachevo.

Among the 24 documents published in the work of the researcher A. Godinka about the activities of Petro Parfenii was the meeting of the Congregation for the Propagation of the Faith on 2 October 1651, in what Cardinal Trivulzio reported that the Archbishop of Estergom had requested the founding of a bishopric for the Hungarian Rusyns. After that, the Cardinal decided to turn to the Pope. On seven issues of the Congregation for the Propagation of the Faith on 2 July 1654, the Archbishop of Esztergom György Lippai sent a detailed report to Rome, which became the first, albeit the general, official written document on the then Church position of the Rusyns. In its content it is worthwhile to stay in more detail.

It follows from this that "nobody was worried, nobody protected the interests of the Rusyns as schismatics", which there are more than 200 thousand souls of the Greek rite in the territory of Spizh to Maramorosh (along 70 miles). For them, religious practices are conducted by about 600 priests who do not speak the Latin language. In addition to them, 24 more are on the territory of the Eger and its bishopric, and 45 on the territory of the Spassky Committee, which belongs to the Metropolitan of Esztergom. All of these unconnected priests, from time immemorial, had their bishop in Mukachevo. The work of converting these schismatics to the Catholic Church through the adoption of the union was begun by the Egerian bishops György Lippai and György Yakushech who, with the help of the already united Basilian monks, Peter Partenius and Gavril Kosovich (Kosovitsky), first turned 63 into the Union, and shortly thereafter 400 altar brothers. Mukachevo eparchy is composed by Humenna, Uzhhorod and Makovitsa, that is, composed by the priests of the Spishsky, Shariish, Zemplinsky and Uzhansky Comitates.

=== Issues of jurisdiction ===
During the presentation of information to the Congregation for the Propagation of the Faith of the Catholic Church's hometown in Hungary, the issue of the jurisdiction of the Mukachevo eparch and the episcopate also applies. In his view, recent schismatics had their episcopate of the Greek rite, which was not dependent on either the Bishop of Eger, or the Archbishop of Estergom. The Bishop of Mukachevo of the Greek rite can not be subordinated to the Eparchian Latin Bishop, since one bishop is independent of the other. Therefore, the Archbishop of Esztergom tried to ensure that all the schismatics of Hungary, Rusyns and Volks, who have their priests of the Greek rite on the territory of the Estergom and Yavrinskaya (apparently Egersky - VF) dioceses subordinated themselves to the bishop Parfenii's authority, "and the bishop himself was subordinated, as if his Metropolitan or Primate, to ter Archbishop of Esztergom".

After Perro Parfenii returned to unity with the Catholic Church, he became the first Uniate bishop, who in 1659 Emperor Leopold I, using his royal right of patronage (iuris patronatus), officially called eparch of Mukachevo. In opposition to the intentions of the primate of Lippai, the owner of the Mukachevo castle, Sofia Batory, became the owner of the Catholic Church after the death of her husband, the Protestant prince Dordoi II of Rakhodia in 1660. For protection, the envelope appealed to the Metropolitan of Kiev, through his Jesuit confessor about. At the end of 1662, the Princess asked Stefan Milly for the Kyivan Uniate Metropolitan Gabriel Kolenda (1655-1674) to ordain and send a bishop to Mukachevo.

At the synod of the Metropolitanate of Kyiv in Zhivortsy in 1663, it was decided to ordain an eparch to the eparch of Mukachevo, but with the condition that the given diocese would be subordinated to the metropolitan. When Sofia Batory found out that with the official appeal to Rome about subordination of the Mukachevo diocese to the Kyivan Metropolitanate, the Synod sent Bishop of Kholm to Yakov Sushu (1652-1687), she changed her mind. Considering that the Mukachevo's eparch should belong to the metropolitan jurisdiction of the Archbishop of Esztergom, and the subordination to Kiev was not raised, in the summer of 1664 Sofia Bator called for the Uniate Bishop of Parfenii establish himself in Mukachevo.

Meanwhile, three-year effort to persuade the Holy See to subordinate the eparchy of Mukachevo to the jurisdiction of the Kyiv Metropolitanate was not successful.

=== Changes after the death of the bishop ===
After the Parfenii's death, an eparch who enjoyed the respect of the masses, the time has come to weaken the episcopal authorities. During the 60's and 80's of the XVII Ventura, bishops were eight people - immigrants from Galicia, Serbia and Subcarpathian Rus. Often there were disputes over religious and economic issues, and nobody was interested in the life of the clergy and the position of the faithful. The cause of the union fell. The center of the confrontation was Maramoroshchyna. Clergy and laymen of the eastern regions of Transcarpathia have long been victims of this struggle for power.
