= Greek Catholic Eparchy of Mukachevo =

Greek Catholic eparchy in Ukraine

Coordinates: 48.6232°N 22.3022°E

Greek Catholic Eparchy of Mukachevo Eparchia Munkacsiensis

Location
- Country: Ukraine

Statistics
- Population: Total: (as of 2010); 380,000
- Parishes: 471

Information
- Denomination: Catholic Church (Eastern Catholic)
- Sui iuris church: Ruthenian Greek Catholic Church
- Rite: Byzantine Rite
- Established: September 19, 1771
- Cathedral: Holy Cross Cathedral
- Patron: Theodore Romzha
- Secular priests: 261

Current leadership
- Pope: Leo XIV
- Bishop: Teodor Matsapula
- Auxiliary Bishops: Nil Lushchak

Map

Website
- www.mgce.uz.ua

The Greek Catholic Eparchy of Mukachevo is an eparchy of the Ruthenian Greek Catholic Church that was erected by Pope Clement XIV in 1771. The geographic remit of the eparchy includes the south-western parts of Ukraine that are roughly within Zakarpattia Oblast. The eparchy is directly subject to the Holy See. It is supervised by the Dicastery for the Eastern Churches. Its parishes observe the Byzantine Rite, which is also celebrated by the majority of Orthodox Christians, as provided for in the original terms of the Union of Uzhhorod. The episcopal seat is the Cathedral of the Exaltation of the Holy Cross in Uzhhorod.

Mukachevo is the mother eparchy of four modern Eastern Catholic churches: the Slovak Greek Catholic Church, the Romanian Greek Catholic Church, the Hungarian Greek Catholic Church, and the Ruthenian Greek Catholic Church.

== History ==
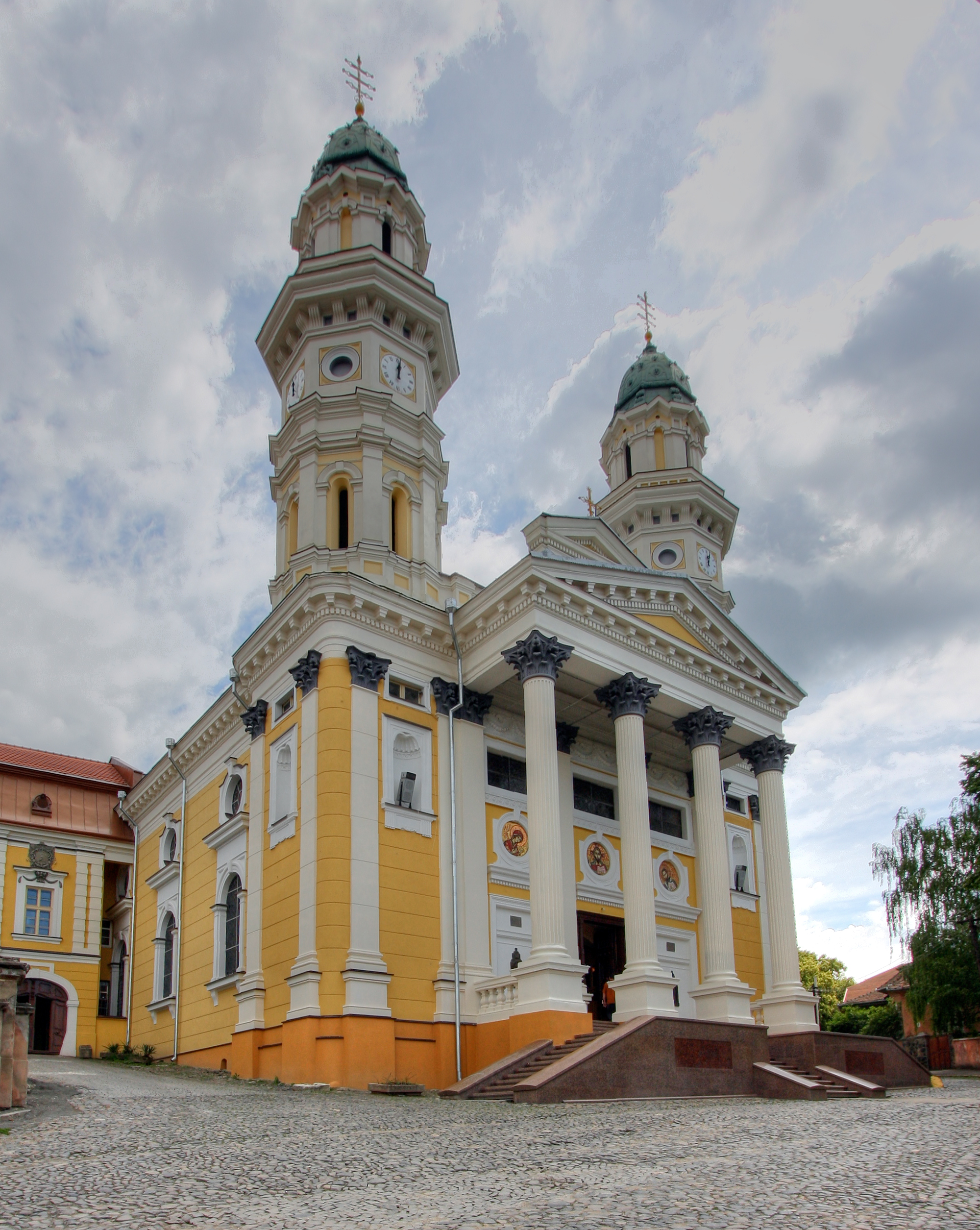
Cathedral of the Exaltation of the Holy Cross, Uzhhorod

Some historians believe that the origins of the eparchy are to be found in the missionary work of Saints Cyril and Methodius in the ninth century. The 14th century saw the founding of the Saint Nicholas Monastery on Chernecha Hora (Hill of Monks) located in the city of Mukachevo. Many believe that from that point, the Eparchy of Mukachevo evolved into the entity as we know it today. The bishops resided at the Monastery and administered ecclesiastical affairs from there until 1766. After the union with Rome and until 1946, the Monastery of St Nicholas was also the principal religious house of the monks of the Order of Saint Basil the Great (OSBM), also called Basilian monks.

The bishops, clergy and faithful of this eparchy were originally Orthodox Christians who at some point were reconstituted under an eparchy suffragan to the original Metropolitan of Kiev (Russian Orthodox Church) that was under the jurisdiction of the Patriarch of Constantinople (see Eparchy of Mukačevo and Prešov).

In 1646, following the example of their compatriots across the Carpathian Mountains in Galicia (current day Western Ukraine), who in 1596 established the Union of Brest, the people of the Mukachevo eparchy united with the papal Holy See (recognizing the primacy of Catholic Rome, not Byzantine, Orthodox 'New Rome' Constantinople) under what is known as the Union of Uzhhorod. Other Eastern Orthodox Christians who belonged to the original Eastern Orthodox eparchy of Mukachevo and refused to convert joined the eparchy of Buda that is suffragan to the Serbian Patriarchate of Peć (and later Patriarchate of Karlovci).

In the political and spiritual climate of the day, union with Rome was considered by many to be a productive solution to promoting both the welfare of the people and the church. Following a model similar to that proposed at the Council of Florence, the people were allowed to maintain their Byzantine Rite spiritual, liturgical and canonical traditions, while recognizing the Roman Pontiff as the head of the universal church. From 1646 to 1771 the eparchy was suffragan to the Roman Catholic Archdiocese of Eger.

On September 19, 1771, after decades of efforts on the part of the bishops of Mukachevo for recognition as a fully self-governing ecclesiastical entity, free from the control of the Latin Catholic bishops of Eger (today in Hungary), the Habsburg Holy Roman Empress Maria Theresa issued a decree, subsequently approved by Rome, that created a jurisdictionally independent Mukachevo Eparchy no longer subordinate to the Latin Church ordinary. It was also at this time that the faithful of the eparchy formally became known as Greek Catholics. During the episcopate of Bishop Andrii Bachynskyij (1772-1809), the eparchy retained its historic name but its seat was moved to Uzhhorod (1780), where it remains to this day.

Following the Second World War and the occupation of Carpatho-Ukraine by the Soviet regime, the Greek Catholic Church was liquidated in 1949. All properties were allocated to the Russian Orthodox Church and the clergy and many faithful exiled to concentration camps. The bishop of Mukachevo during this time was Theodore Romzha. In 1947, Bishop Romzha was poisoned by NKVD (predecessor of the KGB) authorities. During the Soviet years, the Greek Catholic Church in Galicia, Transcarpathia and Slovakia continued to operate secretly in the underground.

== Structure ==
With the collapse of the Soviet Union, many priests and faithful of the Eparchy of Mukachevo came out of the catacombs. The eparchy was allowed to officially renew its activities in 1989. Bishop Ivan Semedi, who had been secretly consecrated during the persecution years, was the first bishop to freely perform his ministry in over 40 years.

In 2014 the eparchy had 320,000 faithful, 2 bishops, 429 parishes, 280 diocesan priests, 30 religious priests, 44 men religious, 45 women religious, 0 deacons and 98 seminarians.

== List of Bishops ==
The list of the eparchs (bishops) of the Greek Catholic Eparchy of Mukachevo is:

=== Eastern Orthodox bishops ===
- Hierotheos, 940
- Lucas the presbyter, 1445-1490
- Joannes I, 1491-1498
- Basilius I, 1551-1552
- Hilarius I, 1556-1559
- Euthymius I, 1561-1567
- Amphilochius, 1569-1596
- Basilius II, 1597-inc.
- Sergius, 1601-1616
- Sophronius I, 1616
- Hilarius II
- Euthymius II, 1618-inc.
- Petronius, 1623-1627
- Joannes II (Hrehorovych), 1627-1633
- Basilius III (Tarasovych), 1634-1642
- Porphyry (Arden), 1640—1643
- Sophronius II (Yusko), 1646 (Vlach)
- Basilius III (Tarasovych), 1646-1648
- Parfeniy (Petrovych-Ratoszynski), 1648—1649
- Joannicius (Zeikan), 1652—1686
- Theophanes (Mavrokordato), 1677 (Archbishop of Hungarian Ruthenia)
- Methodius (Rakovecki), 1687—1692
- Joseph (Stojka), 1692—1711
- Dosyteus (Feodorovych), 1711—1734

=== Greek Catholic bishops ===
- after the 1646 Union of Uzhhorod the Eparchy of Mukachevo united with Rome

- Vasyl Tarasovych, 1646-1648
- Petro Parfenii, 1649-1665
- Yosyf Voloshynovskyi, 1670-1673
- Porphyriy Kulchynskyi, 1681-1686
- Yosyf de Kamelis (Joseph de Camillis), 1690-1706
- Yosyf Hodermarskyi, 1706-1716
- Hennadiy Bizantsiy, 1716-1733
- Stefan Olshavskyi, 1733-1737
- Havryil Blazhovskyi, 1738–1742
- Manuil Olshavskyi, 1743–1767
- Ivan Bradach, 1767–1771
  - In 1771 the Eparchy of Mukachevo got his independence from the Latin bishop of Eger
- Ivan Bradach, 1771–1772
- Andriy Bachynskyi, 1773–1809
  - auxiliary bishop Mykhaylo Bradach, 1808–1812
- Mykhaylo Bradach, Apostolic Administrator, 1812–1815
- Oleksiy Povchiy, 1816–1831
- Vasyl Popovych, 1837–1864
- Stefan Pankovych, 1866–1874
- Ivan Pasteliy, 1876–1891
- Yuliy Firtsak, 1891–1912
  - coadjutor bishop Antal Papp, 1912
- Antal Papp, 1912–1924
- Petro Gebey, 1924–1931
- Oleksandr Stoyka, 1932–1943
- Miklós Dudás, Apostolic Administrator, 1943–1946
- Bl. Teodor Romzha, 1944–1947
  - In 1949 the Communist Ukrainian Soviet Socialist Republic abolished the Greek Catholic Church; all its properties were allocated to the Russian Orthodox Church.
- Clandestine Bishops
  - Alexander Chira, 1944–1983
  - Petro Oros, 1944–1953
  - Konstantyn Sabov, 1977–1982
  - Ivan Semedi, 1978–1991
  - Yosyf Holovach, 1983–1991
  - Ivan Margitych, 1987–1991
  - In 16 January 1991 the Holy See confirmed all clandestine consecrations
- Ivan Semedi, 1991-2002
  - auxiliary bishop Yosyf Holovach, 1991–2000
  - auxiliary bishop Ivan Margitych, 1991–2002
  - auxiliary bishop Đura Džudžar, 2001–2003
- Milan Šašik, Apostolic Administrator, 2002–2010
- Milan Šašik, 2010–2020
  - auxiliary bishop Nil Lushchak, since 2012
- Nil Lushchak, Apostolic Administrator, 2020–2024
- Teodor Matsapula, since 2024

== See also ==
- Eparchy of Mukačevo and Prešov

== Sources and external links ==
- Official site
- GigaCatholic
- The Hierarchy of the Catholic Church
