= Vasyl Tarasovych =

Vasyl Tarasovych (??? - 1651 ) was a church figure in Transcarpathia, Basilian, eparch of Mukachevo (1634 - 1651) and the initiator of the union with the Catholic Church in Transcarpathia.

Vasyl Tarasovich was bishop of the Mukachevo eparchy since 1634, and was the first Ruthenian Catholic bishop of Mukachevo since 24 April 1646, when Union of Uzhhorod was proclaimed until his death in 1651.

== Biography ==
=== Persecution and Unity ===
The persecuted prince George I Rákóczi was forced to leave his lands and in 1642, after having put them on the hands of the apostolic nuncio of the Catholic faith, he settled in Kallow. There, the rebels of Rakotsiya um 1643 seized Tarasovich and dragged him to Mukachevo.

In order to save the diocese from Protestants, Tarasovich again assumed the throne of the leadership in Mukachevo.

On 24 April 1646, in the church-chapel of Uzhhorod Castle, by the initiative of Vasyl Tarasovych, although he was not permitted to participate in the 1646 sobor, 63 priests showed the unity of the Catholic Church (concluded in the Union of Uzhhorod). In 1663, the conditions in what the Mukachevo eparchy could be included in the Kyiv metropolitanate were determined. However, because of the resistance of George II Rákóczi's widow, the Mukachevo eparchy obeyed to the Hungarian Bishop of Eger.

In these circumstances, Vasyl Tarasovych created the prerequisites for his successor, Petro Parfenii, who became the first Greek Catholic bishop of Mukachevo.

=== Prehistory ===
In 1623, after 23 years of exile, Bishop Petronius appeared in Mukachevo, whom Transylvanian Prince Gabor Bethelen appointed "Bishop of Berezky, Uzhansky, Sabolsky, Zemplinsky, Maramoroshsky, and Sharishkomitatsiy of the Greek Catholic Church. The letter from G. Belen on 10 February that year is the first document in the history of the Mukachevo Eparchy, which lists the territory under the committees belonging to the jurisdiction of the Mukachevo Eparchy. The jurisdiction of his successor - Ivan Gregorovych (1627-1633) extended to the same flock. The new eparch (the first of the Mukachevo eparchs who owned the Latin language) was closely associated with the Greek Catholic Metropolitan Josyf Veliamyn Rutsky, whom he personally met when returning from Jass, where he received a chiropony in early February 1628, and Rutsky wrote about it in his report to Rome on 28 June that year. Stating that "He is also with us, though not yet perfectly". The Greek Catholic Metropolitan of Kyiv did not question the canonical nature of the ordination of the "Mukachevo eparch of the Greek Rite of Madaria" belonging to the Metropolitanate of Wallachia and Moldavia.

His successor was Ivan Gregorovych and after him, Vasyl Tarasovich, and although he was born in Galicia, his consecration was on 6 December 1633, as well as all his predecessors, since 1597 receiving their consecrations from the Moldavian Metropolitan in Iasi.

Of all the documents mentioning the name of Mukachevo Eparch Vasyl Tarasovych (published by A.Godinka), the letter drawn by the Bishop of Eger György Lippay (Regensburg, 15 March 1641) to the Cardinal of the Congregation for the Evangelization of Peoples in Rome was drawn to attention. It states that as a result of his two-year activity, the intention was "to live in the territory of the episcopate of the united Russian Patriarch in connection ...". In addition to the news about the "Russian Patriarch", the letter was not formulated about the new issue of the jurisdiction of the eparch of Mukachevo to the canonical territory of the diocese of Eger.

It soon became clear that it was a question of the Eparch of Mukachevo Vasyl Tarasovych, who was in conflict with the diocese of Eger (thus, in the early 1640s, Roman leaders from the Congregation for the Evangelization of Peoples, Cardinals Palotto, Shpad and Brantsati, were informed not only of the recognition of the Catholic symbol of faith by the Mukachevo eparchs of the Eastern rite, but also of this eparchy, and in 1643 10 counties (Berezkoye, Uzhansky, Sabolchsky, Ugochansky, Satmarsky, Maramoroshsky, Zemplinsky, Sharyshsky, Spishsky and Abauivarsky) were placed on the canonical territory of the Latin bishop of Eger. In the second half of the XVI - the first half of the XVII century, the Calvinist princes of Transylvania, who sought to create a strong Protestant state, also reigned over much of Upper Hungary, including the Mukachevo castle and the residence of the Mukachevo bishops in the monastery on Chernecha mountain, they set out to bring the eastern Christians of the lands under their jurisdiction to Calvinism and after that give them Hungarian language. In order to better resist the onslaught of Protestant princes converted again to Calvinism, with the support of the primate of the Roman Catholic Church in Hungary, Petra Pazman, in order to preserve their influence, they offered themselves to unite with the Catholic Church.

Believers, led by bishops from the monastery of St. Nicholas near Mukachevo, although they did not speak the same language and obeyed the political elite belonging to the Latin Church, were united by a common ecclesiastical tradition and, in church and culture terms, were under the spiritual influence of the "Kyivan Church." As a result of the cooperation of the Catholic circles of Hungary (the union in Uzhhorod was concluded with the permission of the gentry of Gordy Lippay with the Latin bishop Eger Gyorde Yakushich) and the Basilian monks Peter Parfenii and Gabriel Kosovyshch, after 1646 the question of the metropolitan's subordination of the Bishops of Mukachevo became more acute. His problematic was complicated by the fact that there were no documents, such as the establishment of the Mukachevo bishopric, as well as on the jurisdictional subordination of one of the closest to the Mukachevo metropolitans.

In the times of Tarasovych to the traditional six committees, which were subject to the episcopal jurisdiction of the Mukachevo rulers (Bereg, Ung, Sabolch, Zemplin, Maramorosh, and Sharish), in 1635, Ugoch and Satmar were added, and in 1643 two more - Spesh and Abaui. Altogether there lived about 160,000 believers. Particular attention deserves the fact that at the diocesan council, which took place in the settlement of the Kiraletlek (near Niriqiqi) in 1638, the archdeacon of the Zatyansky district of Janos Marinych was simultaneously appointed "vicar for the Magic speakers of the Greek rite". On 14 May 1648 the Archbishop of Estergom György Lippay assured the Russian cleric of the Shariish, Zemplinsky and Uzhansky Committees connected with the Roman Church that it would have church immunity (protection). The bishopric's custody of the higher Catholic circles of Hungary dates back to 1651, when the Transylvanian Orthodox Archbishop of Dulofegirvar (now Alba Yuliya in Romania), Stefan Shimonovich (1643-1654), together with Moldavian Gregory and Bystrytsky Savva, ordained the patron saint of the Mukachevo diocese of the Greek Catholic monk Peter Parfenii (Petrovich), as Fr. E.-Kr. Suttner, in order "to save the union, and thereby guarantee the local Eastern Church the support of the Catholics to counter calvinists."

== See also ==
- Greek Catholic Eparchy of Mukachevo
- Union of Uzhhorod

== Sources ==
- Encyclopedia of Ukrainian Studies / Dictionary part: [in 11 vols] / Shevchenko Scientific Society / Goal. Ed. Prof. Dr. Volodymyr Kubiyovych - Paris; New York: Young Life; Lviv; Kyiv: Globus, 1955-2003

== Literature ==
- http://www.irbis-nbuv.gov.ua/cgi-bin/irbis_nbuv/cgiirbis_64.exe?C21COM=F&I21DBN=UJRN&P21DBN=UJRNnatural/Nvuu/Ist/2008_21/001.htm
