= Nil Lushchak =

Ukrainian Ruthenian Catholic hierarch (born 1973)

Nil Lushchak O.F.M.
- Auxiliary Bishop of Mukachevo; Titular Bishop of Flenucleta
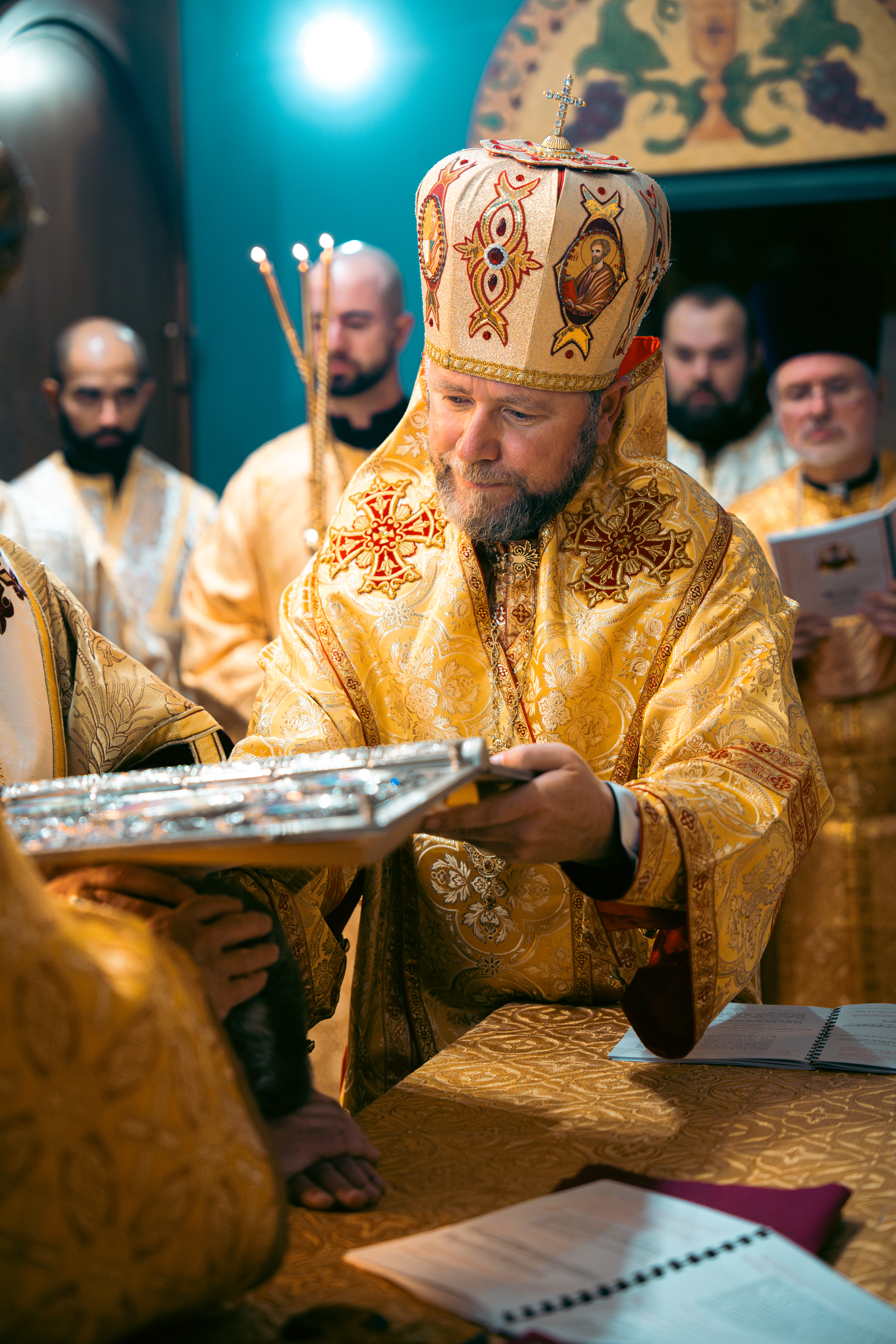
- Church: Ruthenian Greek Catholic Church
- Diocese: Eparchy of Mukachevo
- Appointed: 19 November 2012
- Predecessor: Milan Šašik
- Successor: incumbent
- Previous post: Apostolic Administrator of the Eparchy of Mukachevo (2020–2024)

Orders
- Ordination: 2 July 1996 (Priest) by Ivan Semedi
- Consecration: 12 January 2013 (Bishop) by Milan Šašik

Personal details
- Born: Yuriy Yuriyovych Lushchak; 22 May 1973 (age 53) Uzhhorod, Ukrainian SSR, Soviet Union
- Coat of arms

Nil Lushchak O.F.M. (Ukrainian: Ніл Лущак, born Yuriy Yuriyovych Lushchak, Ukrainian: Юрій Юрійович Лущак; born 22 May 1973) is a Ukrainian Ruthenian Catholic hierarch, who serves as an Auxiliary Bishop of the Eparchy of Mukachevo. Previously served as Apostolic Administrator of the same eparchy from 2020 to 2024.

== Life ==
Born on 22 May 1973 in Uzhhorod, Ukrainian SSR, present day - Ukraine as Yuriy Lushchak. After primary and secondary schools and the military service according to conscription in the Armed Forces of Ukraine he was student rates Philosophy and Theology in the Eparchial Seminary in Uzhhorod.

Coat of arms of Bishop Nil Lushchak

2 July 1996 was ordained a priest. Later served a variety of pastoral work, was originally vicar, then - the pastor. From 2004 to 2008, studied at the Pontifical Urbaniana University in Rome and where he received a licentiate's degree in philosophy.

In 2009 he entered the mendicant Order of Friars Minor, where he took the religious name "Nil" in honour of Saint Nil of Grottaferrata and in 2010 has made temporal vows.

November 19, 2012, the Pope Benedict XVI appointed Fr. Nil titular bishop of Flenucleta, Auxiliary Bishop of the Eparchy of Mukachevo.

In December 4, 2012 Elected Bishop Nil made his solemn profession in the Franciscan community.

In addition to native Ukrainian, Lushchak can speak Italian and Russian.
