= Ivan Semedi =

- Eparch of Mukacheve
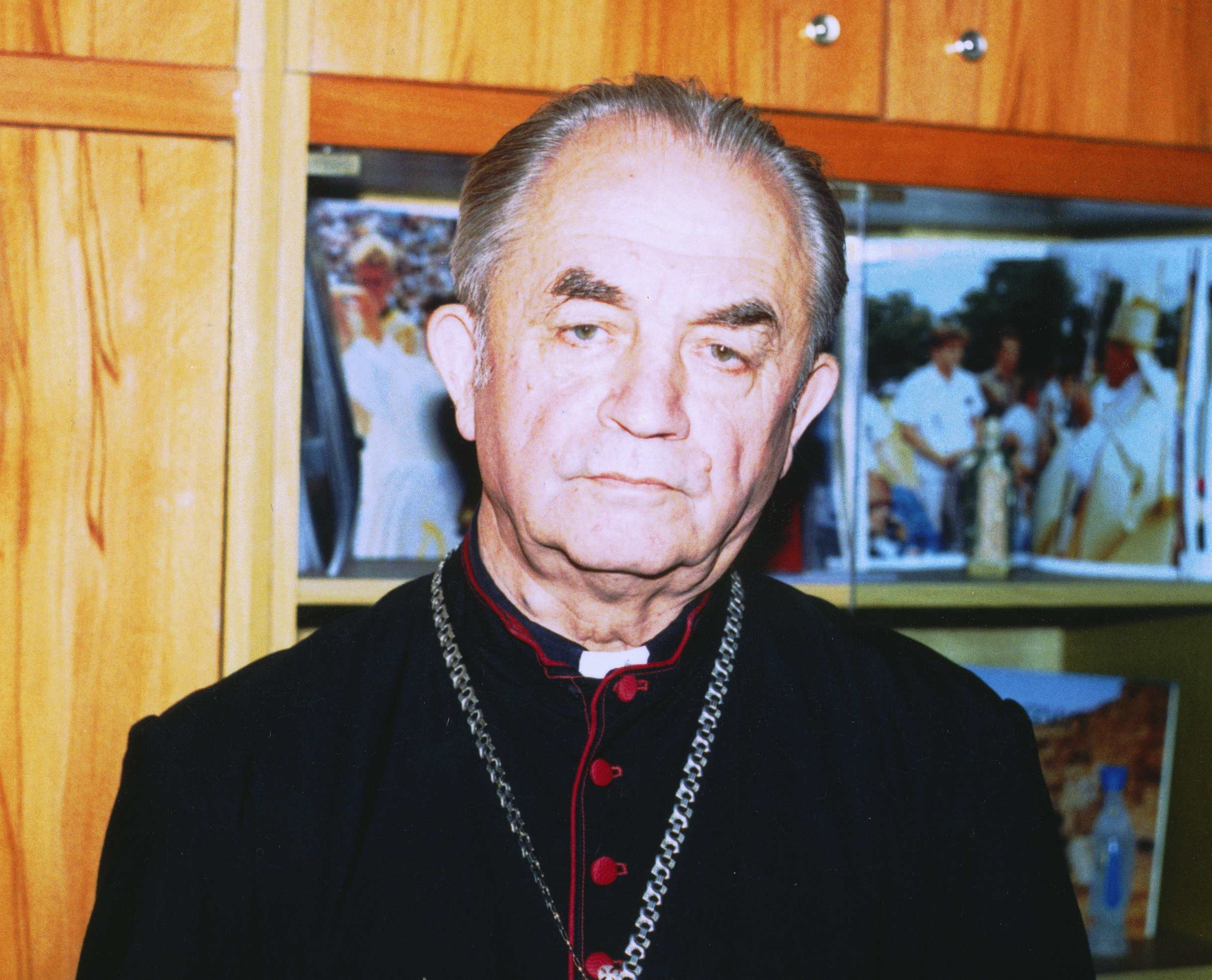
- Church: Ruthenian Greek Catholic Church
- Diocese: Eparchy of Mukacheve
- Appointed: 26 May 1983
- Term ended: 12 November 2002
- Predecessor: T. Romzha, died 1947
- Successor: Milan Šašik

Orders
- Ordination: 6 July 1947 (Priest)
- Consecration: 24 August 1978 (Bishop)

Personal details
- Born: 21 June 1921 Mala Kopanya, Czechoslovakia
- Died: December 6, 2008 (aged 87)

Ivan Semedi (1921–2008) was bishop of the Eparchy of Mukacheve from 1983 to 2002.

== Life ==
Ivan Semedi was born in Mala Kopanya on 21 June 1921. He was ordained a Priest at the age of 26. On 24 August 1978 he was consecrated bishop of Mukacheve, Ukraine. He held the post for 24 years until he retired in 2002. He was succeeded by Milan Šašik.

He died on 6 December 2008.
