= Francis Carroll =

Francis Carroll may refer to:

- Francis Carroll (archbishop of Canberra and Goulburn) (1930–2024), Australian Roman Catholic archbishop
- Francis Carroll (bishop of Calgary) (1890–1967), Canadian Roman Catholic bishop
- Francis Carroll (nuncio) (1912–1980), Northern Irish Roman Catholic archbishop and diplomat
