= Eparchy of Mukachevo and Prešov =

Former diocese of the Serbian Orthodox Church

Location
- Territory: eastern Czechoslovakia
- Headquarters: Mukachevo, modern-day Ukraine

Information
- Denomination: Eastern Orthodox
- Sui iuris church: Serbian Orthodox Church
- Established: 1931 (dissolved in 1945)
- Language: Church Slavonic

The Eparchy of Mukachevo and Prešov (Serbian: Епархија мукачевско-прешовска, romanized: Eparhija mukačevsko-prešovska) was diocese (eparchy) of the Serbian Orthodox Church, that existed from 1931 to 1945. It had jurisdiction over regions of Slovakia (Slovak: Slovensko) and Subcarpathian Rusynia (Rusyn: Підкарпатьска Русь), at that time parts of Czechoslovakia. Its seat was in Mukachevo.

== History ==
=== Earlier history ===
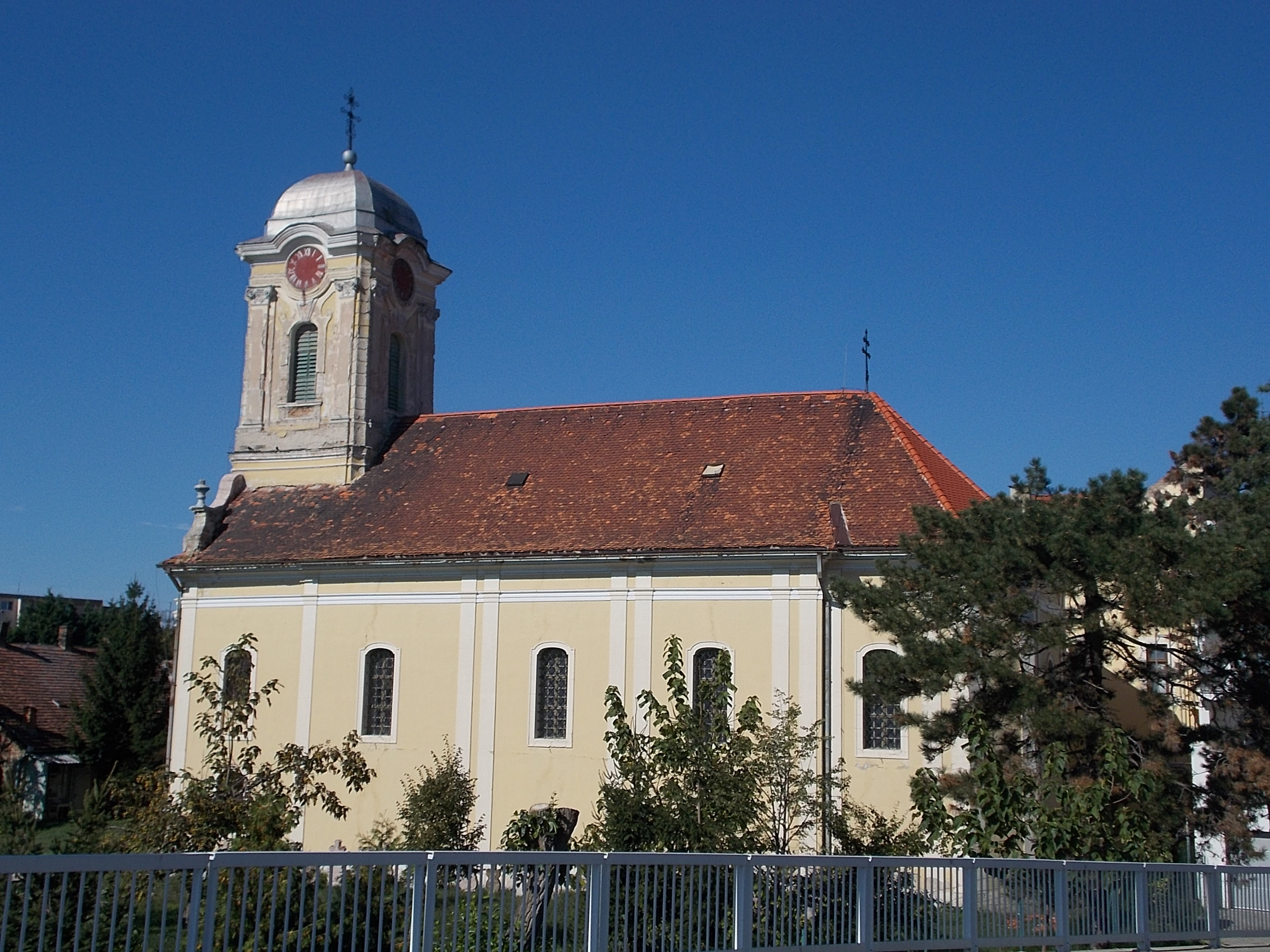
Eastern Orthodox Church in Komárno (Slovakia), built in the middle of 18th century under jurisdiction of the Serbian Orthodox Eparchy of Buda

The early history of Eastern Orthodox Christianity in the regions of Mukachevo (southwestern part of modern Ukraine) and Prešov (eastern Slovakia) was marked by missions of two famous saints, Cyril and Methodius and their disciples in Great Moravia and neighbouring Slavic lands during 9th and 10 century. After the Hungarian conquest of the region and the acceptance of Roman Catholicism as official form of Christianity in the medieval Kingdom of Hungary, Eastern Orthodoxy was gradually suppressed. Ecclesiastical order of Eastern Orthodox Church in the region was later revived under the influence of Metropolitanate of Kiev in Kievan Rus. During the late Middle Ages an Eastern Orthodox Eparchy of Mukachevo existed under the jurisdiction of Metropolitanate of Kiev.

Eastern Orthodoxy was especially strong among the population of Rusyns, until the middle of 17th century when the Union of Uzhhorod (1646) was brought about in the Kingdom of Hungary. As a result of the Union, a separate Greek Catholic Eparchy of Mukachevo was created. During the times of suppression, remaining Eastern Orthodox Christians from the region established ties with neighboring Eastern Orthodox Eparchy of Buda of the Serbian Patriarchate of Peć and later with the Metropolitanate of Karlovci (Patriarchate of Karlovci after 1848). One of the most northern parishes of the Serbian Orthodox Church existed in the city of Komárom (Komárno) with local church built in 18th century still standing today. During 18th and 19th century, authorities of Austria-Hungary were suppressing Eastern Orthodoxy in the region, and even at the beginning of 20th century Christians who wanted to reestablish Eastern Orthodox structure in the region of Mukachevo were judicially persecuted in the "Marmaroš trials" (first in 1904, second in 1913), just because in 1902–1903 they approached Serbian Orthodox Bishop Lukijan Bogdanović of Buda and Serbian Patriarch Georgije Branković of Karlovci, asking them to create new parishes in the region. Initiative was stopped by state authorities and initiators were prosecuted and sentenced.

=== Establishment of the eparchy ===
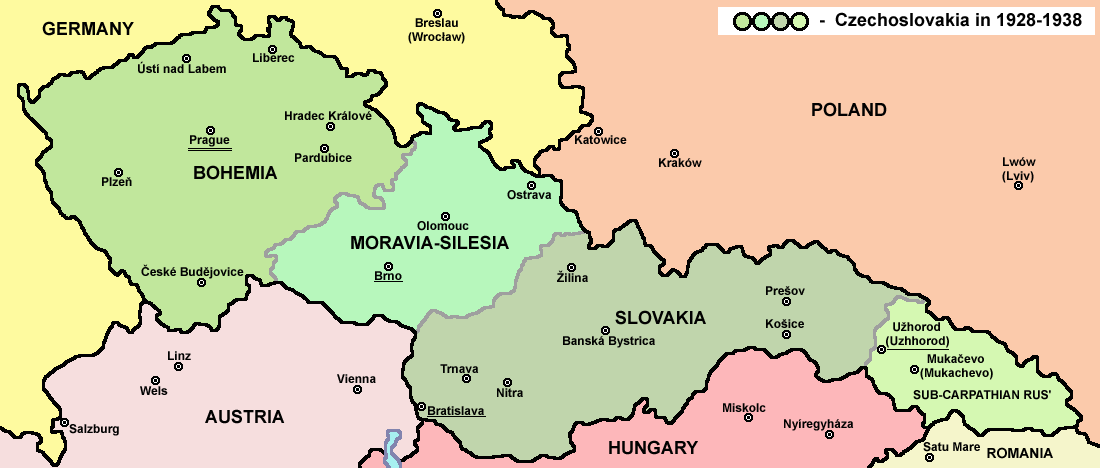
Czechoslovakia, from 1920 to 1938

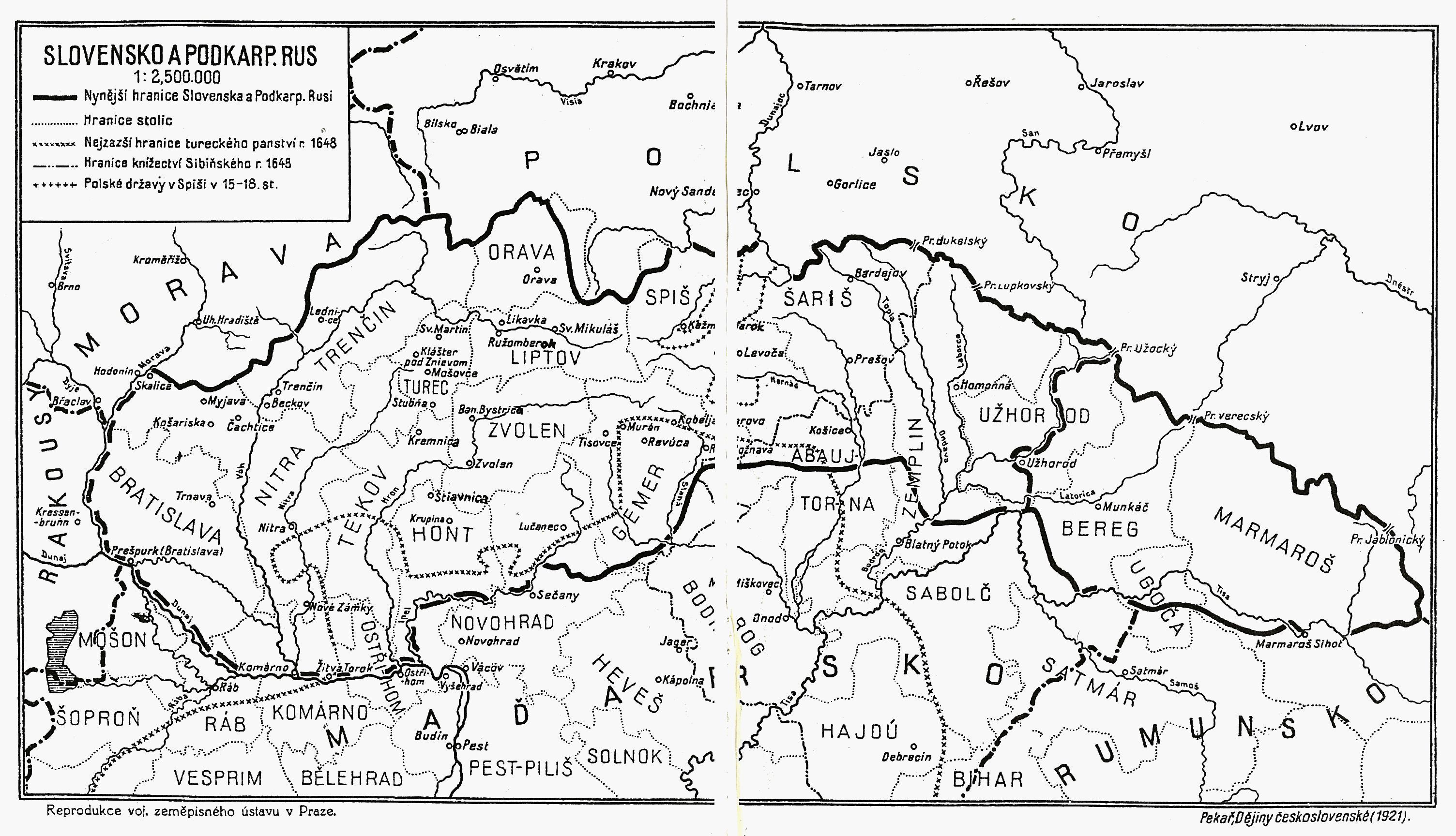
Regions of Slovakia and Subcarpathian Rusynia, from 1920 to 1938

Only after the creation of Czechoslovakia in 1918, legal restraints to Eastern Orthodoxy were removed. In the new state, Eastern Orthodox communities were mainly located in the eastern parts of the country, including Carpathian Rusynia that was incorporated into Czechoslovakia in 1919. In that region, the city of Mukachevo was located with its traditions going back to the old Eastern Orthodox Eparchy of Mukachevo, that existed until the Union of Užgorod. In the spirit of Eastern Orthodox revival, many people in the region left the jurisdiction of Greek Catholic Church. Since there were no Eastern Orthodox bishops in Czechoslovakia, local leaders looked to the Serbian Orthodox Church because Serbs were historically and ethnically close to Czechs, Slovaks, and Rusyns. That view was also supported by state authorities of Czechoslovakia (1920). In order to regulate the ecclesiastical order, Bishop Dositej Vasić of Niš (Serbia) arrived in Czechoslovakia and met with leaders of Eastern Orthodox community, receiving them into full communion (1921).

Among those wanting to restore ties with Eastern Orthodoxy was a Catholic priest Matěj Pavlík, who had been interested in Eastern Orthodoxy. The Serbian Orthodox Church thus consented to receive him in full communion and he became Archimandrite with the name Gorazd, in honor of Saint Gorazd of Moravia disciple and successor of Saint Methodius, Archbishop of Moravia. On 25 September 1921, Archimandrite Gorazd was consecrated Bishop of Moravia and Silesia at the Cathedral of Saint Archangel Michael in Belgrade, Yugoslavia, by Serbian Patriarch Dimitrije. Bishop Gorazd received jurisdiction over Czech Lands.

Since jurisdiction of Bishop Gorazd was confined to Czech lands, Eastern Orthodox Christians in Slovakia and Carpathian Rusynia were placed under administration of visiting bishops of Serbian Orthodox Church who were gradually preparing the creation of a new eparchy.

Final preparations were made during the visit of Serbian Bishop Josif Cvijović in 1930. By the end of 1931, Eastern Orthodox renewal in eastern Slovakia and Carpathian Rusynia was progressing well, allowing the creation of a new Diocese that was named: Eparchy of Mukachevo and Prešov. The Diocese was created under the auspices of Serbian Orthodox Church. First bishop of Mukachevo and Prešov was Damaskin Grdanički, who established administrative structures of new eparchy and created a well-organized diocesan center in Mukachevo. In 1938, he was succeeded by Bishop Vladimir Rajić.

In 1938, after First Vienna Award, southern parts of Slovakia and Carpathian Rusynia were annexed by Hungary. Since the city of Mukachevo was taken by Hungary, bishop Vladimir had to move to the city of Khust. In 1939, the Nazi Germany annexed the remainder of the Czech lands into the Protectorate of Bohemia and Moravia and installed a pro-Nazi regime in the Slovak State. In the same time, Hungary occupied the rest of Carpathian Rusynia and in 1941 Hungarian authorities deported bishop Vladimir Rajić to Serbia.

Years of Nazi occupation (1938/9-1944/5) were marked by renewed restrictions and persecutions of Eastern Orthodoxy. In 1945, after the integration of Zakarpattia Oblast into USSR, eastern parts of the Eparchy of Mukachevo and Prešov were transferred from the supreme jurisdiction of Serbian Orthodox Church to the jurisdiction of the Russian Orthodox Church, and on that territory new Eparchy of Mukachevo and Užgorod was formed, while the western part of the diocese remained in Czechoslovakia and was reorganized as Eparchy of Prešov.

== List of bishops ==
- Damaskin Grdanički (1931–1938)
- Vladimir Rajić (1938–1945)

== See also ==
- Orthodox Church of the Czech Lands and Slovakia
- List of eparchies of the Serbian Orthodox Church

== Bibliography ==
- Ćirković, Sima (2004). The Serbs. Malden: Blackwell Publishing. ISBN 9781405142915.
- Kiminas, Demetrius (2009). The Ecumenical Patriarchate: A History of Its Metropolitanates with Annotated Hierarch Catalogs. Wildside Press LLC. ISBN 9781434458766.
- Kalkandjieva, Daniela (2015). The Russian Orthodox Church, 1917-1948: From Decline to Resurrection. New York: Routledge. ISBN 9781317657767.
- Pekar, Athanasius B. (1979). The Bishops of the Eparchy of Mukachevo, with Historical Outlines. Pittsburgh: Byzantine Seminary Pres.
- Véghseő, Tamás (2015). "Reflections on the Background to the Union of Uzhhorod / Ungvár (1646)" (PDF). Eastern Theological Journal. 1 (1): 147–181.
- Вуковић, Сава (1996). Српски јерарси од деветог до двадесетог века (Serbian Hierarchs from the 9th to the 20th Century). Евро, Унирекс, Каленић.
