= Greek Catholic Cathedral, Uzhhorod =

Cathedral in Uzhorod, Ukraine

Coordinates: 48°37′22″N 22°18′08″E

Greek Catholic Cathedral
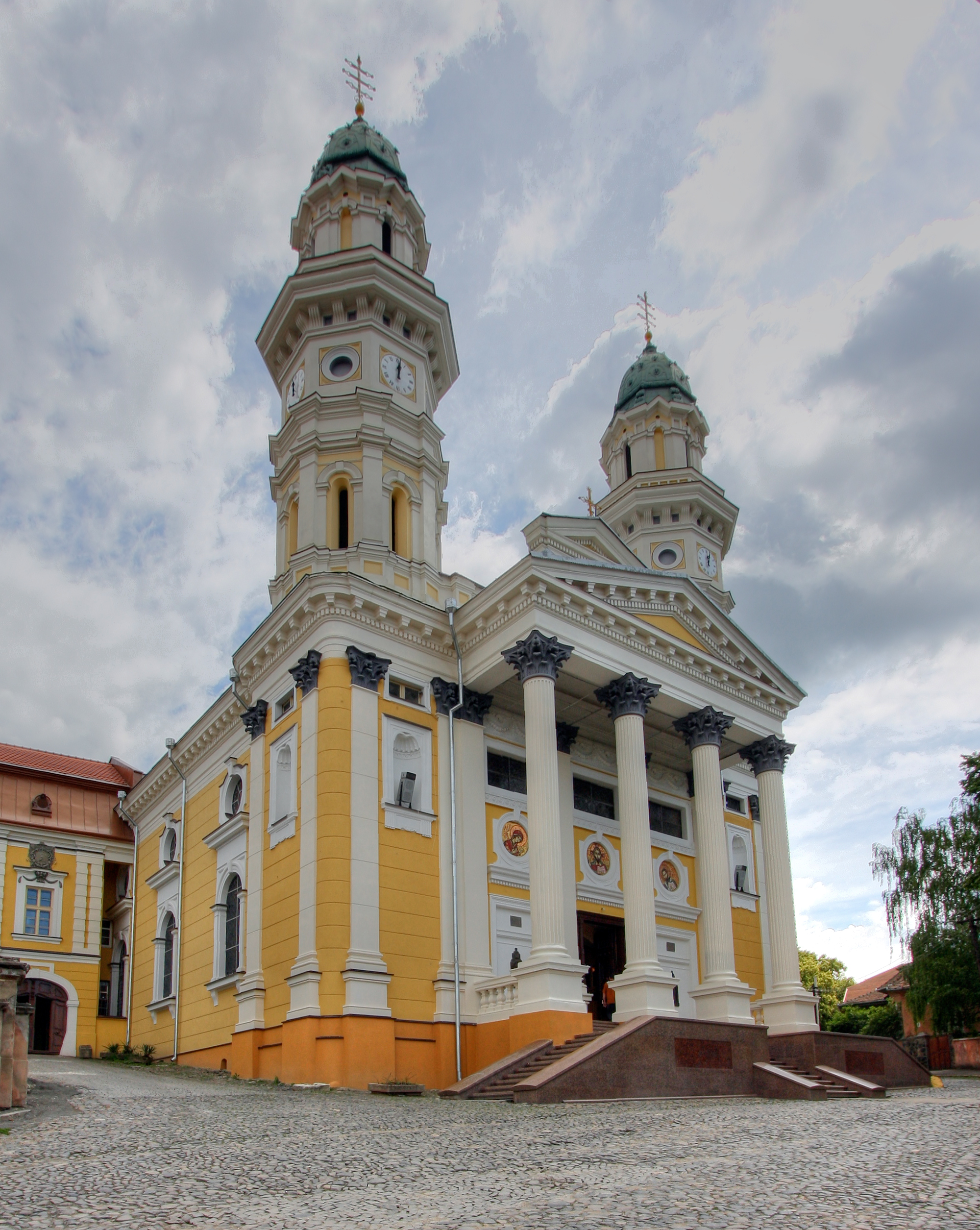

Religion
- Affiliation: Eastern Catholic Churches
- Rite: Byzantine Rite
- Year consecrated: 24 April 2010

Location
- Interactive map of Greek Catholic Cathedral

Holy Cross Cathedral is a Ruthenian Greek Catholic cathedral of Eparchy of Mukachevo in Uzhhorod, Ukraine. It is dedicated to the Exaltation of the Holy Cross.

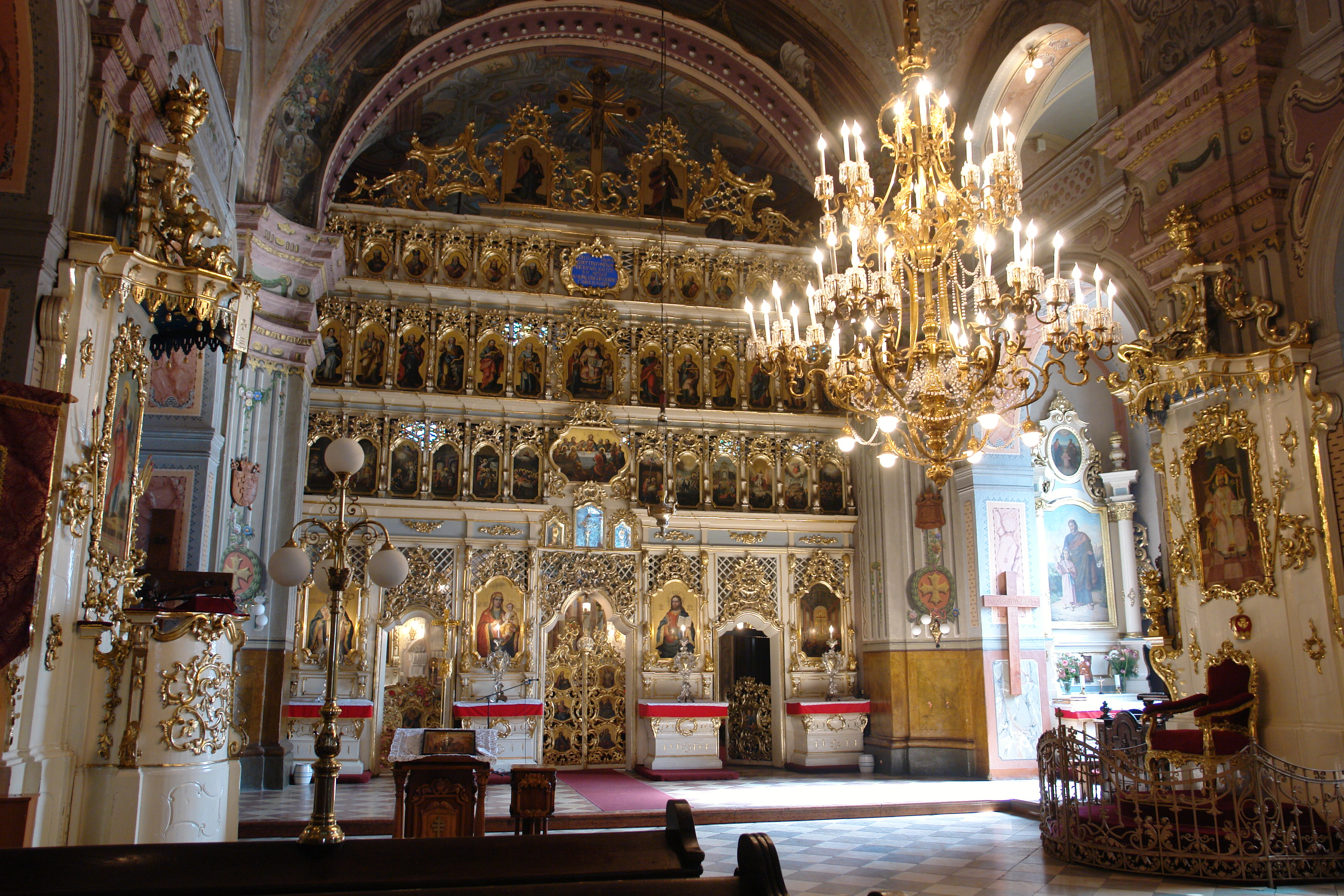
The iconostasis

The Baroque church was built in 1646 at the behest of the Jesuits from funds donated by the Drugeth noble family. It sustained some damage during Rákóczi's War of Independence. After the Society of Jesus was suppressed in 1773, Empress Maria Theresa allowed the Greek Catholics to take possession of the building. It was renovated to László Fabri's Neoclassical designs in 1848.

During the Soviet period (1945–1991) the building was transferred to the Russian Orthodox Church. On October 10, 1991, after the legalization and restoration of the Greek Catholic Church, the cathedral was returned to the Greek Catholic Eparchy of Mukachevo. On June 28, 2003, the relics of Blessed Theodore Romzha were translated to the cathedral.

According to the official website of the Eparchy of Mukachevo, it still does not have its episcopal residence.

== See also ==
- Uzhhorod Orthodox Cathedral
