= Union of Uzhhorod =

1646 religious union

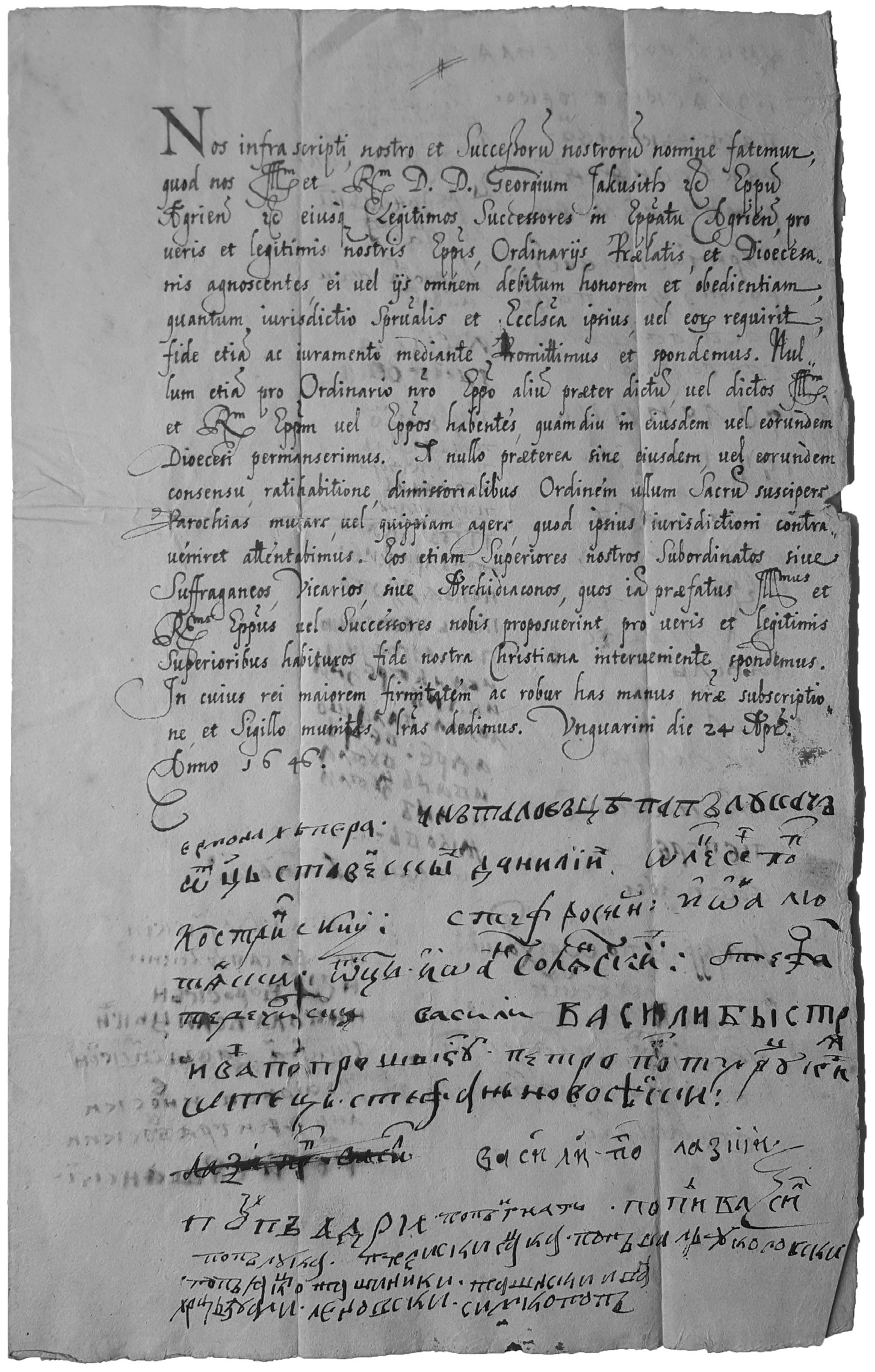
- The front and reverse of the Union of Uzhhorod containing the document text and signatures of priests.

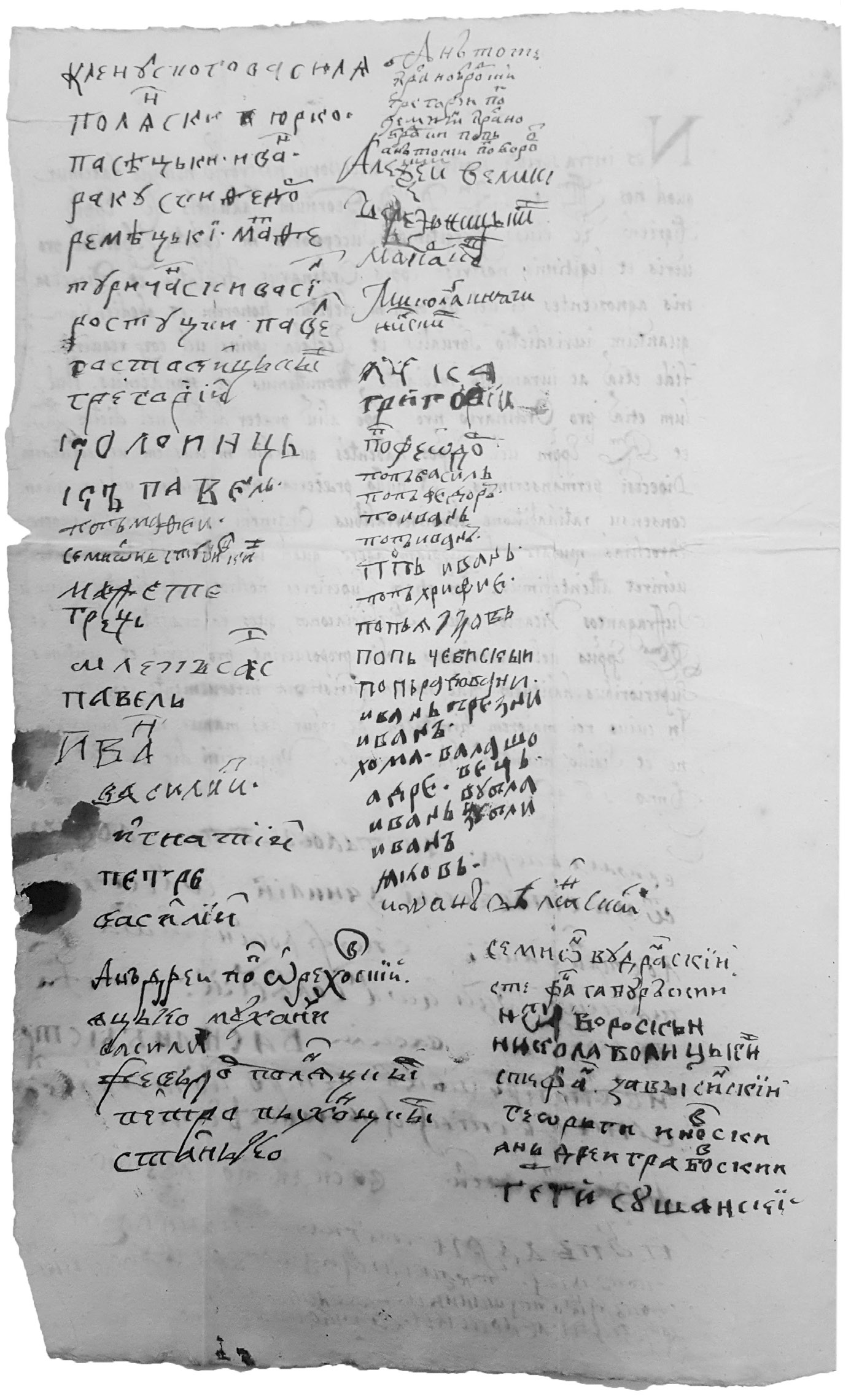
- Material: "contemporary paper"
- Height: 31.5 centimetres (12.4 in)
- Width: 19.5 centimetres (7.7 in)
- Writing: Latin
- Symbols: Latin
- Created: April 24, 1646; Uzhhorod, Royal Hungary
- Discovered: 2016; Drugeth of Humenné Collection; State Archive of Prešov, Slovakia
- Discovered by: Juraj Gradoš
- Culture: Ruthenian

The Union of Uzhhorod (Ukrainian: Ужгородська унія, romanized: Uzhhorodska uniia; Rusyn: Ужгородьска унія, romanized: Uzhhorodska uniia), was a decision by 63 Ruthenian priests of the Orthodox Eparchy of Mukachevo (then divided between the Principality of Transylvania and Royal Hungary of the Habsburg monarchy) to join the Catholic Church made on April 24, 1646. Until rediscovery of its founding document in 2016, academics had debated the actual date of union, whether a document had been signed, and even whether the Union of Uzhhorod had even transpired at all.

The terms outlined within the document are similar those of the 1596 Union of Brest from the Polish–Lithuanian Commonwealth. As outlined initially, the Union only concerned the manorial estates of the Drugeth family of Royal Hungary. However, it eventually grew to govern Eastern Catholics throughout Ukraine, Slovakia, Hungary, and Romania through subsequent agreements. The modern result of this union is the Ruthenian Greek Catholic Church.

== Text and history of the Union document ==
The document discovered in 2016 is only a single sheet of paper, front and back. The front of the page consists of a half-page of Latin text, detailing the terms of Union, and a half-page of signatures from various priests; the back of the page solely includes further signatures.

Nos infra scripti, nostro et Successoru nostroru nomine fatemur, quod nos Illm et Rm D. D. Georgium Jakusith etc Eppu Agrien etc eiusq Legitimos Successores in Eppatu Agrien, pro ueris et legitimis nostris Eppis, Ordinarijs, Praelatis, et Dioecesanis agnoscentes, ei uel ijs omnem debitum honorem et obedientiam, quantum iurisdictio Sprualis et Ecclsca ipsius, uel eor requirit, fide etia ac iuramento mediante Promittimus et spondemus. Nullum etia pro Ordinario nro Eppo aliu praeter dictu, uel dictos Illm et Rm Eppm uel Eppos habentes, quam diu in eiusdem uel eorundem Dioecesi permanserimus. A nullo praeterea sine eiusdem, uel eorundem consensu, ratihabitione, dimissiorialibus Ordinem ullum Sacru suscipers Parochias mutars, uel quippiam agers, quod ipsius iurisdictioni contrauéniret atténtabimus. Eos etiam Superiores nostros Subordinatos sine Suffraganeos, Vicarios, siue Archidiaconos, quos id praefatus Illmus et Rms Eppus uel Successores nobis proposuerint, pro ueris et legitimis Superioribus habituros fide nostra Christiana interueniente spondemus. In cuius rei maiorem firmitatem ac robur has manus nrae subscriptione et Sigillo munitas lras dedimus. Vnguarini die 24 Apr. Anno 1646.
We, the undersigned, declare in our names and those of our successors, that, recognizing the most illustrious and reverend master [bishop], Master [Bishop] George Jakusith [Jakusics] etc., Bishop of Eger, and his legitimate successors in the [Catholic] See of Eger, for our true and legitimate bishops – ordinary, prelate, and diocesan – promise and pledge to him and to them every deserved distinction and obedience – insofar as his or their spiritual and ecclesiastical jurisdiction requires – with our faithfulness and oath mediating, having no one as our ordinary bishop apart from him named or those named as most illustrious or reverend bishop or bishops as long as we abide in his or their diocese. Moreover, we will attempt by no agreement without his or their consent, to undertake any sacred ordination for those dismissed, to change parishes, or to do anything which would contravene his jurisdiction. We pledge that we will have those (bishops) as our superiors, subordinates or suffragans, vicars or archdeacons, whom the aforementioned most illustrious and most reverend bishop or his successors will put forward, as our true and legitimate superiors, with our Christian faithfulness intervening. With a view to the greater steadfastness and force of this matter we have written this letter, confirmed by the signature of our hands and by a seal. Ungvar [Uzhhorod], April 24, 1646.

— Union of Uzhhorod, 1646

As of 2016, it was unknown whether the document of the Union found was the only copy, or if there were originally multiple.

As of 2016, the document was located in the Drugeth of Humenné Collection in the state archive in Prešov. Originally, the document was part of the Drugeth family private archives located in Humenné, Slovakia. Somewhat miraculously, the document survived multiple relocations during the World Wars and a fire in 1947 before being transferred to state institutions, under which it was moved to Levoča in 1952, and finally Prešov in 1957.

== Background ==
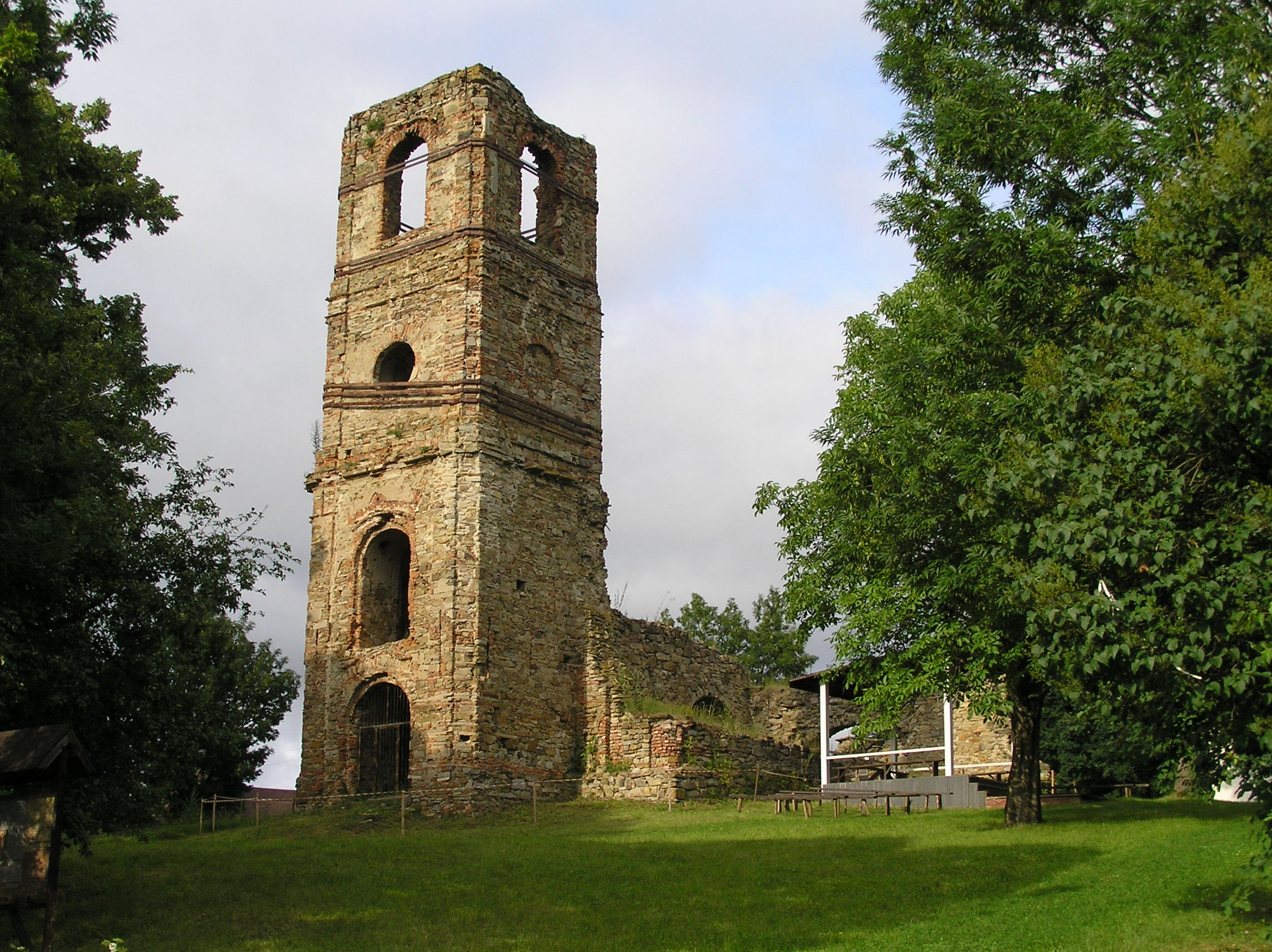
The Krasny Brod Monastery, site of the 1614 meeting

The Union of Uzhhorod was not the first union between the Roman Catholic Church and Eastern Orthodox clergy. It was preceded by the 1595 Union of Brest in the Polish-Lithuanian Commonwealth. In fact, several parishes of northeastern Hungary fell under the jurisdiction of the historic Eparchy of Peremyshl and so when Bishop Atanasii Krupetskyi of Peremyshl brought news of the Union to the region, he subsequently began administration of the first "united" parishes within Royal Hungary.

On the Hungarian side of the Carpathian Mountains, as on the Polish side, the Orthodox Church had been the only church for the more than 600 years since Eastern Christians Slavs had first arrived in the Carpathians. However, under the governance of the Kingdom of Hungary (and later the Habsburg monarchy), Orthodox clergy saw their status slowly erode. In the 16th century, when Hungary implemented proprietary serfdom, Orthodox clergy were enserfed along with peasants, while Catholic clergy were exempt. Even the Bishop of Mukachevo was at the mercy of the Hungarian lords. As Orthodox clergy, their status became that of vassals with requisite feudal duties. To improve their conditions, some Orthodox priests wished to form a new church under the Catholic church. Simultaneously, "Roman Catholic magnates lead by the Drugeth family" sought to expand the reach of the Roman Catholic Church. These forces culminated in several attempts to implement church union.

First, in 1614, 50 priests convened at the Krasny Brod Monastery with this intent, but a crowd of Orthodox protested and dispersed the group. Later that same year, Bishop Vasyl Tarasovych traveled to Mukachevo (then within the neighboring Principality of Transylvania) to announce a union with the Catholic Church, though this never formally materialized. A second attempt in Hungary in the 1630s under also failed, though Tarasovych personally accepted union in May, 1642 at Laxenburg, Austria before Emperor Ferdinand II and Bishop György Lappay. Finally, in April 1646, Bishop Petro Parfenii was able to convene a meeting of 63 (out of a few hundred) priests who would pledge their allegiance to the Pope of Rome.

== History ==
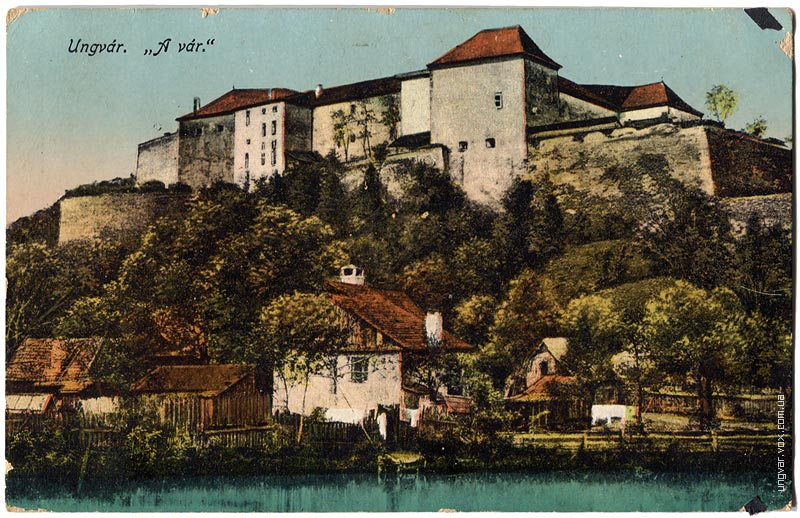
A postcard from 1914 depicting Uzhhorod Castle

On April 24, 1646, the 63 priests from Drugeth-owned estates convened at Uzhhorod Castle on invitation from Count György Drugeth himself. The half-page document (and page-and-a-half of signatures) produced that day in the presence of the Roman Catholic Bishop of Eger György Jakusics came to be known as the Union of Uzhhorod. Surprisingly, it did not discuss the actual conditions of the Union (like later, related documents), but rather functioned to document the incardination into the Roman Catholic Church of the clergy present. In any case, the 1646 document initiated the process of union between the Roman Catholic Church and the Greek Catholic Eparchy of Mukachevo (though this process was not wholly complete until the mid-18th century), essentially forming the foundation of the modern Ruthenian Greek Catholic Church.

Initially, the Union only included lands owned or administered by the noble Drugeth family; essentially, most of the modern-day Presov Region and part of Zakarpattia Oblast: Abaúj County, Gömör County, Sáros County, Szepes County, Torna County, northern Zemplén County, parts of Ung County, and the city of Uzhhorod itself. Though seemingly substantial, the 63 signatories of the Union effectively made up about only ten percent of all priests in the Orthodox Greek Catholic Eparchy of Mukachevo: the eastern counties within the Eparchy were subjects of the anti-Catholic, Calvinist Principality of Transylvania, and outside the reach of Habsburg control. Consequently, Bereg, Ugocsa, and Maramorosh counties would go on to practice Orthodox Christianity for almost a century.Some priests in the eastern counties of Bereg and Maramaros remained Orthodox until 1745. Thus, from 1646 until 1721, when the last Orthodox priests in the western counties accepted the Union, the Rusyns had two bishops, a new Greek Catholic bishop and the original Orthodox bishop.

Sometime after its creation at least one copy of the Union entered the Drugeth family private archives located in Humenné, Slovakia, where it was ultimately forgotten. Until it was rediscovered in 2016, academics had debated the actual date of union, whether a document had been signed, and even whether the Union of Uzhhorod had even transpired at all.

While the Union was later approved in 1648 by the Synod in Tyrnov, the Vatican did not ratify these conditions at that time because Parfenii Petrovich was an Orthodox bishop. Only in 1655, when Rome made Parfenii its Bishop of Mukachevo did the Union extend to the East.

The new church was given greater material assistance from the Habsburg monarchy while still being allowed to preserve their Eastern Rite traditions, including married priests. Furthermore, the new "Uniate" priests would be elevated to the status of Roman Catholic clergy, and they were given the right to choose their own bishop, subject to the approval of Rome.

In 1949, Soviet authorities "revoked" the Union, creating the Orthodox Eparchy of Mukachiv-Uzhhorod, under the Patriarch of Moscow. But in the late 1980s the Ruthenian Greek Catholic Church was finally re-established in Transcarpathia, following the easing of Soviet religious persecution.

== Rediscovery ==
An original copy of the Union was discovered in May 2016, a half page in length followed by a page and a half of signatures of the local priests seeking full communion with the local Catholic Church. The Union is again documented in a petition dated January 16, 1652 in which six archdeans petition Vatican to confirm Petro Parfenii as the bishop of Mukachevo.

== See also ==
- Union of Brest
- Ruthenian Greek Catholic Church
- Ukrainian Greek Catholic Church
- History of Christianity in Ukraine
- Eastern Orthodox – Roman Catholic theological differences
- Eastern Orthodox – Roman Catholic ecclesiastical differences

== Sources ==
- Litwin, Henryk (1987). "Catholicization among the Ruthenian Nobility and Assimilation Processes' in the Ukraine during the Years 1569-1648" (PDF). Acta Poloniae Historica. 55: 57–83. ISSN 0001-6829.
- Magocsi, Paul Robert and Ivan Pop (2005). Encyclopedia of Rusyn History and Culture. Toronto: University of Toronto Press. ISBN 0-8020-3566-3.
- Warzeski, Walter C. (1971). Byzantine Rite Rusins in Carpatho-Ruthenia and America. Pittsburgh: Byzantine Seminary Press. ISBN none.
- Ludvik Nemec, The Ruthenian Uniate Church in Its Historical Perspective, Church History, Vol. 37, No. 4. (Dec., 1968), pp. 365–388. JStor.org
- Tóth, István György (2002). "Počiatky rekatolizácie na východnom Slovensku (The Beginning of re-Catholicization in Eastern Slovakia)". Historický časopis. 50 (4): 587–606.
- Véghseő, Tamás (2015). "Reflections on the Background to the Union of Uzhhorod / Ungvár (1646)" (PDF). Eastern Theological Journal. 1 (1): 147–181.
