= Theodore Romzha =

Rusyn Greek Catholic bishop

Blessed Theodore Romzha
- Eparch of Mukacheve
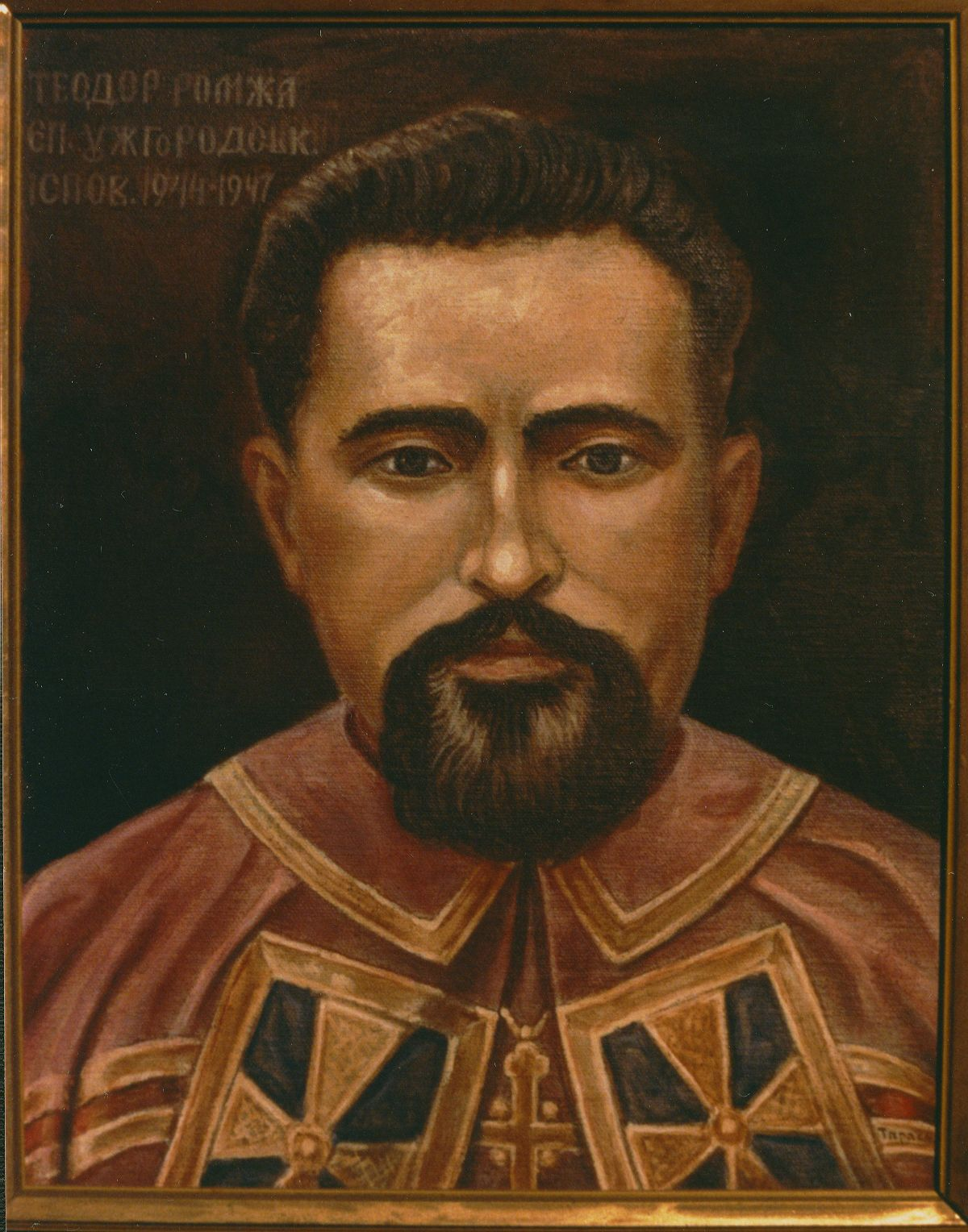
- Church: Ruthenian Greek Catholic Church
- Diocese: Eparchy of Mukacheve
- Appointed: 8 September 1944
- Term ended: 31 October 1947
- Predecessor: Oleksandr Stoika
- Successor: vacant till 1983, then Ivan Semedi

Orders
- Ordination: 25 December 1936 (Priest)
- Consecration: 24 September 1944 (Bishop)

Personal details
- Born: 14 April 1911 Nagybocskó, Austria-Hungary (now Velykyi Bychkiv, Ukraine)
- Died: 31 October 1947 (aged 36) Uzhhorod, Ukrainian SSR, Soviet Union

Sainthood
- Feast day: 31 October (martyrdom); 28 June (translation of relics)
- Venerated in: Greek Catholic Churches; Roman Catholic Church; Anglican Communion
- Title as Saint: Blessed Martyr
- Beatified: 27 June 2001; Lviv by Pope John Paul II

Theodore George Romzha (Ukrainian: Теодор Юрій Ромжа; Hungarian: Romzsa Tódor György; 14 April 1911 – 31 October 1947) was a Rusyn prelate who served as Bishop of the Greek Catholic Eparchy of Mukachevo from 1944 to 1947. Assassinated by the NKVD, he was beatified as a martyr by Pope John Paul II on 27 June 2001.

== Early life ==
Theodore Romzha was born on 14 April 1911 in Nagybocskó, a village in Subcarpathia, Austria-Hungary (today Velykyi Bychkiv, Ukraine), inhabited by Rusyns and Hungarians. In his baptism certificate, his name is recorded as Tivadar György.

His father, Pavel Romzha, worked as a railroad trackman. His mother, born Maria Semack, was a full-time homemaker. Like many ambitious families in the region, the Romzhas spoke the Hungarian language at home. In the presence of others, however, they switched to the Rusyn language. After his graduation from the Gymnasium in Chust (today Khust), and with the help of Péter Gebé, Theodore left to study for the priesthood in Rome. He began as a seminarian at the Collegium Germanicum et Hungaricum, and later switched to the Russicum. He finished his theological studies at the Pontifical Gregorian University in Rome.

Theodore was ordained a priest by Bishop Alexander Evreinov of the Russian Greek Catholic Church on Christmas Day, 1936 in the Basilica of St Mary Major. After completing his compulsory military service in the Czechoslovak Army, he served briefly as a pastor in several Subcarpathian parishes in Berezovo and Nizhny Bystriy before being assigned as professor of philosophy at the Eparchial Seminary in Ungvár (today Uzhhorod) in 1939.

== Episcopate ==
These were difficult years for the Church in Subcarpathia as the region, having been a part of Czechoslovakia since 1920, was returned to Hungary in 1938 as the result of the First Vienna Award, then briefly occupied by Nazi Germany before the arrival of the Red Army, eventually becoming part of the Soviet Union.

During these turbulent times, Theodore Romzha treated nationalities and languages as equal. To all his priests he spoke in their native language, and he used his name in the form of Tódor in Hungarian texts.

On 24 September 1944, with the region was under Nazi occupation, at the young age of 33, Romzha was consecrated bishop and appointed apostolic administrator of the Eparchy of Munkács (Mukacheve) in the cathedral of Ungvár by Bishop Miklós Dudás, O.S.B.M., in co-consecration by János Scheffler, Hungarian Roman Catholic bishop of Szatmár (Satu Mare), and István Madarász, Hungarian Roman Catholic bishop of Kassa (Košice). He chose as his episcopal motto: “I love you, O Lord, my strength; you are my stronghold and my refuge!”, from Psalm 17.

He immediately had to face the Soviet Red Army, which occupied the churches, assigned them to the Russian Orthodox Church, and arrested priests. Bishop Romzha refused to break with the Pope in front of General Petrov.

He organized a celebration of the Feast of the Assumption with the participation of more than 80,000 pilgrims but this was not tolerated by the Communist officials who now began plotting to dispose of the young bishop. On 27 October 1947, on the way home from a parish visitation, Bishop Romzha's horse-drawn carriage was purposely rammed by a Soviet military truck and pushed off the side of the road. The soldiers, who were dressed as civilians, jumped from the truck and beat the bishop and his companions.

Soon after the brutal assault began, a civilian truck came upon the scene and the assailants fled. Romzha and his companions were taken to Uzhhorod, where they were hospitalized. Romzha was making good progress when, late on the night of 31 October, the nuns who were nursing him were suddenly dismissed and a new nurse was assigned to him by the regime. A little after midnight Moscow Time, Romzha was found dead. The nurse had poisoned Romzha with an injection of curare provided by the head of NKVD Laboratory 12, Dr Grigory Mairanovsky. According to research in Soviet archives by Yevgenia Albats, the Bishop's murder was personally ordered by Nikita Khrushchev.

On 4 November 1947, a large crowd attended Romzha's funeral, despite Soviet efforts to shut down and block public transportation. He was buried in the crypt of the Holy Cross Cathedral in Uzhhorod. The Ruthenian Catholic Church was relentlessly persecuted and in 1949, it was officially suppressed. All of its properties were allocated to the Russian Orthodox Church.

== Feast day and relics ==
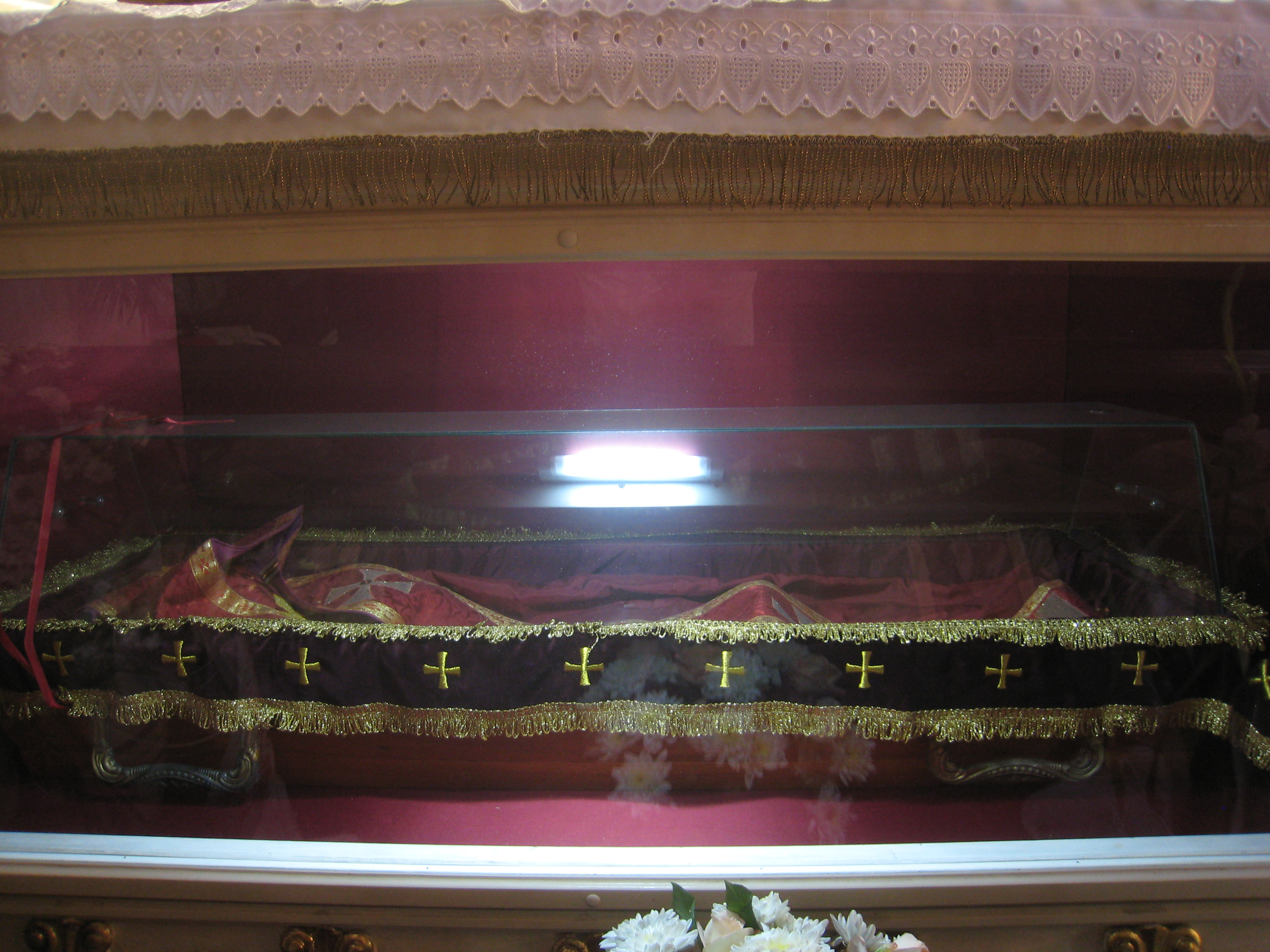
Tomb of Theodore Romzha

Romzha was beatified as a Martyr for the Faith by Pope John Paul II in Lviv on 27 June 2001, with 1 November assigned initially as his feast day. At the request of the Eparchy of Mukacheve, the Congregation for the Oriental Churches transferred the feast day to 31 October, effective 2009. Romzha died shortly after midnight 1 November, according to Moscow Time, the Soviet-imposed time zone throughout Ukraine from 1930 to 1990; however, according to local time, Romzha died before midnight on 31 October.

In 1998, the relics of Blessed Theodore were found in a tomb in the crypt of Holy Cross Cathedral in Uzhhorod, and then transported to Budapest, Hungary for medical examination. Pope John Paul II beatified Theodore Romzha in 2001. On 27–28 June 2003 his relics were translated and carried in solemn procession back to Uzhhorod, where they are enshrined in a side chapel at Holy Cross Cathedral. In commemoration of the event, a second feast day, the Translation of the Holy Relics of Blessed Theodore Romzha, is celebrated on 28 June.

== Pavlo Sudoplatov's letter ==
In a letter from Pavlo Sudoplatov, General of state security, to delegates of the 23rd Congress of the Communist Party of the Soviet Union, he stated that, "According to the instructions of Khruschev, a member of the Politburo (Central Committee of the Communist Party) of Ukraine and the first secretary in Ukraine and approved by Khruschev, Romzha was eliminated in Mukachiv. The head of the Greek Catholic Church, he had actively opposed the uniting of Greek Catholics to Orthodoxy."
