= Ruthenian Greek Catholic Church =

Eastern Catholic church

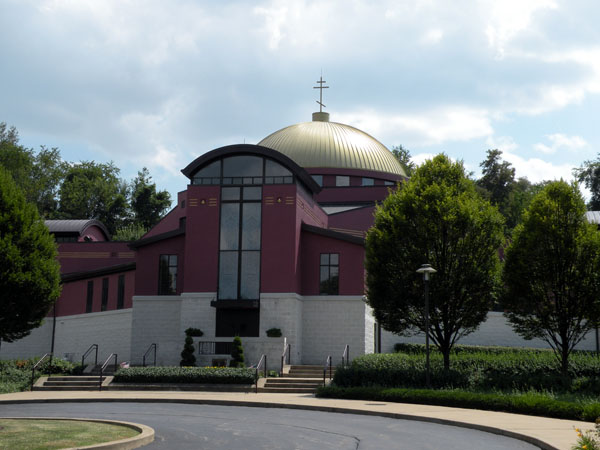
- Cathedral of St. John the Baptist in Munhall, Pennsylvania
- Type: Particular church (sui iuris)
- Classification: Christian
- Orientation: Eastern Catholic
- Theology: Catholic theology
- Polity: Episcopal
- Structure: No unified structure.
- Pope: Leo XIV
- Primate: No unified structure. William C. Skurla and Teodor Matsapula
- Associations: Dicastery for the Eastern Churches
- Region: United States; Czech Republic; Ukraine; Slovakia
- Liturgy: Byzantine Rite
- Headquarters: Cathedral of Saint John the Baptist, Munhall, Pennsylvania; 48°37′23″N 22°18′8″E
- Origin: 1646
- Merger of: Union of Uzhhorod
- Congregations: 664
- Members: 417,795
- Ministers: 549
- Primary schools: 1 in the United States
- Other name: Byzantine Catholic Church (U.S. only)
- Official website: www.archpitt.org

The Ruthenian Greek Catholic Church, (Note: Rusyn: Русиньска ґрекокатолицька церьков; Latin: Ecclesia Graeco-Catholica Ruthenica.) also known in the United States as the Byzantine Catholic Church, is a sui iuris (autonomous) Eastern Catholic particular church based in Eastern Europe and North America that is part of the worldwide Catholic Church and is in full communion with the Holy See. It uses the Byzantine Rite for its liturgies, laws, and cultural identity. The church originated at the Union of Uzhhorod in 1646, when Orthodox East Slavs with a Rusyn identity in the Carpathian Mountains returned to communion with the Pope.

The church does not have a unified structure. Its numerically largest jurisdiction is in Europe, the Greek Catholic Eparchy of Mukachevo, which reemerged in Ukraine after having been suppressed by the Soviet Union. There is also the Apostolic Exarchate of the Greek Catholic Church in the Czech Republic, founded in 1996. Both of them are exempt territories immediately subject to the Holy See.

The Metropolis of Pittsburgh is the church's self-governing jurisdiction in the United States, created in the early 20th century for Rusyn immigrants. Today it includes many members of non-Eastern European descent while still continuing Ruthenian traditions. In 1956 the U.S. jurisdiction stopped using Ruthenian Greek Catholic to describe itself, and since 1969 it has called itself the Byzantine Catholic Church, also being reorganized as a metropolitan church by Pope Paul VI. This makes the Byzantine Catholic Church the only self-governing Eastern Catholic metropolitan church in the United States. In 2022 the Slovak Greek Catholic eparchy for Canada was changed to an exarchate and was subordinated to the Byzantine Catholic Metropolis of Pittsburgh.

== Name ==
While not directly associated with the former Ruthenian Uniate Church, the Ruthenian Greek Catholic Church also derives its name from the Rusyn and Ruthenian Slavic peoples of Eastern Europe and their communion with Rome. Ruthenia was originally the Latin term for the Rus' people (from whom the name Russia was also derived) but later on, especially after the Schism of 1054 led to the separation of the East Slavs from Rome with Eastern Orthodoxy, its definition was narrowed. It was used for the Orthodox Slavs in the eastern Polish–Lithuanian Commonwealth that entered communion with the Pope at the Union of Brest in 1595 while continuing to use the Byzantine (or Greek) Rite. This was the basis for what later became the Ukrainian and Belarusian Greek Catholic churches. In 1646, further to the south in Hungary, the Slavs in the Eastern Carpathians with a Rusyn identity who entered communion with Rome at the Union of Uzhhorod were also called Ruthenians. This created the Ruthenian Greek Catholic Church. In the 19th century, the term Ruthenian Greek Catholic referred to the Carpatho-Rusyns from Austria-Hungary, though their membership also included smaller numbers of Hungarians, Slovaks, and others. Today that region is divided between Ukraine, Slovakia, Hungary, and Romania.

While Ruthenian Catholics are not the only Eastern Catholics to utilize the Byzantine Rite in the United States, the Ruthenian Greek Catholic Church refers to itself as the "Byzantine Catholic Church" for its U.S. jurisdiction. Its full official name is the Byzantine Catholic Metropolitan Church of Pittsburgh.

== History ==
The Ruthenian Church originally developed among the Rusyn people who lived in Carpathian Ruthenia. Christianity and the Byzantine Rite was brought to the Slavic peoples in the 9th century as a result of the missionary outreach of Saints Cyril and Methodius, two Greek missionaries from the Byzantine Empire.

Following the Great Schism of 1054, the Ruthenian Church retained its Orthodox ties until the Union of Uzhhorod.

=== Union of Uzhhorod ===
The present structure of the Ruthenian Greek Catholic Church traces its origins to the 1646 Union of Uzhhorod, when Eastern Orthodox clergy were received into communion with the Holy See of Rome. Sixty three Ruthenian clergy were received into the Catholic Church; in 1664 a union reached at Munkács (today Mukachevo, Ukraine) brought additional communities into the Catholic communion. In 1771 Pope Clement XIV established the Greek Catholic Eparchy of Mukachevo as a suffragan of the primate of Hungary, to give the Ruthenian Greek Catholics a jurisdiction that was separate from the Latin Church.

Initially, the Union only included lands owned or administered by the noble Drugeth family; essentially, most of the modern-day Presov Region and part of Zakarpattia Oblast: Abov County, Gömör County, Sáros County, Szepes County, Torna County, northern Zemplén County, parts of Ung County, and the city of Uzhhorod itself.

The resulting dioceses retained their Byzantine patrimony and liturgical traditions, and their bishops were elected by a council composed of Basilian monks and eparchial clergy. In this part of central and eastern Europe, the Carpathian Mountains straddle the borders of the present-day states of Hungary, Poland, Slovakia, Romania and Ukraine. Today, the church is multi-ethnic. Members of the metropolitan province of Pittsburgh are predominantly English-speaking. Most are descendants of Rusyns – including sub-groups like the Boikos, Hutsuls and Lemkos – but the descendants of other nationalities are also present such as Slovaks, Hungarians and Croats as well as those of non-Slavic and non-Eastern European ancestry.

=== Eastern Europe ===
After almost a thousand years of Hungarian rule the region became, in part, incorporated in Czechoslovakia after World War I. During the 1920s some Ruthenian Catholics joined Orthodoxy, helping create the Orthodox Church of the Czech Lands and Slovakia. After World War II the region was divided between two communist states: the Soviet Union and Czechoslovakia. The political changes after the war led to persecution of the Ruthenian Catholic Church in both countries, and also in the Lemko area of Poland. This began a period of Ruthenian history that saw deportations, integration with the Orthodox Church, and assimilation into Ukrainian identity. The modern Eparchy of Mukachevo in Ukraine is mostly Ukrainian-speaking but remains part of the greater Ruthenian Church.

Since the collapse of Communism, the Ruthenian Catholic Church in Eastern Europe has seen a resurgence in numbers, both of lay people and priests. In 1996 the Apostolic Exarchate of the Greek Catholic Church in the Czech Republic was established by Pope John Paul II in the predominantly Slovak Greek Catholic eparchy of Prešov. There is a Rusyn population there, although another reason for this was because some Roman Catholic priests who had been secretly ordained in Czechoslovakia were married, which limited them to serving as deacons in the Latin Church. In 1997 some of them were received into the Apostolic Exarchate of the Ruthenian Church, where married priests are accepted.

=== United States ===
==== Immigration and early growth ====
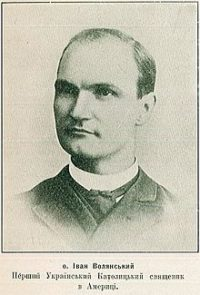
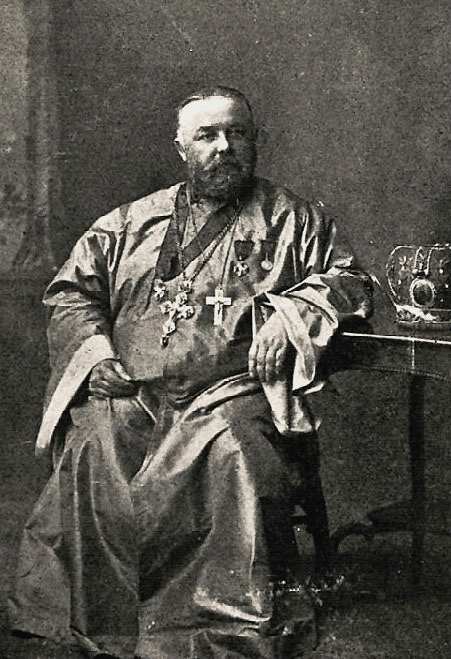
Father John Voliansky and Father Alexis Toth

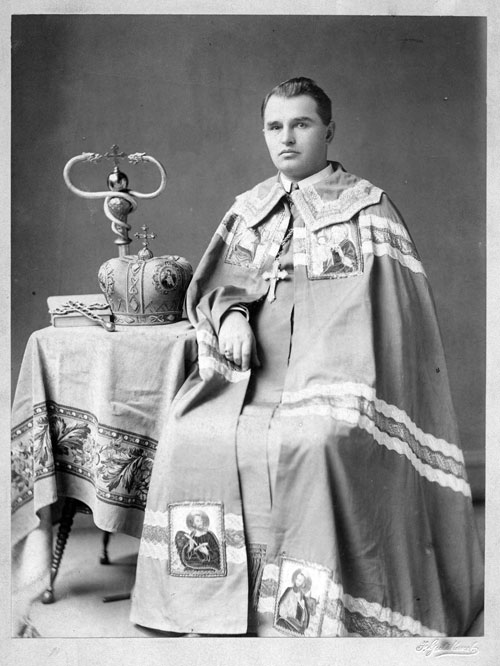
Bishop Soter Ortynsky

In the 19th and 20th centuries, various Byzantine Catholics from Austria-Hungary arrived in the United States, particularly in coal mining towns. In 1884, Father John (sometimes rendered as Ivan) Voliansky was sent by the Metropolitan of Galicia, Sylvester Sembratovich to minister to the Rusyn and Ukrainian Byzantine Catholics in the area around Shenandoah, Pennsylvania. After the Latin Archbishop of Philadelphia and several other Latin pastors refused to grant Voliansky the use of any existing Latin churches, Fr. Voliansky rented the local Kern Hall and celebrated the first documented Ruthenian Catholic service in the United States. By 1889, Fr. Voliansky returned to Europe and saw new Byzantine Catholic parishes established in Shenandoah, Kingston, Freeland, Olyphant, and Shamokin, Pennsylvania; and in Jersey City and Minneapolis.

Prior to the creation of any independent Byzantine Catholic hierarchy, Byzantine Rite priests were required to present their credentials to the local Latin bishop and function as a priest in the local Latin diocese while still celebrating the Byzantine liturgy. This also effectively placed all Byzantine Rite parish churches under the ownership of the same Latin bishops.

Members of the predominant Latin Church Catholic hierarchy were sometimes disturbed by what they saw as the innovation, for the United States, of a married Catholic clergy. At their persistent request, the Sacred Congregation for the Propagation of the Faith applied, on 1 May 1897, to the United States rules already set out in a letter of 2 May 1890, to François-Marie-Benjamin Richard, the Latin Archbishop of Paris. These rules stated that only celibates and widowed priests coming without their children should be permitted in the United States.

The dissatisfaction of many Ruthenian Catholics had already given rise to some groups placing themselves under the jurisdiction of what is today the Orthodox Church in America (at that time a mission of the Russian Orthodox Church). The leader of this movement was the widowed Ruthenian Catholic priest Alexis Toth, whose mistreatment by Archbishop John Ireland of Saint Paul, Minnesota, led to Toth's transfer to Eastern Orthodoxy. He brought with him many Ruthenian Catholics, around 20,000 by the time of his death with many who followed afterward, and was canonized a saint by the Orthodox Church in America in 1996.

==== Establishment of an independent hierarchy in the United States ====
The situation with Alexis Toth and the Latin Catholic bishops highlighted the need for American Eastern Catholics to have their own bishop. Pope Pius X appointed the Ukrainian bishop Soter Ortynsky in 1907 as bishop for all Slavic Eastern Catholics of the Byzantine rite in America. For this period the Ruthenian Byzantine Catholics were united to the Ukrainian Greek Catholics in the same eparchy. Ethnic tensions flared due to cultural differences (mostly of a political nature) between Ukrainians who came from Austrian-ruled Galicia and the Rusyns and other Byzantine Catholics who came from the Kingdom of Hungary.

This caused Rome to split the groups after Ortynsky's death, creating two ecclesiastical administrations for Eastern-rite Catholics in the United States, divided along nationality lines: one Ukrainian and the other Carpatho-Rusyn. Each was headed not by a bishop, but by an administrator: Father Peter Poniatyshyn for the Ukrainians and Father Gabriel Martyak for the Carpatho-Rusyns. Later, the Rusyn priest Basil Takach was appointed and consecrated in Rome on his way to America as the new eparchy's bishop. Bishop Takach is considered the first bishop of Ruthenian Catholics in America, and his appointment as the official founding of the Byzantine Catholic Metropolitan Church of Pittsburgh.

Clerical celibacy of American Eastern Catholics was restated with special reference to the Byzantine/Ruthenian Church by 1 March 1929, decree Cum data fuerit, which was renewed for a further 10 years in 1939. Due to this and other similar factors, 37 Ruthenian parishes transferred themselves into the jurisdiction of the Greek Orthodox Ecumenical Patriarch in 1938, creating the American Carpatho-Russian Orthodox Diocese.

In the 1950s the Ruthenian Church in the United States began undergoing a major expansion. Around this time, Bishop Nicholas Elko, the head of the Pittsburgh Ruthenian Greek Catholic Exarchate and its first American-born bishop, began using "Byzantine Catholic" instead of Greek Catholic to clarify to Americans the ritual identification of the church. In 1956 Bishop Nicholas Elko established a newspaper called The Byzantine Catholic World. The Divine Liturgy began to be celebrated in English instead of Old Church Slavonic, a sign of the church's Americanization. A major point for the growth of the church was the Byzantine Catholic Seminary of Ss. Cyril and Methodius opening in 1951 to prepare priests for the exarchate. Due to its growth, in 1963 Pope Paul VI divided the exarchate into two jurisdictions, upgraded to eparchies, one based in Pittsburgh and one based in Passaic, New Jersey.

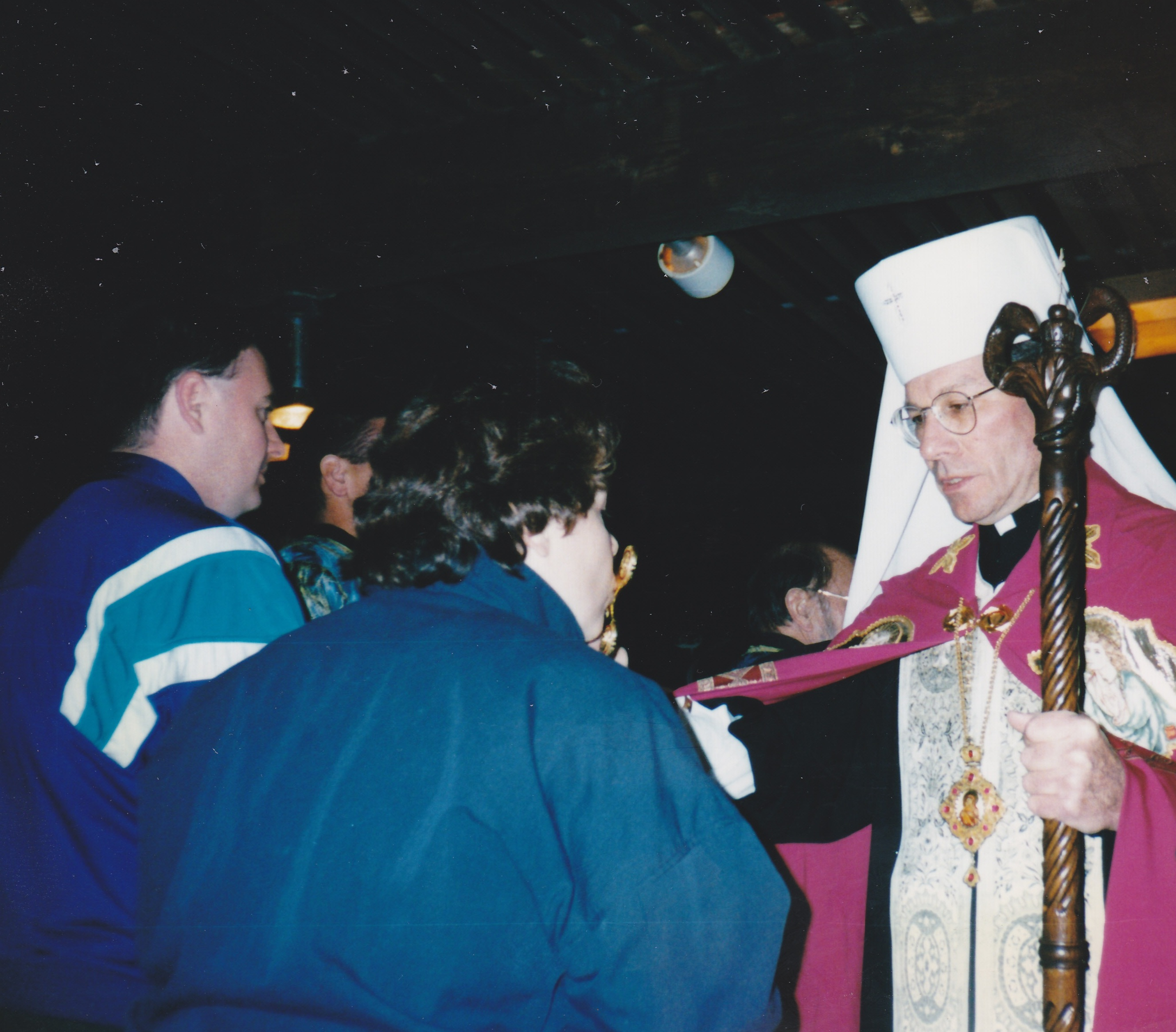
Metropolitan Judson Procyk (1931–2001) holds the cross for veneration after Vespers at a monastery pilgrimage in California in 1996.

Pope Paul VI created the Byzantine Catholic Metropolitan Church on 21 February 1969 in his decree Quando Quidem Christus. The Eparchy of Munhall in Pittsburgh was upgraded to an archeparchy, becoming the church's metropolitan see, and the Eparchy of Passaic became its suffragan diocese, along with a new diocese created for the western regions, the Eparchy of Parma, based in Parma, Ohio. The new archbishop, Stephen Kocisko, became the first metropolitan in the Ruthenian Church. In 1977 the Archeparchy of Munhall was renamed the Byzantine Catholic Archeparchy of Pittsburgh. In 1981 another eparchy was created by Pope John Paul II, the Eparchy of Van Nuys, which covered the far western United States and was based out of Van Nuys, California. Since 2010 it has been based out of Phoenix, Arizona, and renamed to Eparchy of Holy Protection of Mary of Phoenix.

Relations with the Latin Church Catholic hierarchy have improved, especially since the Second Vatican Council, at which the Ruthenian Church influenced decisions regarding using the vernacular in the liturgy. In its decree Orientalium Ecclesiarum, the Second Vatican Council urged the Eastern Rite Churches to eliminate liturgical Latinization and to strengthen their Eastern Christian identity, declaring:

The Catholic Church holds in high esteem the institutions, liturgical rites, ecclesiastical traditions and the established standards of the Christian life of the Eastern Churches, for in them, distinguished as they are for their venerable antiquity, there remains conspicuous the tradition that has been handed down from the Apostles through the Fathers and that forms part of the divinely revealed and undivided heritage of the universal Church.

In June 1999 the Council of Hierarchs of the Byzantine Metropolitan Church Sui Iuris of Pittsburgh USA promulgated the norms of particular law to govern itself. In January 2007, the Revised Divine Liturgy of St. John Chrysostom and the Revised Divine Liturgy of St. Basil the Great were promulgated. In December 2013, the Pope approved the request of the Congregation for the Eastern Churches that appropriate Eastern church authorities be granted the faculty to allow pastoral service of Eastern married clergy also outside the traditional Eastern territory.

Membership within the Ruthenian Catholic Church, like the other sui iuris churches, is not limited to those who trace their heritage to the ethnic groups affiliated with the church. The Byzantine Catholic Metropolitan Church in North America puts emphasis on its American identity and celebrates the liturgy in English.

== Structure ==
As of 2016, the membership of the Ruthenian Greek Catholic Church was estimated at some 419,500 faithful, with seven bishops, 664 parishes, 557 priests, 76 deacons, and 192 men and women religious. The church is not organised as a single synod. This is mainly because some of the priests and faithful of the Eparchy of Mukachevo desire that it should be part of the Ukrainian Greek Catholic Church. The eparchy is immediately subject to the Holy See and is dependent on the Dicastery for the Eastern Churches.

The North American jurisdiction of the Ruthenian Church, formally the Byzantine Catholic Metropolitan Church of Pittsburgh, is the only self-governing Eastern Catholic metropolitan church in the United States. Its governing body is the Council of Hierarchs under the metropolitan archbishop, consisting of bishops from each eparchy. The relationship between the three jurisdictions of the Ruthenian Church has not been clarified.

Metropolitan Archbishop William C. Skurla commissioned a video documentary commemorating the 100th anniversary of the Byzantine-Ruthenian Catholic Church in the United States. Produced by Bob and Diane Grip, "Treasury of Blessings" aired on EWTN and is now available on YouTube.

- Sui iuris (self governing)

- Metropolis of Pittsburgh

The canonical territory of the metropolis includes the whole of the United States of America and Canada. It was erected as a metropolis (archdiocese) by Pope Paul VI in 1969. The apostolic exarchate in Canada serves Slovak Greek Catholics.
- Byzantine Catholic Archeparchy of Pittsburgh (1924)
- Ruthenian Catholic Eparchy of Passaic (1963)
- Ruthenian Catholic Eparchy of Parma (1969)
- Ruthenian Catholic Eparchy of the Holy Protection of Mary of Phoenix (1981)
- Exarchate of Saints Cyril and Methodius of Toronto (2022)

- Immediately subject to the Holy See

- Greek Catholic Eparchy of Mukachevo in Ukraine (1771)
- Apostolic Exarchate of the Greek Catholic Church in the Czech Republic (1996)

=== Current hierarchy of the church ===
The present Ruthenian Greek Catholic episcopate (8 hierarchs as per 28 January 2025) is as follows:

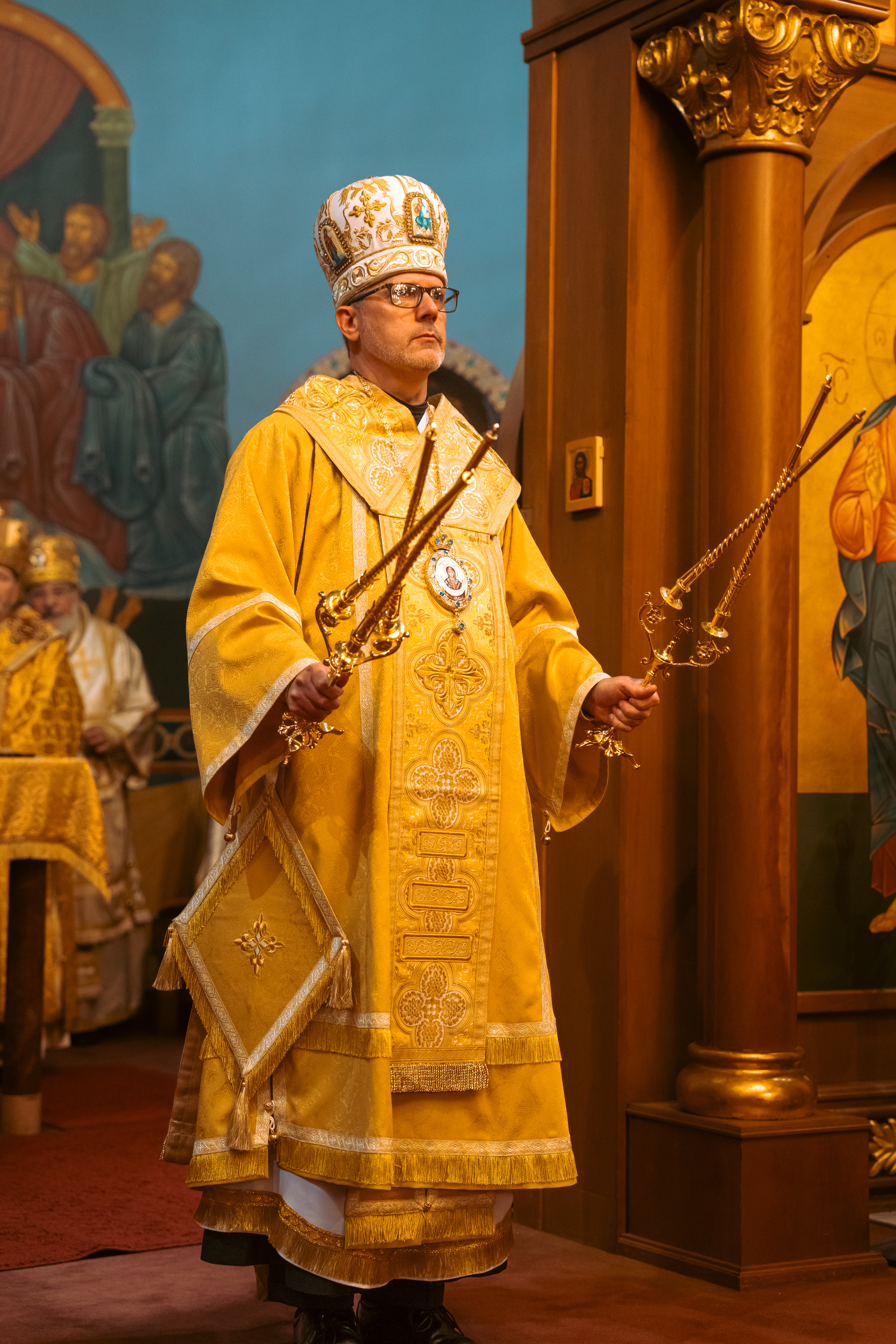
Robert Mark Pipta, Bishop of Parma

Metropolitan archbishop

- William C. Skurla, Metropolitan Archbishop of Pittsburgh (since 2012)

Eparchial bishops

- Kurt Burnette, Bishop of Passaic (since 2013)
- Robert Mark Pipta, Bishop of Parma (since 2023)
- Teodor Matsapula, IVE, Bishop of Mukachevo (since 2024)
- Artur Bubnevych, Bishop of Holy Protection of Mary of Phoenix (since 2024)

Auxiliary bishop

- Nil Lushchak, OFM, Titular Bishop of Flenucleta, Auxiliary Bishop of Mukachevo (since 2011)

Emeritus hierarchs

- John Michael Kudrick, Bishop Emeritus of Parma (since 2016)
- John Stephen Pazak, CSsR, Bishop Emeritus of Holy Protection of Mary of Phoenix (since 2021)

== Saints ==
- Blessed Theodore Romzha, bishop and martyr
- Blessed Teresa Demjanovich, nun
- Blessed Petro Pavlo Oros, auxiliary bishop and martyr

== See also ==
- History of Christianity in Ukraine
- Ruthenian Catholic Church (disambiguation)
- Slovak Greek Catholic Church
- Synod of Polotsk
- Union of Brest

People

- Andy Warhol
- Steve Ditko
- Dasha Nekrasova
