= Mágocsy =

Mágocsy is a Hungarian surname. Historically, one notable Mágocsy family were landed gentry with extensive holdings in Rusyn-inhabited Subcarpathian Rus' and neighboring territory. Alternate forms include Magocsy and Magocsi.

Individuals having this surname include:

- Paul Robert Magocsi, American historian
