= Rusyn flag =

Rusyn flag
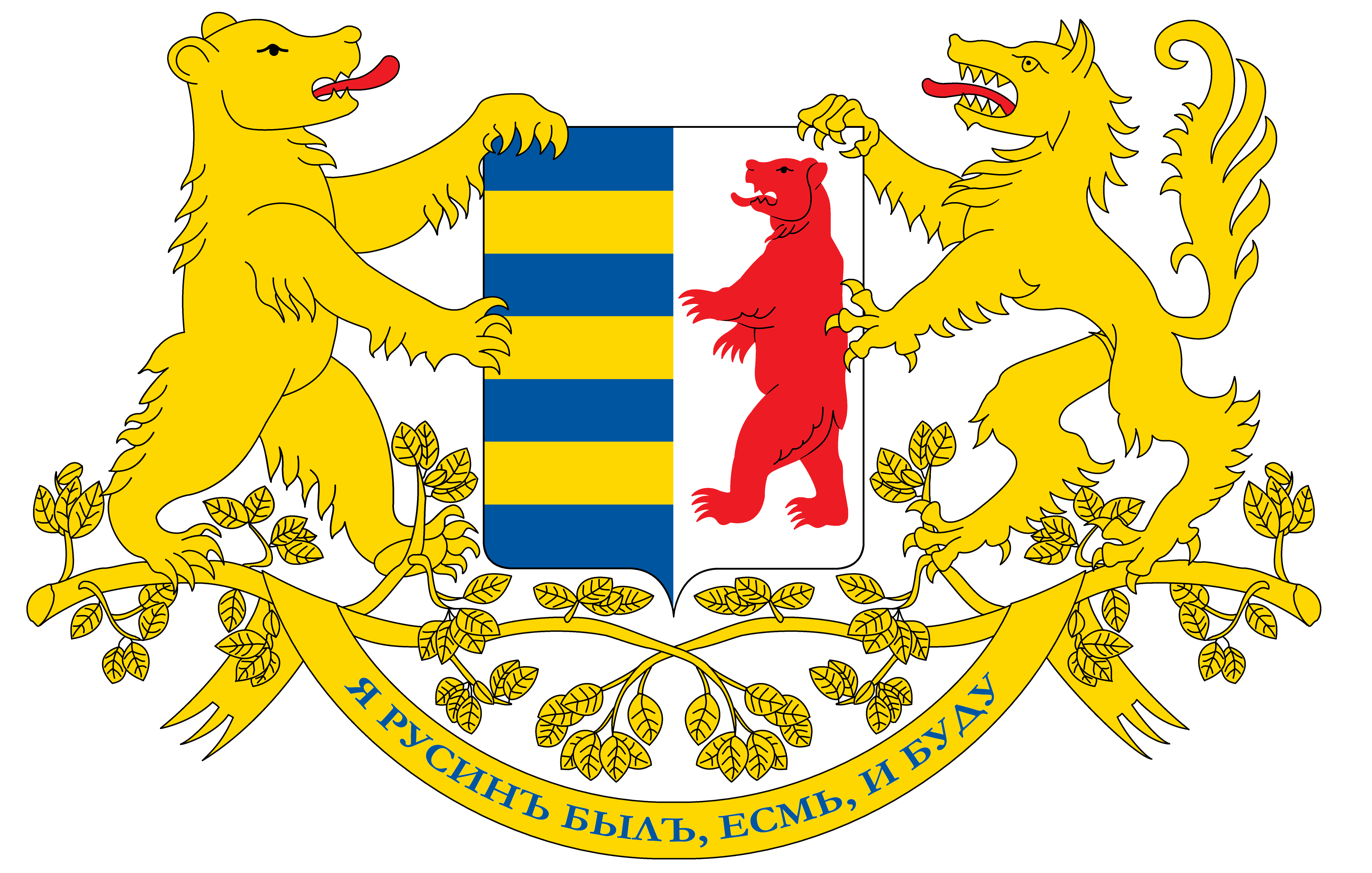
- Flag of Rusyns, approved by the World Congress of Rusyns in 2007 (Note: The blue represents the deep skies, a perspective representation of the Carpathian Mountains, hope for a better future, the colour of rational reasoning, freshness of the spirit and the body and undying diligence. The white represents traditional peacefulness, hospitability, kindness, tolerance, peace, moral and physical purity, high culture and the natural pacifism of Rusyns. The red represents all that lives and is beautiful, with the aesthetic ideal of Rusyns, and it symbolises energy and health in man.) The Rusyn coat of arms, based on the coat of arms of Subcarpathian Rus (Note: The red bear represents the Carpathian Mountains and the three gold bars the region's three major rivers: Uzh, Tysa and Latorytsia. Dark blue and gold are the region's traditional heraldic colors.) The Greater coat of arms of Rusyns, approved by the World Congress of Rusyns in 2023 (Note: The heraldic motto reads "I was, am, and will be a Rusyn")

Rusyn flag is a flag that represents the Rusyn culture. It was approved by the World Congress of Rusyns in 2007.

== Design ==
According to the Academy of Rusyn Culture in Slovakia, the blue "represents the deep skies, a perspective representation of the Carpathian Mountains, hope for a better future, the color of rational reasoning, freshness of the spirit and the body and undying diligence. The white represents traditional peacefulness, hospitability, kindness, tolerance, peace, moral and physical purity, high culture and the natural pacifism of Rusyns. The red represents all that lives and is beautiful, with the aesthetic ideal of Rusyns, and it symbolizes energy and health in man".

The flag contains the Rusyn coat of arms. The Rusyn coat of arms is based on the coat of arms of Subcarpathian Rus. The red bear represents the Carpathian Mountains and the three gold bars the region's three major rivers: Uzh, Tysa and Latorytsia. Dark blue and gold are the region's traditional heraldic colors. The Greater coat of arms of Rusyns, approved by the World Congress of Rusyns in 2023. The heraldic motto reads "I was, am, and will be a Rusyn".

The Rusyn Coat of arms is found on the flag of Zakarpattia Oblast. It can also be seen on the entrance to Uzhhorod Castle.

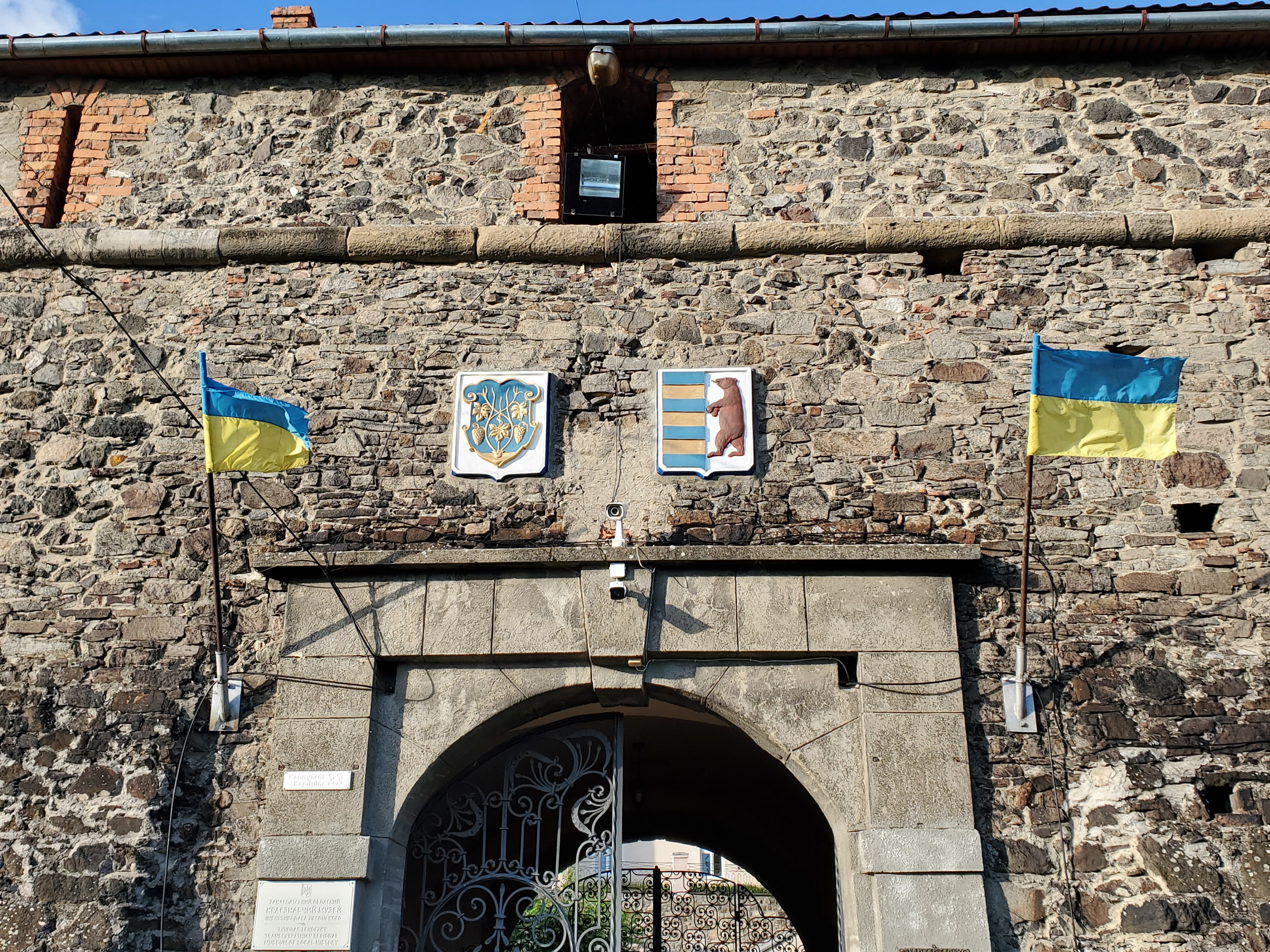
Rusyn coat of arms on the Uzhhorod Castle entrance
