= Rusyns =

East Slavic ethnic group

- The Rusyn flag, approved by the World Congress of Rusyns in 2007.

- Carpathian Rus, the homeland of the Rusyns

Total population
- est. 1,762,500 (c. 2012)

Regions with significant populations
- Ukraine: est. 853,000 (c. 2012)
- United States: est. 620,000 (c. 2012)
- Slovakia: est. 130,000 (c. 2012)
- Romania: est. 35,000 (c. 2012)
- Poland: est. 30,000 (c. 2012)
- Serbia: est. 20,000 (c. 2012)
- Canada: est. 20,000 (c. 2012)
- Czech Republic: est. 10,000 (c. 2012)
- Hungary: est. 6,000 (c. 2012)
- Croatia: est. 5,000 (c. 2012)
- Australia: est. 2,500 (c. 2012)

Languages
- Rusyn; Pannonian Rusyn; Russian; Ukrainian; Slovak; Polish; Serbian; Hungarian; Romanian

Religion
- Majority Eastern Catholic (Ruthenian Greek Catholic); Minority Eastern Orthodox, Roman Catholic

Related ethnic groups
- Other East Slavs (particularly Ukrainians)
- While it is estimated that there are around 1.7 million Rusyns, only about 110,000 people self-identified as Rusyn in national censuses (c. 2012). For this reason, the population data used are estimates rather than official figures.

Rusyns, (Note: Rusyn: Русины, romanized: Rusynŷ.) also known as Carpatho-Rusyns, (Note: Rusyn: Карпаторусины or Карпатьскы Русины, romanized: Karpatorusynŷ or Karpaťskŷ Rusynŷ.) Carpatho-Russians, Ruthenians, or Rusnaks, (Note: Rusyn: Руснакы or Руснаци, romanized: Rusnakŷ or Rusnacy.) are an East Slavic ethnic group native to the Eastern Carpathians of Central and Eastern Europe. They speak Rusyn, an East Slavic language variety variously treated as either a distinct language or a dialect of Ukrainian. The majority of Rusyns are Eastern Catholics, although a minority practices Eastern Orthodoxy.

Rusyns primarily self-identify as a distinct ethnic group and are recognized as such in all countries where they exist, with the exception of Ukraine, which officially classifies Rusyns as a sub-group of Ukrainians. In Croatia, Hungary, Poland, Romania, Serbia, and Slovakia, Rusyns have official minority status. Some Rusyns identify more closely with their country of residence (e.g. Polish, Slovak), while others self-identify as a branch of the Ukrainian people, which is a consequence of 40 years of Ukrainization since Stalin's time. According to historian Paul Robert Magocsi, after 1945 Communist authorities applied a Soviet policy that treated Carpatho-Rusyns as a branch of the Ukrainian nationality and Rusyn as a dialect of Ukrainian; he writes that Rusyn nationality and language were banned under Communist rule.

Rusyns are descended from an East Slavic population that inhabited the northeastern regions of the Eastern Carpathians. In those regions, there are several Rusyn groups, including Dolinyans, Boykos, Hutsuls and Lemkos. Since the Revolutions of 1989 toward the end of the 20th century, there has been a revival in Rusyn culture and identity. Of the estimated 1.7 million people of Rusyn origin, only around 110,000 have been officially identified as such in recent (c. 2012) national censuses.

== Ethnonyms ==
The term Rusyn (Rusyn: Русин, plural Русины, Rusynŷ) originates from the archaic ethnonym "Rus'". The respective endonymic adjective has traditionally been rusʹkŷi (руськый m., руська f., руське/руськое n.), though rusynʹskŷi (русиньскый, русинськый, русинский, русиньскій, русински) has also been used; even more so after 1989. In interwar Czechoslovakia, Ruthenia was called Rusinsko in Czech; sometimes rendered Rusinia or Rusynia in American-Rusyn publications.

=== Regional Identifiers ===
Carpatho-Rusyn or Carpatho-Ruthenian (Karpato-Rusyny) is the main regional designation for Rusyns, especially in North America. The term refers to Carpathian Ruthenia (Karpatsʹka Rusʹ), which is a historical cross-border region encompassing Subcarpathian Rus' (in northeastern Slovakia and Ukraine's Zakarpattia Oblast), Prešov Region (in eastern Slovakia), the Lemko Region (in southeastern Poland), and Maramureş (in north-central Romania). In the Lemko region, the endonym Lemko (pl. Lemkŷ) became more common in the twentieth century, along with Lemko-Rusyn since the 1990s.

The variant Rusnak (Руснак; plural: Rusnakŷ or Pannonian-Rusyn, Rusnatsi) was also (and still is) used as an endonym; particularly by Rusyns outside the Carpathians in Vojvodina, Serbia and Slavonia, Croatia. However, they may also be referred to as Vojvodinian Rusyns (voivodianski Rusnatsi), Bachka-Srem Rusyns (bachvansʹko-srimski rusnatsi), or formerly as Yugoslav Rusyns (iuzhnoslaviansʹki Rusnatsi).

Other terms such as Ruthene, Rusniak, Lemak, Lyshak, and Lemko are considered by some scholars to be historic, local, or synonymic names for these inhabitants of Transcarpathia. Others hold that the terms Lemko and Rusnak are simply regional variations for Rusyns or Ruthenes. Rusyns have at times also been referred to as Uhro-Rusyn (Uhro-Rus) in the regions of Prešov, Slovakia and Carpathian Ruthenia.

=== Carpatho-Russian ===
From the mid 1800s and well into the mid 1900s, many Catholic and Orthodox Rusyns in Europe and the United States referred to themselves as Carpatho-Russians or sometimes as Carpathian Russians. This terminology was also popular with some foreign authors and was and is still being used within the Rusyn diaspora.

For example, the popular newspaper of the Byzantine (Greek) Catholic Church in the U.S. for decades known as the ‘Greek Catholic Union Messenger’, used the term Carpatho-Russian up until the 1950s (in the 1960s the term Ruthenian briefly came into vogue).

As well, the American Carpatho-Russian Orthodox Diocese, with as of 2010 over 10,400 members and 79 parishes in the United States and Canada (and founded by former Byzantine Catholic members), still uses the term Carpatho-Russian on a regular basis.

Finally, as of the 21st Century, one can often hear Rusyn Americans within the OCA and ROCOR Orthodox churches self-identify as Carpatho-Russian, and indeed, literature of both these Orthodox bodies commonly uses the terminology Carpatho-Russian to describe Rusyns. (Note: Magocsi (2002): "[Rus'] was and in some cases still is 'translated' as Russia, with the result that Carpathian Rus' and its Rusyn inhabitants are incorrectly described as Carpatho-Russia and Carpatho-Russians. By contrast, Rusyn sources have almost always used the noun Rus' to describe all or part of the Carpathian homeland: Karpats'ka Rus', Podkarpats'ka Rus', Priashivs'ka Rus', or Uhors'ka Rus'.")

=== Ruthenian ===
Since the end of the 11th century, the exonymic term Rutheni (Ruthenes) was also used by some Latin sources of western provenance as an alternative term for all East Slavs. During the rule of the Polish-Lithuanian Commonwealth, the scope of Rutheni gradually narrowed to only refer to inhabitants of the East Slavic regions that now mostly belong to the states of Belarus and Ukraine.

After the Partitions of Poland, Rutheni "came to be associated primarily with those [East Slavs] who lived under the Habsburg monarchy" (and was used as an official designation in the Austrian Empire after 1843). In the Kingdom of Hungary, Ruthene was used as the official term for the Rusyn people (Hungarian: rutén or ruszin) of Transcarpathia until 1945. During the early twentieth century the term "became even more restricted: it was generally used to refer to the inhabitants of Transcarpathia and to Transcarpathian emigrants in the United States", for whom the terms Rusyn and Carpatho-Rusyn are more commonly used since the 1970s.

In some non-Slavic languages, Rusyns may be referred to by exonymic or somewhat archaic terms such as Carpatho-Ruthenes or Carpatho-Ruthenians, but such terminology is not present in the Rusyn language. Exonymic Ruthenian designations are seen as less precise because they encompass various East Slavic groups and bear broader ethnic connotations as a result of varied historical usage.

=== Rus' ===
Several endonyms such as Rus' and Rusyn were used widely by the East Slavs of Kievan Rus' during the medieval period. Common endonymic use of those terms continued through the life of the Polish–Lithuanian Commonwealth. Parallel, medieval Latin terms such as Rusi, Russi or Rusci are found in sources of the period and were commonly used as an exonym for the East Slavs.

== History ==
=== Origins ===
There are different theories to explain Rusyn origins. According to Paul Robert Magocsi, the origin of the present-day Carpatho-Rusyns is complex and not exclusively related to the Kievan Rus'. The ancestors were the early Slavs whose movement to the Danubian Basin was influenced by the Huns and Pannonian Avars between the 5th and 6th centuries, the White Croats who lived on both slopes of the Carpathians and built many hill-forts in the region including Uzhhorod ruled by the mythical ruler Laborec, the Rusyns of Galicia and Podolia, and Vlach shepherds of Transylvania. It is thought that the Croats were part of the Antes tribal polity who migrated to Galicia in the 3rd-4th century, under pressure by invading Huns and Goths. George Shevelov also considered a connection with East Slavic tribes, more specifically, the Hutsuls, and possibly Boykos, argued to be the descendants of the Ulichs who were not native in the region. As the region of the Ukrainian Carpathians, including Zakarpattia and Prykarpattia, has since the Early Middle Ages been inhabited by the tribes of Croats, in Ukrainian encyclopedias and dictionaries, and the Great Russian Encyclopedia, the Rusyns are generally considered to be the descendants of the White Croats.

==== Anthropology ====
According to anthropological studies, the Eastern Carpathian population makes one of the sub-regional clines of the Ukrainian population, which can be regionally divided into Eastern and Western Carpathian variants. In the study by M. S. Velikanova (1975), the skulls from a medieval necropolis near the village of Vasyliv in Zastavna Raion were very similar to the contemporary Carpathian population, and according to S. P. Segeda, V. Dyachenko and T. I. Alekseyeva this anthropological complex developed in the Middle Ages or earlier, as descendants of the medieval Slavs of Galicia and carriers of Chernyakhov culture along Prut-Dniester rivers, possibly with some Thracian component. According to the data, the population has the lowest admixture in Ukraine of Turkic speaking populations, like Volga Tatars and Bashkirs, while in comparison to other populations they have similarities with neighbouring Eastern Slovaks, Gorals of Poland, Romanians, some groups of Czechs and Hungarians, Northwestern Bulgarians, Central and Northern Serbians, and most Croatians.

==== Population genetics ====
The 2006 mitochondrial DNA study of Carpathian Highlanders – Boykos, Hutsuls and Lemkos people – showed a common ancestry with other modern Europeans. A 2009 mitochondrial DNA study of 111 samples found that in comparison to eight other Central and Eastern European populations (Belarusian, Croatian, Czech, Hungarian, Polish, Romanian, Russian, Ukrainian), the three Rusyn groups have a greater distance between themselves than these populations, with Boykos showing the greatest distance from all and did not cluster with anyone because have atypically low frequencies of haplogroup H (20%) and J (5%) for a European population, while Lemkos are closest to the Czech and Romanian (0.17) population, and Hutsuls closest to the Croatian (0.11) and Ukrainian (0.16) population.

The 2014 Y-DNA studies of 200 Pannonian Rusyns in the region of Vojvodina, Serbia, found they mostly belong to haplogroup R1a (43%), I2 (20%), E-V13 (12.5%), and R1b (8.5%), while I1, G2a, J2b, N1 between 2.5 and 4.5%, and J1, T, and H only in traces of less than 1%. They cluster closest to the Ukrainian and Slovak population, "providing evidence for their genetic isolation from the Serbian majority population". The 2015 Y-DNA study of 150 men from Zakarpattia and Chernivtsi Oblast (Bukovina), found they mostly belong to R1a1a1*(М198), I2a (Р37.2), R1a1a1 (М458) ranging around and less than 30%, with E1b1b1a1 (M78), R1b1b2 (M269), and I1 (М253) ranging between 4-14%. The sampled population is most similar to other Ukrainians, while the Bukovina population slightly "differs from the typical Ukrainian population" because it has the highest percentage of I2a (>30%) and the lowest percentage of R1a (30%) in Ukraine. Bukovina's percentage of I2 is similar to near Moldovan and Romanian population, while the highest percentage is among South Slavs in Western Balkans. It was concluded that although bordered by diverse nations, the Carpathians seemingly were a barrier decreasing gene flow southward of N1c (М178), R1a (М198) from the region, and northward of E1b (М78), R1b (М269), J (М304) and G (М201) to the region.

=== Early history ===
The general usage of 'Rusyn' by East Slavs dates back to over 11 centuries, its origin signifying the ethnic tie to the political entity of Kievan Rus', which existed from the late ninth to the early 13th century. The East Slavs mixed with other peoples over centuries, including in the south with Iranian and later with Germanic peoples, in the west with Baltic peoples, in the east with Finnish and Turkic peoples.

Over the centuries these loosely affiliated peoples developed different political and economic centers as well as new names. By the 18th century, official names used by the Russian Empire were Great Russians (modern Russians), Little Russians (modern Ukrainians), and White Russians (modern Belarusians). By the mid-20th century, the original name Rus or Rusyn was retained only in the Carpathian Mountains.

Rusyns settled in the Carpathian Mountain region in various waves of immigration from the north between the eighth and 17th centuries. Weapons and skeletons found in tombs in Bereg County from the 10th century era suggest that Norman Vikings (who played a role in the founding of Kiev Rus') were there as well. Even so, as late as the 11th century, this mountainous area was still a sparsely inhabited 'No-Man's Land' border between the kingdoms of Kievan Rus' and Hungary.

In 1241, the Carpathians fell to Mongol invasions led by Genghis Khan's grandson, Batu Khan, with populations exterminated and villages torched. The Mongols entered the region via the Veretski Pass, just to the north of Mukachevo.

In 1396, exiled Prince Theodor Koriatovich, member of the Lithuanian House of Gediminas, purchased the city of Mukachevo, settling himself in the city's Palanok Castle. He might have facilitated the migration of up to 40,000 from Podolia but the number is disputed. The arrival of Koriatovich and his retinue was a milestone for the Rusyns, substantially improving the region's administrative, ecclesiastical and cultural aspects. This included building and fortifying Mukachevo Castle with cannons, a moat, workers and artisans, and the founding of an Orthodox monastery on the Latorytsia River.

=== Modern history ===
The Austro-Hungarian monarchy controlled the Carpathians from 1772 to 1918. With the increased Magyarization in the nineteenth century, for some educated and intellectual Rusyns it was natural to move to Budapest, while for other Slavic minded intellectuals the Russian Empire became a favored destination.

The Rusyns have always been subject to larger neighboring powers, but in the 19th century a Rusyn national movement was formed which emphasized distinct ethnic identity and literary language. During the Spring of Nations on 2 May 1848 in Lemberg (today Lviv) was established the first political representation of the Galician Rusyns, the Main Ruthenian Council (Rusyn: Головна Руська Рада, Holovna Ruska Rada). The most active and leading stratum among Rusyns was Greek-Catholic clergy (see Greek Catholic Eparchy of Mukachevo, Ruthenian Greek Catholic Church, a successor of Ecclesia Ruthena unita).

The nineteenth century also saw the spread of pan Slavism in Europe, and a pro-Moscow view became popular. The Russian military campaign of Tsar Nicholas I through the Carpathians in 1849 had significance for the local Rusyn population, who came into close contact with an almost 200,000 man Russian army. This interaction had an impact on the rising national consciousness of that time. Aleksander Dukhnovich (1803–1865), who wrote the unofficial Rusyn National Anthem ("I was, am, and will be a Rusyn"), and who by some is considered to be a sort of 'George Washington' of the Rusyns, reminisced that when he saw the Russian Cossacks on the streets, he "danced and cried with joy".

A few decades later, when economic conditions and repression worsened in the late 19th century, massive emigration of Rusyns to America took place, beginning in the early 1870s. Between 1899 and 1931, Ellis Island listed 268,669 Rusyn immigrants. Most settled in the northeastern states, but Rusyn settlements also appeared in more far flung states such as Minnesota, Colorado, Alabama, Washington and Montana. Smaller numbers also emigrated to Canada, Brazil and Argentina.

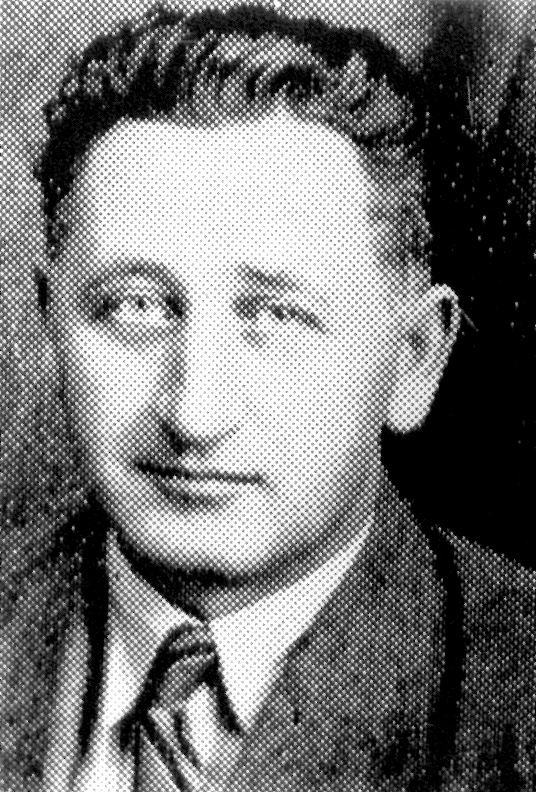
Stepan Klochurak

Rusyns formed two ephemeral states after World War I: the Lemko-Rusyn Republic and Komancza Republic. Prior to this time, some of the founders of the Lemko-Rusyn Republic were sentenced to death or imprisoned in Talerhof by the prosecuting attorney Kost Levytsky (Rusyn: Кость Леви́цький), future president of the West Ukrainian People's Republic. In the interwar period, the Rusyn diaspora in Czechoslovakia enjoyed liberal conditions to develop their culture (in comparison with Ukrainians in Poland or Romania). Hutsul Stepan Klochurak was a prime minister of Hutsul Republic centered in Yasinia that was seeking union with the West Ukrainian People's Republic, but was overrun by the Hungarian troops, later Klochurak became a Defense Minister of Carpatho-Ukraine.

After World War I, the majority of Rusyns found themselves in the new country of Czechoslovakia. The interwar period became a mini renaissance for Rusyn culture, as they were permitted their own schools, theater, anthem, and even their own governor.

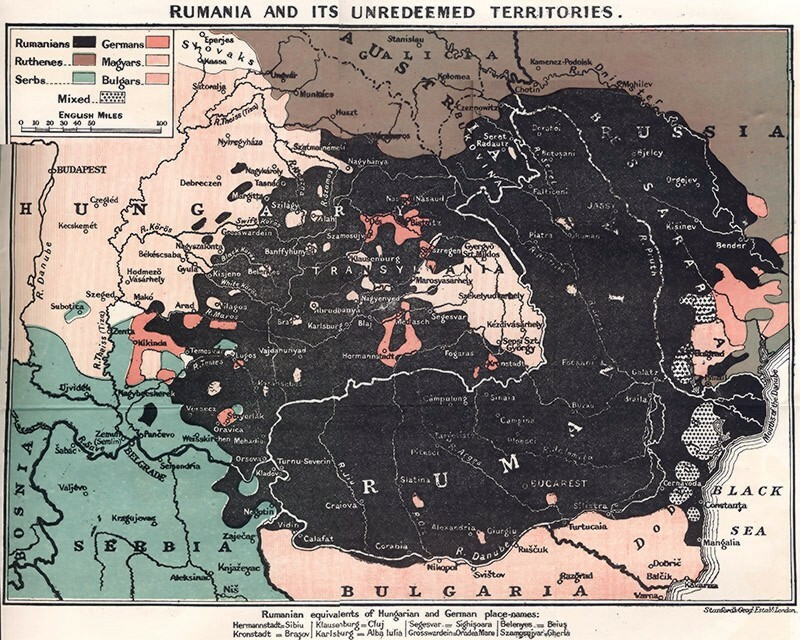
Map of territories occupied by Ruthenes in the Carpathian region near Huszt, Munkács, Ungvár

During the Dissolution of Austro-Hungarian Monarchy (1918), various parts of Rusyn people were faced with different political challenges. Those who lived in northeastern counties of the Hungarian part of the former Monarchy were faced with pretensions of Hungary, Romania, and Czechoslovakia. On the other hand, those who lived in the former Kingdom of Galicia and Lodomeria were faced with pretensions of Poland and Ukraine.

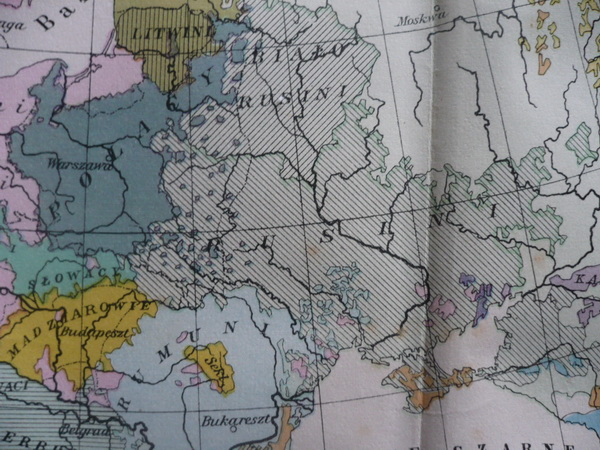
Polish map of 1927 indicating location of Rusyns and Ukrainians (labelled Rusini) and Belarusians (Bialo Rusini)

In the 1920s and 1930s a dispute existed between Russophile and Ukrainophile Rusyns. In October 1938, a series of political reforms were initiated, leading to the creation of the Second Czechoslovak Republic, consisting of three autonomous political entities, one of them being the Subcarpathian Rus' (Rusyn: Підкарпатьска Русь). On 11 October 1938, first autonomous Government of Subcarpathian Rus was appointed, headed by prime-minister Andrej Bródy. Soon after, a crisis occurred between pro-Rusyn and pro-Ukrainian fractions, leading to the fall of Bródy government on 26 October. New regional government, headed by Avgustyn Voloshyn, adopted a pro-Ukrainian course and opted for the change of name, from Subcarpathian Rus' to Carpathian Ukraine.

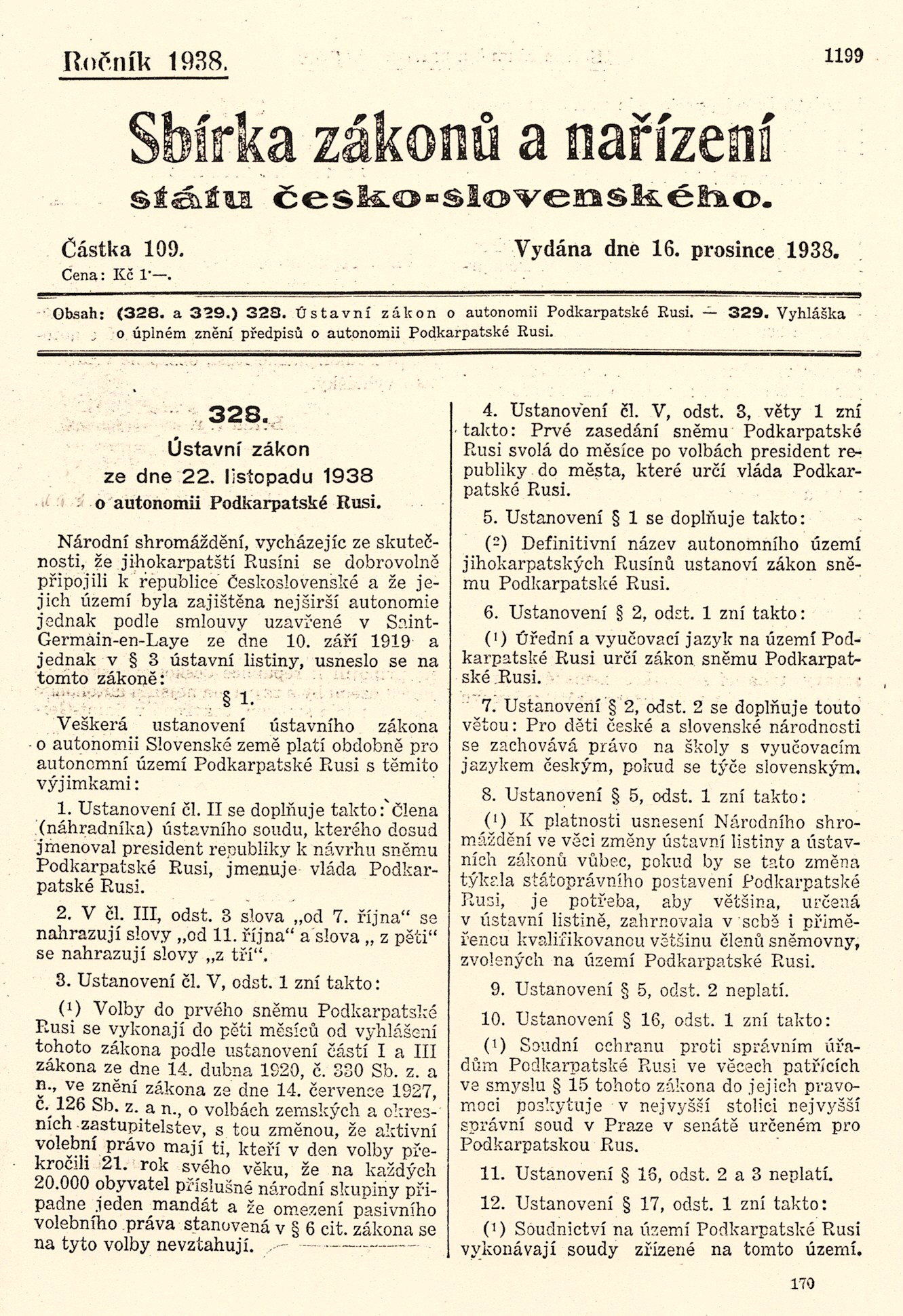
Constitutional Law on the Autonomy of Subcarpathian Rus' (1938)

That move led to the creation of a particular terminological duality. On 22 November 1938, authorities of the Second Czechoslovak Republic proclaimed the Constitutional Law on the Autonomy of Subcarpathian Rus' (Czech: Ústavní zákon o autonomii Podkarpatské Rusi), officially reaffirming the right of self-determination of Rusyn people (preamble), and confirming full political and administrative autonomy of Subcarpathian Rus', with its own assembly and government. In the constitutional system of the Second Czechoslovak Republic, the region continued to be known as the Subcarpathian Rus', while local institutions promoted the use of the term Carpathian Ukraine.

Carpatho-Ukraine in 1939

The Republic of Carpatho-Ukraine, which existed for one day on March 15, 1939, before it was occupied and annexed by Hungary, is sometimes considered to have been a self-determining Rusyn state that had intentions to unite with Kiev. The Republic's president, Avgustyn Voloshyn, was an advocate of writing in Rusyn. The Hungarian annexation caused support for Russophile direction, while in Germany occupied Poland support for Ukrainian identity.

Although the Carpathians were not a major WWII battlefield, the Rusyns saw their share of horror and destruction, beginning with the Hungarian government's 1941 deportation of the Carpathian Jews. In September 1944, while retreating from a Soviet Red Army offensive, the Nazis who were passing through blew up all the bridges in Uzhhorod, including one built in the 14th century.

On 26 November 1944 in Mukachevo representatives from all cities and villages of the land adopted the manifesto uniting Zakarpattia Ukraine with Soviet Ukraine.

The Soviets occupied the Carpathians, and in 1945 the Rusyn ethnic homeland was split among three countries, as western portions were incorporated into Czechoslovakia and Poland, while the eastern portion became part of the Soviet Union and was officially named Transcarpathia. After World War II, Transcarpathia was declared as a part of Ukraine.

In Poland, the new Communist government deported many Rusyns from their ancestral region, sending many east to Ukraine, and others to the far west of the country. In Czechoslovakia, a policy of Ukrainization was implemented. In Ukraine, many Rusyns who owned land or livestock, often funded via their own family members in America, were now branded by the Soviets as kulaks, or rich peasants. Property and farm animals were confiscated and newly established kolkhozes (collectivized farms) were built, with people being forced to work on their own former land, 'employed' by the Communist government. Some of the less lucky were sent to Siberia.

In 1947, under the Operation Vistula c. 150,000 Lemkos, Boykos and (other) Ukrainians were forcibly resettled between Poland and Ukraine. In the same time some 8,500 Rusyns voluntarily emigrated from Czechoslovakia to Ukraine, but more than half of them returned during the 1960s.

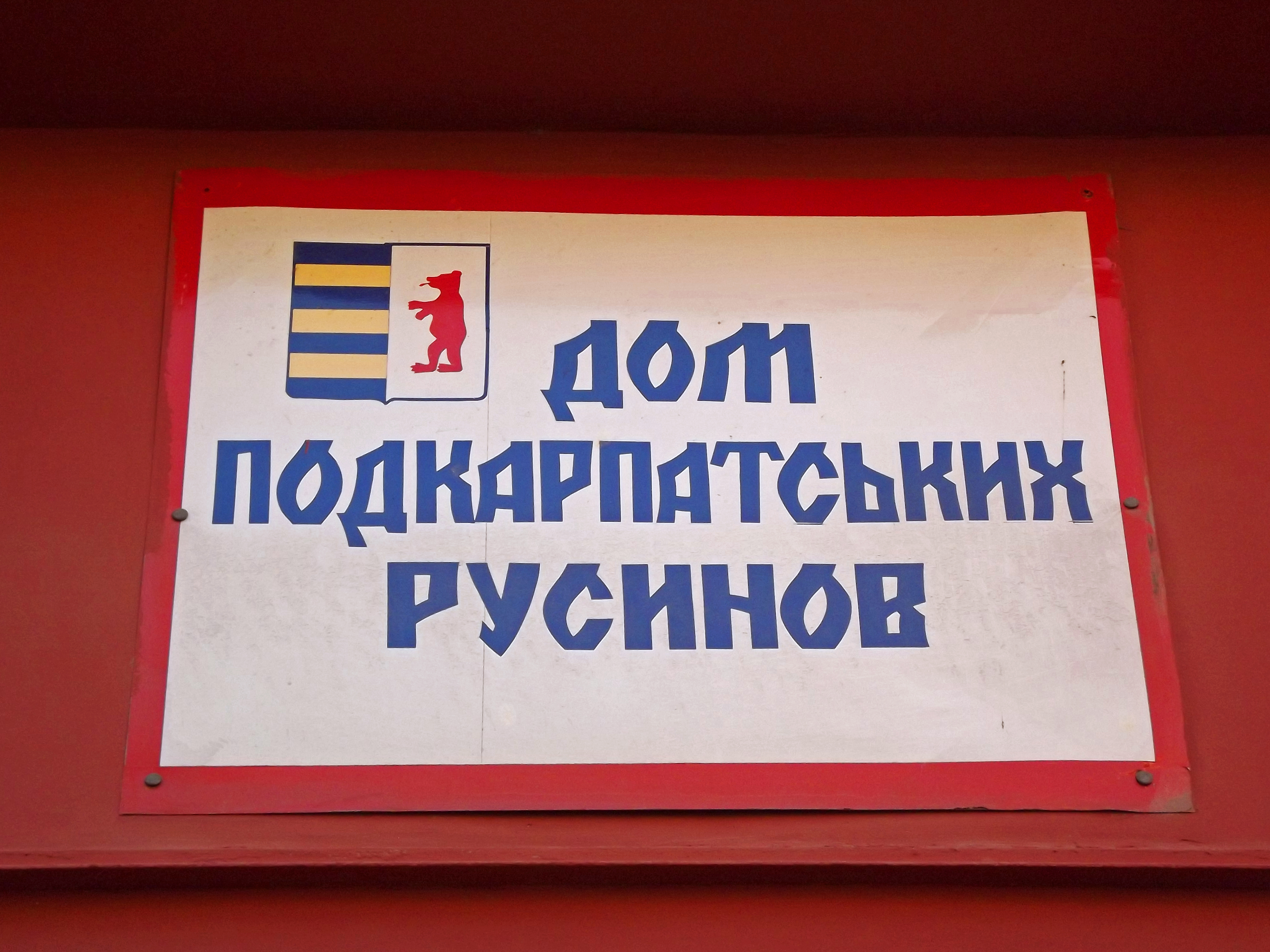
Sign reads "House of Subcarpathian Rusyns" (Dom Podkarpatskikh Rusinov) in Mukachevo

These acts were protested for years, but to no avail. In the US, the Greek Catholic Union's 1964 convention even adopted a resolution calling on the United Nations to act "so that Carpatho-Russia be recognized and accepted into the free nations of the world as an autonomous state".

In former Yugoslavia, Rusyns were officially recognized as a distinct national minority, and their legal status was regulated in Yugoslav federal units of Serbia and Croatia. In the Constitution of Serbia, that was adopted in 1963, Rusyns were designated as one of seven (explicitly named) national minorities (Article 82), and the same provision was implemented in the Statute of the Autonomous Province of Vojvodina that was adopted in the same year (Article 32). Further on, the Constitutional Law of 1969 regulated the position of Rusyn language as one of five official languages in Vojvodina (Article 67).

=== Recent history ===
After the fall of communism, new opportunities arose for Rusyns in Poland and in the newly formed countries of Slovakia and Ukraine. The Rusyns of the Transcarpathia region of Ukraine were able to vote in December 1991 for self-rule. With an 89% voter turnout, 78% voted Yes to autonomy. But with the Russian majority in the Odessa region casting a similar vote, the Ukrainian government, fearing secession, has refused to honor this referendum.

In terms of minority rights, the question of Rusyn self-identification and recognition in Ukraine has been a subject of interest for European institutions, as well as the United Nations. Nationally, Rusyns are considered (by both state and cultural authorities) only a sub-group of the Ukrainian people. In spite of this, Ukraine's Zakarpattia Oblast has recognized Rusyns as a "distinct nationality" within the oblast since a 2007 proclamation by its regional assembly.

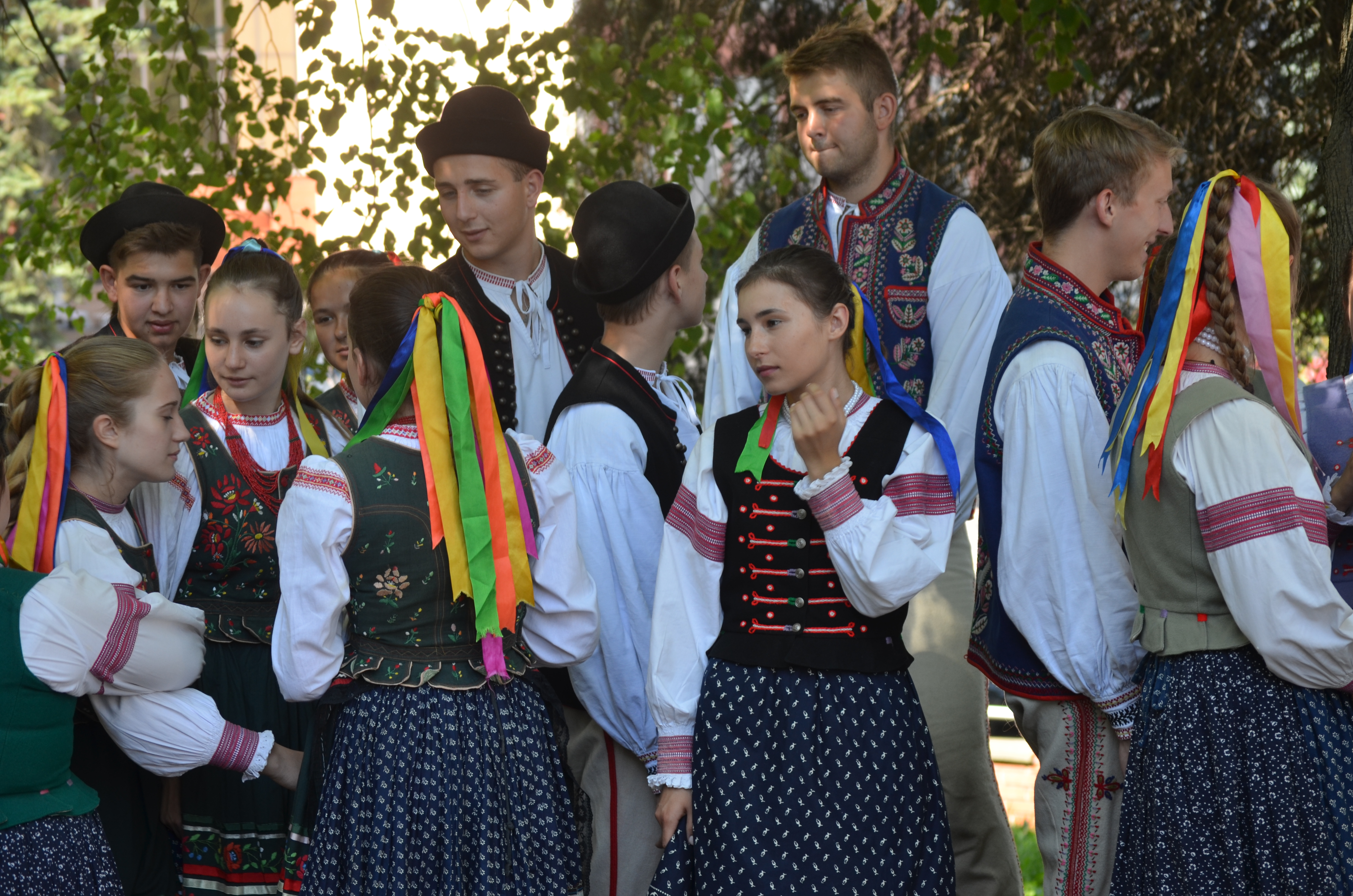
Lemkos in southeastern Poland

By the end of the 20th century, many societies and organizations appeared, of which considered Rusyns to be of a distinct and separate people from Ukrainians. By the early 21st century they had representatives in parliaments of Serbia, Hungary, and Romania, published their own press, and in 2007 the Museum of Ruthenian Culture was opened in Prešov, Slovakia.

In 2010 there were festivities in Mukachevo commemorating the union of Zakarpattia with Ukraine. Four out of 663 of the congressional delegates who adopted the manifesto (which called for the union of Zakarpattia with Ukraine), and of who were still alive, attended the event. They were: F. Sabov, O. Lohoida, M. Moldavchuk, and J. Matlakh. They shared their experience about the first years of the People's Council in the revival of the region.

There is also ongoing linguistic and political controversy as to whether Rusyn is a distinct Slavic language or one of several dialects of the Ukrainian language. In several countries, it is recognized as a distinct minority language. Ukraine also adopted a law that recognized Rusyn as one of several minority and regional languages in 2012, though that law was revoked in 2014.

In 2021 while discussing the borders of modern Ukraine, Russian President Vladimir Putin specifically referred to the people in the Carpathian Mountains of modern-day Ukraine as Rusyns, rather than Ukrainians. In writing about the Soviet Union's post World War II takeover of the Transcarpathian region, Putin stated that, "quote, 'Rusyns (Русины) made up a considerable share of the local population', unquote". Then, using the pre-World War II term to describe the region, he asserted that the population of "Subcarpathian Rus", also known as Podkarpatska Rus (Подкарпатскa Рус) voted to join the Soviet Union either as "either part of the Russian Soviet republic or as a separate Carpathian republic". Putin noted however that the Soviet authorities "ignored the choice of the people" and incorporated it instead into the Ukrainian Soviet republic.

Today, it is estimated that there are approximately 1.5 million Rusyns in Europe and a healthy pro-Rusyn movement existing in the Carpathian region.

== Autonomist and separatist movements ==
According to Mrs Jozsefne Csepanyi-Bardos, the president of the Ruthenian Ethnic Minority Council in Budapest, the "flag of the Ruthenians of the World" is a tricolour in a 2:1:1 ratio.

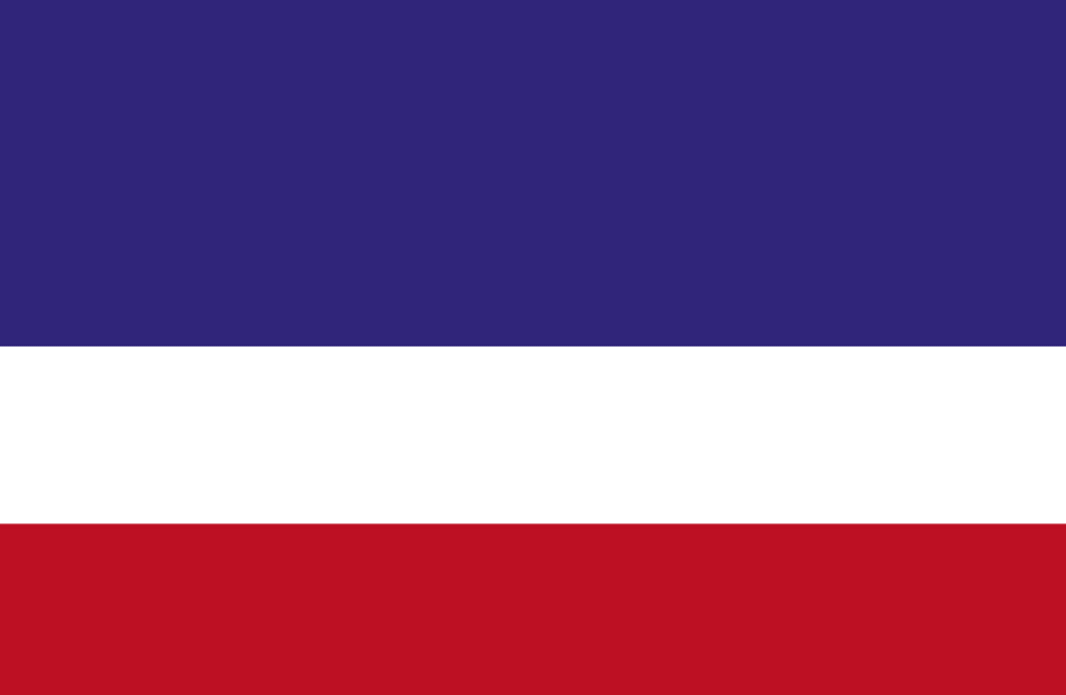

May Panchuk, a Ukrainian academic, historian, and head of the department of National Minorities of the National Academy of Sciences of Ukraine's Institute of Political and Ethno-national research, explained that soon after dissolution of the Soviet Union and during the 1991 Ukrainian referendum, there was provided additional question for Zakarpattia residents only whether they wish to obtain a self-governed territory within Ukraine. This lead Rusyns to create their own political parties and movements. By March 1992 the recently created Subcarpathian Republican Party published its program with elements sometimes described as separatism: the creation of an independent, neutral "Republic of Subcarpathian Ruthenia" on the model of Switzerland; full political and economic independence; and the recognition of Rusyn people as a full nationality among other nations. The Ukrainian newspaper Svetlovodsk asserted that the party contained "a well expressed Kremlin orientation and did not hide its connections with pro-Russians elements." In 1993, a group of separatists met in Bratislava to form what they called the "Republic of Subcarpathian Ruthenia" (RPR) with aspirations to join the Commonwealth of Independent States. Svetlovodsk also claims that the activity of the RPR was openly supported by a variety of pro-Russian organizations, including the Russkiy Mir Foundation. In December 1994 self-proclaimed Minister of Foreign Affairs T. Ondyk appealed to the President of Russia Boris Yeltsin to cancel the 1945 treaty between the Soviet Union and Czechoslovakia which formalized the union of Zakarpattia Ukraine with the Ukrainian SSR. At that same time, Ondyk appealed to the presidents of the United States and Hungary accusing the Ukrainian government of a policy of extermination of Rusyns and Hungarians.

A considerable controversy has arisen regarding the Rusyn separatist movement led by the Orthodox priest Dimitry Sydor (now Archbishop of Uzhhorod, in the Ukrainian Orthodox Church (Moscow Patriarchate)), his relationship with the Russian Orthodox Church and funding for his activities. Russia has, as of the result of the Russian census of 2002, recognized the Rusyns as a separate ethnic group in 2004, and has been accused by Ukrainian researcher Ivan Hvat of fueling ethnic tensions and separatism among Rusyns in Ukraine.

A criminal case under Part 2, Art. 110 of the Ukrainian Criminal Code was initiated after the 1st European Congress of Rusyns took place in Mukachevo on June 7, 2008. At that particular congress the reinstatement of the Zakarpattia's status as special "territory of Rusyns to the south of the Carpathians" with self-government under the constitutional name Subcarpathian Rus was recognized. On October 29, at the 2nd congress in Mukachevo, a memorandum was signed calling for the authorities to recognize the Subcarpathian Rus autonomy (by December 1). That same day, according to the Kommersant-Ukraine (Ukrainian edition) agents of the Security Service of Ukraine (SBU) questioned Dmytro Sydor and Yevgeniy Zhupan. They were summoned to SBU as witnesses in a criminal case "on the infringement on territorial integrity of Ukraine" initiated in June 2008. According to the internet publisher "Newsru", earlier in 2008 the Zakarpattia Rusyns appealed to Russia to recognize independence of Subcarpathian Ruthenia from Ukraine. In 2014, at the start of the Russo-Ukrainian War, an activist of the Subcarpathian Ruthenia movement named Petro Hetsko, who claims to be prime minister of the Subcarpathian Ruthenia, asked the President of Russia to intervene and help "neutralize Galician Nazism in Zakarpattia".

Research conducted by the University of Cambridge during the height of political Rusynism in the mid-1990s that focused on five specific regions within the Zakarpattia Oblast having the strongest pro-Rusyn cultural and political activism, found that only nine percent of the population of these areas claimed Rusyn ethnicity. In the present day, according to the Ukrainian census, most – over 99% – of the local inhabitants consider themselves to be Ukrainians. (Ukrainian census numbers inflated since 1991 refer to local ones for accuracy).

== Religion ==
=== Early history ===
Religion and Rusyn history are deeply intertwined, often resulting in controversy. Many believe that when Rusyns first came to Christianity it was through the Orthodox faith, although this has been challenged by many others who assert the initial Christian influence actually came from Catholic Moravia. One of the earliest saints of the (Orthodox) Monastery of the Caves at Kiev was the Rusyn Moses Uhrin (died 1043), who prior to becoming a monk served Boris, the prince of Ancient Rus'. Moses and his brothers Efrem and Georgii stories are recorded in the noted Primary Chronicle. Also originating from this time is the unique Carpathian church Prostopinije (Plain Chant), which is closely related to the ancient chant of Kievan Rus' and has even preserved elements of it.

For over 600 years, the Orthodox Church was the only Rusyn church in the Carpathians. But under the growing influence of the then ruling Austro-Hungarian Empire, Orthodox clergy were reduced over time to the legal status of peasant-serfs, and even the bishop of Mukachevo was at the mercy of the Hungarian lords. To improve their condition, some Orthodox priests attempted to form a new church under the Catholics. In 1614, 50 priests convened at the Krasni Brid Monastery with this intent, but a crowd of Orthodox protested and dispersed the group. A second attempt in the 1630s under Bishop Vasyl Tarasovych also failed. Finally in April 1646, Bishop Parfenii Petrovich was able to convene a meeting of 63 (out of a few hundred) priests who pledged their allegiance to the Pope of Rome. Their signed document became known as the Union of Uzhhorod, resulting in the formation of the Ukrainian Catholic Church. This new Church was given greater material assistance from the Austro-Hungarian Empire while being allowed to maintain their Eastern Rite traditions, including married priests. From that time, the Rusyns had two bishops, one Greek Catholic and one Orthodox, until 1721 when the last remaining Orthodox priests in the western counties accepted the Union. Some priests in the eastern counties of Bereg and Maramaros remained Orthodox until 1745.

=== Recent history ===
In the 1890s, 145 years after Orthodoxy had ceased to exist in the Carpathians, a so-called 'return to Orthodoxy' movement began, reaching a high point in the 1920s. Many Greek Catholics who became Orthodox were arrested for treason and a few were even executed by the government, with the Thalerhof internment camp and martyrdom (by firing squad) of the Orthodox priest Maxim Sandovich in 1914 being the best known incidents. Meanwhile, the Russian Bolshevik Revolution was forcing Russians of the nobility and middle class to flee, and many settled in the US. These Russians arrived and began joining the American Russian Orthodox Church (then called the Metropolia) at precisely the same time Carpatho-Russians in America were also 'returning' to the Orthodox faith. This mixing furthered Russophile leanings among many Rusyns. Leading the charge was Fr. Alexis Toth, a former Greek Catholic priest who led as many as 20,000 Rusyn Americans to Orthodoxy, for which he was canonized by the Orthodox Church (due to his efforts, perhaps 1/3rd of American Rusyns are Orthodox today). This American mixing further influenced events and persecutions back in the Carpathian homeland, where thousands of fleeing Orthodox Russians also settled, including monks who founded the Ladomirova Monastery. Indeed, Laurus Škurla who was born in Ladomirova (now in Slovakia) rose to become Metropolitan Laurus, the leader of the Russian Orthodox Church Outside Russia.

Conversely, it was Greek Catholics of the Carpathians who suffered in the 1940s. By force, the Soviet government annulled the Union of Uzhhorod in 1946, and the Greek Catholic Church was liquidated exactly 300 years after its formation. The Greek Catholic Cathedral, Uzhhorod was transferred to the Moscow-based Russian Orthodox Church in 1948, and priests who refused to convert to Orthodoxy were sent to the Siberian and Arctic labor camps, where many died. Others were simply murdered in their home villages. A horrific example of this was the martyrdom (by assassination) of Greek Catholic Bishop Theodore Romzha. To add salt to the wound, in 1971 the Russian Orthodox Synod of Zagorsk, U.S.S.R. indirectly justified this violence by officially ratifying the annulment.

And while no longer the case, from the early and even until the mid-1900s in America, religious and nationalist causes went together. Aside from Russian Orthodox/Greek Catholic struggle, the dislike of Ukrainians by Rusyn religious leaders was strong and expressed often, as Ukrainian nationalism was deemed a destructive force to Rusyn culture. The influential newspaper of the American Greek Catholic Church, the 'GCU Messenger', wrote in 1954: "To us Carpatho-Russian people here and in our native country under the green Carpathians, there can be no greater insult and offense then when someone calls us Ukrainians. We know not such people on the world's map."

Europe Today

In Europe today, some tensions still exist. As an example, the aforementioned Cathedral of the Exaltation of the Cross in Uzhhorod belonged to the Greek Catholics but after WWII had been given to the Russian Orthodox Church by the Communist government. With the pending fall of communism, a well-meaning visit to this cathedral in February 1990 by American Byzantine Catholic (Greek Catholic) Archbishop Stephen Kocisko, whose own Rusyn parents were born in the Carpathians, led to confrontation from Rusyn Orthodox protestors. Later in 1991, there were major protests, including physical attacks and hunger strikes when it was decided to transfer the cathedral back to the Greek Catholics.

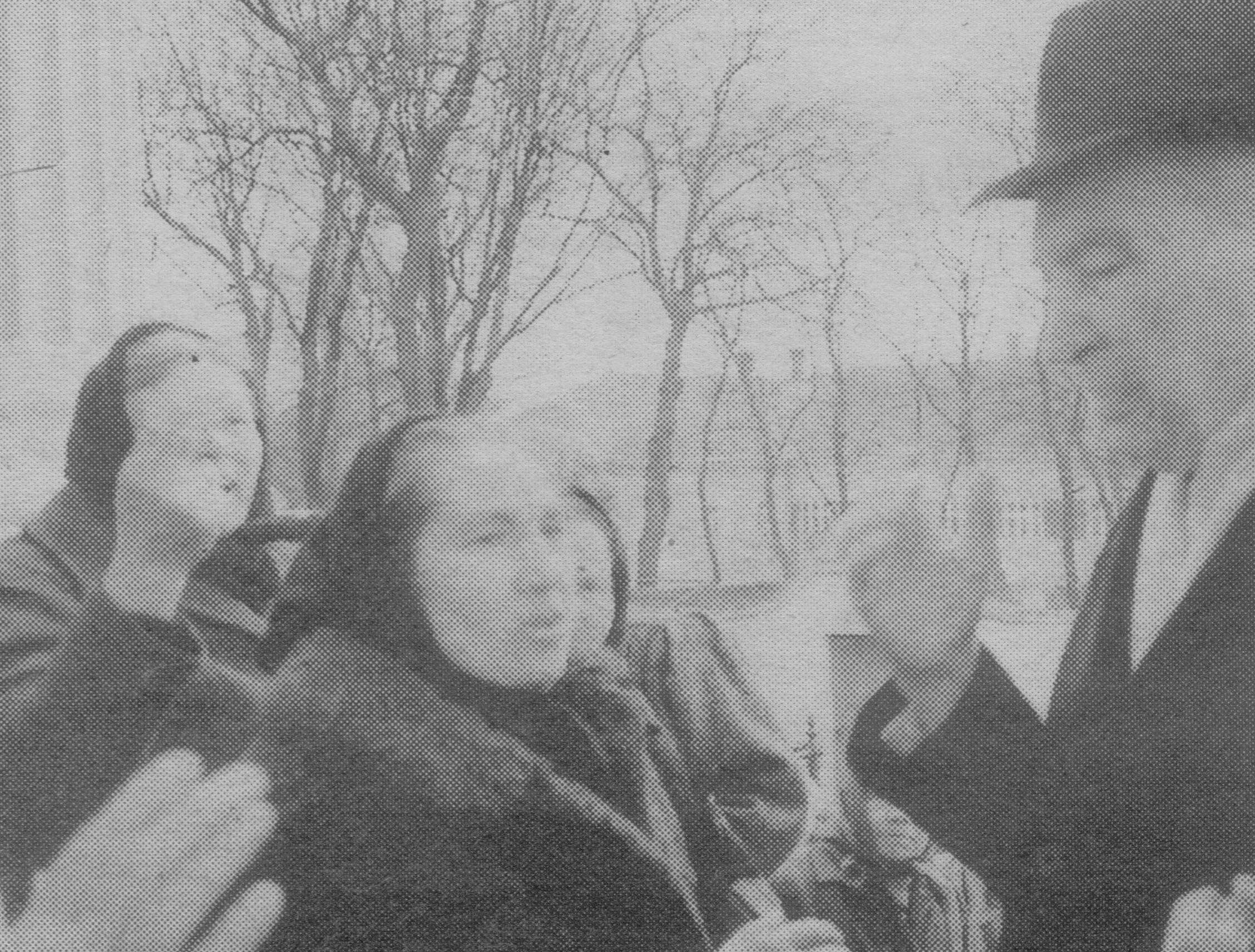
Orthodox protest Greek Catholic Archbishop Kocisko's 1990 Uzhhorod Cathedral visit.

The Orthodox immediately set about to build a new Uzhhorod Orthodox Cathedral, under the guidance of the Rusyn Fr. Dimitry Sydor, a Moscow Patriarchate priest, who is perhaps the most controversial cleric in today's Carpathians. In a nod to Moscow, the architecture of the new cathedral is based on the design of the famous and newly rebuilt Cathedral of Christ the Saviour in Moscow, which is the largest church in all of Russia.

At the parish level, numerous churches which had been forcibly Orthodox for decades switched back to the Greek Catholic jurisdiction, and new ones were also constructed. As well, in spite of continued pressure, the region's Greek Catholic Church steadfastly refuses to be included under the jurisdiction of the Ukrainian oriented Lviv Ukrainian Catholic Eparchy. Notably and in another example of Rusyns going against the tide and seen as a pushback against Ukrainianism, an estimated 542 of the existing 550 Transcarpathian Orthodox churches chose to remain under the (Russian) Moscow Patriarchate rather than join the (Ukrainian) Kiev/Kyiv Patriarchate. And as of 2021 according to the Ukrainian government itself, Transcarpathia had one of the highest adherence levels in Ukraine to the Moscow Orthodox Patriarchate rather than the Kyiv Orthodox Patriarchate.

=== Greek Catholics ===
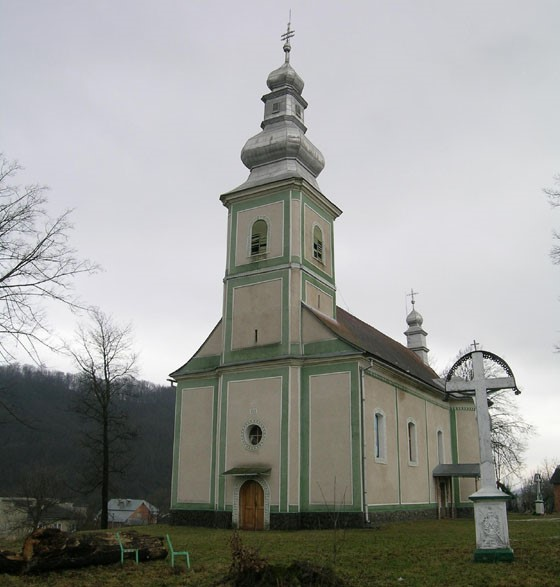
St Michael's Greek Catholic Church, Turja Pasika Transcarpathia Ukraine (built 1810)

Many Rusyns are Eastern Catholics of the Byzantine Rite, who since the Union of Uzhhorod in 1646 have been in communion with the See of Rome. This church, the Ruthenian Greek Catholic Church, is distinct from the Latin Catholic Church. It has retained the Byzantine Rite liturgy, sometimes including the Church Slavonic language, the liturgical forms of Byzantine or Eastern Orthodox Christianity, and married priests.

The Pannonian Rusyns of Croatia are organized under the Greek Catholic Eparchy of Križevci, and those in the region of Vojvodina (northern Serbia), are organized under the Greek Catholic Eparchy of Ruski Krstur, headed by bishop Đura Džudžar, who is an ethnic Rusyn. Those in the diaspora in the United States established the Byzantine Catholic Metropolitan Church of Pittsburgh.

=== Eastern Orthodox ===
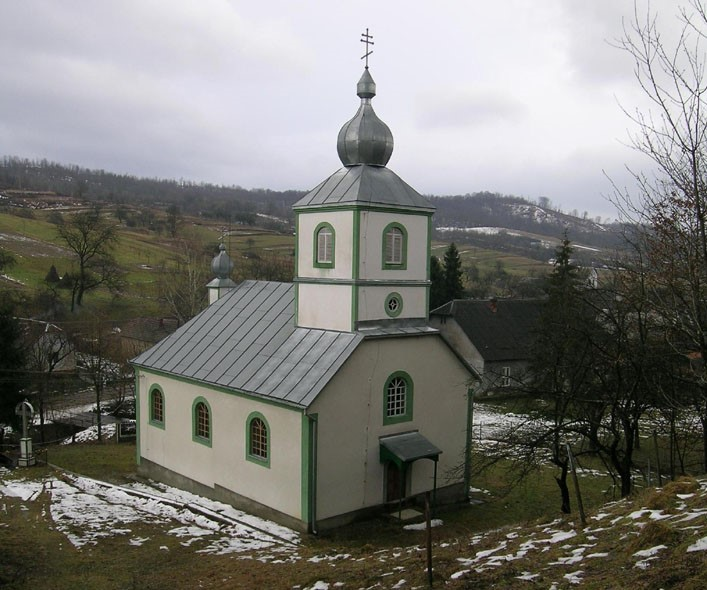
Saints Peter & Paul Orthodox Church, Mokra Transcarpathia Ukraine

Although originally associated with the Eastern Orthodox Eparchy of Mukachevo, that diocese was suppressed after the Union of Uzhhorod. New Eastern Orthodox Eparchy of Mukachevo and Prešov was created in 1931 under the auspices of the Serbian Orthodox Church. That eparchy was divided in 1945, eastern part joining Russian Orthodox Church as the Eparchy of Mukachevo and Uzhhorod, while western part was reorganized as Eastern Orthodox Eparchy of Prešov of the Czech and Slovak Orthodox Church.

Many Rusyn Americans left Catholicism for Eastern Orthodoxy in the 19th century due to disputes with the Latin Church bishops, who viewed different practices in the Byzantine Rite (such as married clergy) with suspicion.

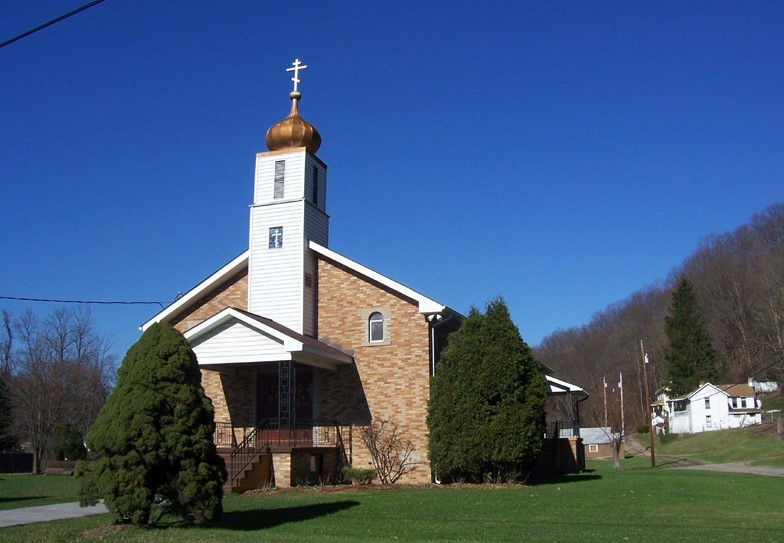
St Nicholas Carpatho-Russian Orthodox Church, Jacobs Creek Pennsylvania, USA

Another large segment of Rusyn Americans belong to the American Carpatho-Russian Orthodox Diocese, which is headquartered in Johnstown, Pennsylvania. From its early days, this group was recognized by the Ecumenical Patriarchate as a self-governing diocese.

The affiliation of Eastern Orthodox Rusyns was adversely affected by the Communist revolution in the Russian Empire and the subsequent Iron Curtain which split the Orthodox diaspora from the Eastern Orthodox believers living in the ancestral homelands. A number of émigré communities have claimed to continue the Orthodox Tradition of the pre-revolution church while either denying or minimizing the validity of the church organization operating under Communist authority.

For example, the Orthodox Church in America (OCA) was granted autocephalous (self-governing) status by the Moscow Patriarchate in 1970. Although approximately 25% of the OCA was Rusyn in the early 1980s, an influx of Eastern Orthodox émigrés from other nations and new converts wanting to connect with the Eastern Church have lessened the impact of a particular Rusyn emphasis in favor of a new American Orthodoxy.

In 1994, the historian Paul Robert Magocsi stated that there were approximately 690,000 Carpatho-Rusyn church members in the United States, with 320,000 belonging to the largest Greek Catholic affiliations, 270,000 to the largest Eastern Orthodox affiliations, and 100,000 to various Protestant and other denominations.

== Location ==
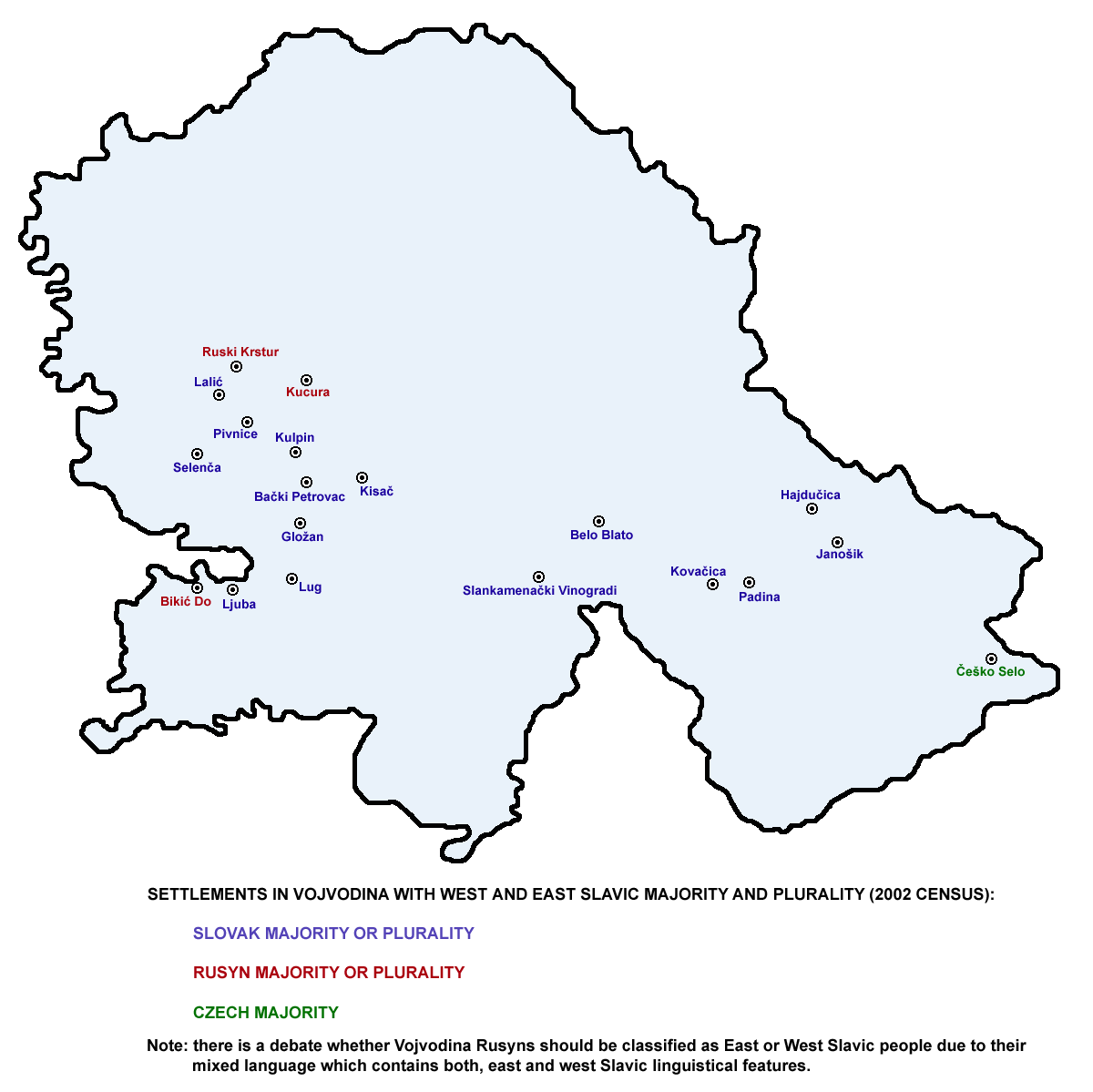
Pannonian Rusyns in Vojvodina, Serbia (2002 census)

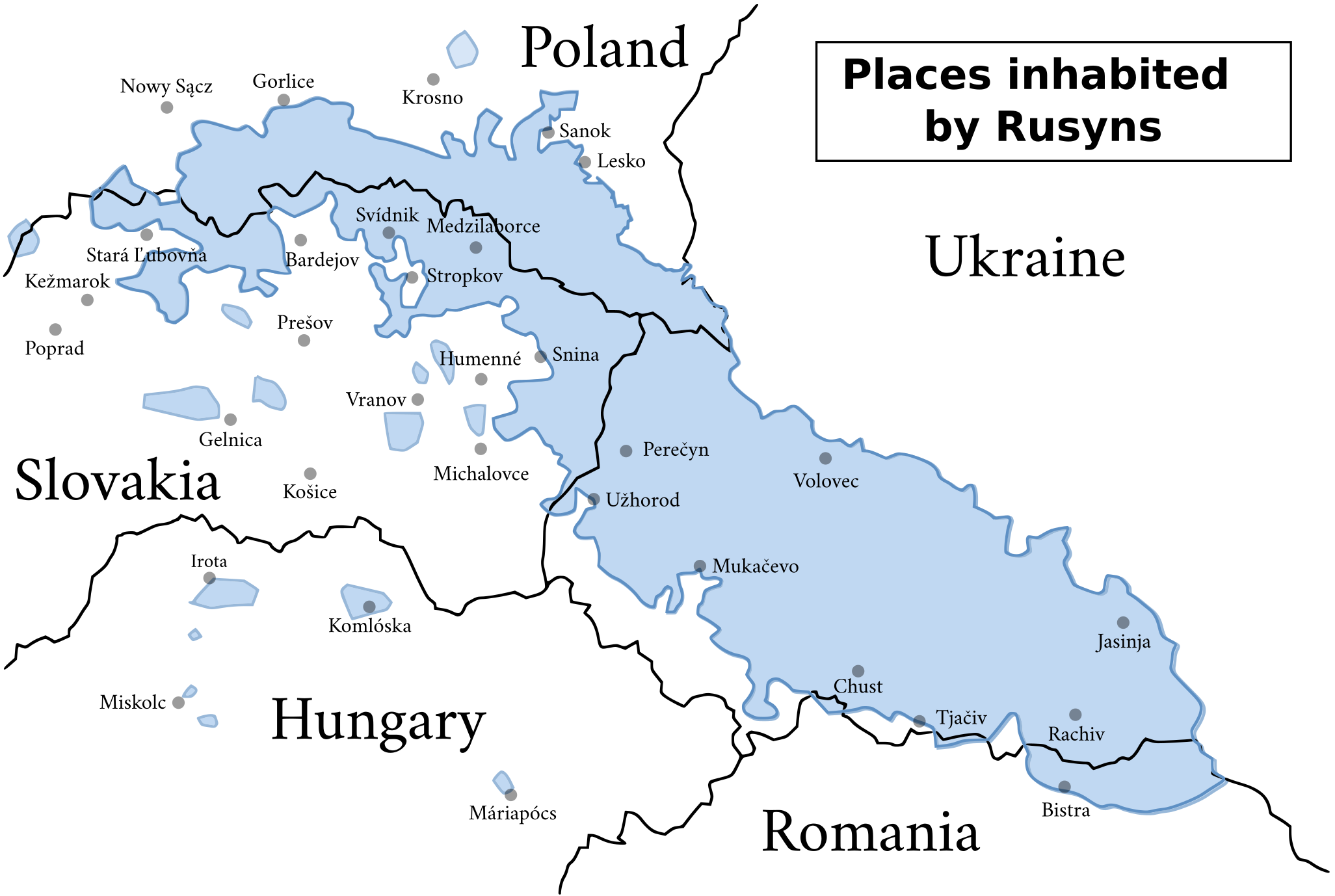
Places inhabited by Rusyns

The traditional homeland of the Rusyn people, Carpathian Rus', lies at the heart of the Carpathian mountains, on the borders of modern-day Ukraine, Poland, and Slovakia. Today, approximately three-quarters of Rusyns reside within Ukraine, specifically the geographic region known as Transcarpathia (historic Subcarpathian Rus'). (Note: Magocsi, 2012)

There also exists a multitude of Rusyn diaspora communities throughout neighboring countries in Europe and North America. The oldest of these diaspora communities is located in the Pannonian Plain. (Note: Magocsi, 2012) Since the mid-18th century, the resettled communities of Pannonia have existed in parts of present-day Serbia (particularly, Vojvodina, known historically as Bachka) and Croatia (in Vukovar-Srijem County). The United States holds the largest population of Rusyns outside of Carpathian Rus', mostly within the former industrial centers of the Northeastern and Midwestern United States. At the end of the 19th and early 20th centuries, approximately 225,000 Rusyns emigrated here. (Note: Magocsi, 2012) Within Europe, Rusyns also migrated and settled in Prnjavor, a town in the northern region of present-day Bosnia and Herzegovina. The community in the Czech Republic is located in northern Moravia and the capital of Prague. Populations of Rusyns also migrated to Canada and Argentina in the 1920s and Canada, Australia, and Germany in the 1970s and 1980s. (Note: Magocsi, 2012)

== Demography ==
Of the estimated 1.2 to 1.6 million people of Rusyn origins, only around 90,000 individuals have been officially identified as such in recent national censuses (see infobox above). This is due, in part, to the refusal of some governments to count Rusyns and/or allow them to self-identify on census forms, especially in Ukraine. The ethnic classification of Rusyns as a separate East Slavic ethnicity distinct from Russians, Ukrainians, or Belarusians is, consequently, politically controversial. The claim that Rusyns are a Ukrainian subgroup is disputed by some non-mainstream scholars, as well as other scholars from the Czech Republic, Slovakia, Canada, and the United States. According to the 2001 Ukrainian Census, thirty percent of Rusyns in Ukraine identified Ukrainian as their native language, while two thirds named the Rusyn language. However, about 10 thousand people, or 0.8%, of Ukraine's Zakarpattia Oblast (Province) identified themselves as Rusyns; by contrast, over 1 million considered themselves Ukrainians. According to the 2022 Romanian census, there were 834 people (0.004% of the population) who identified themselves officially as Rusyns, and 594 who declared that their mother tongue was Rusyn.

The endonym Rusyn has frequently gone unrecognised by various governments, and has in other cases been prohibited. Today, Slovakia, Poland, Hungary, the Czech Republic, Serbia and Croatia officially recognize contemporary Rusyns as an ethnic minority. In 2007, Carpatho-Rusyns were recognized as a separate ethnicity in Ukraine by the Zakarpattia Oblast Council on a regional level. In 2012, the Rusyn language gained official regional status both in the oblast and nationwide after the passage of the law "On the Principles of State Language Policy", but this status was lost in 2018 after the Constitutional Court of Ukraine struck down the legislation.

=== Ethnic subgroups ===
Rusyns may be divided into two significant subgroups: Carpathian Rusyns and Pannonian Rusyns. While both groups are descendants of Rusyn populations from Carpathian Rus', Pannonian Rusyns migrated from the Carpathian to parts of modern-day Croatia and Serbia (Vojvodina) in the 19th century. Additionally, the two groups speak different dialects (or languages, depending on the author): the former group speaking Carpathian Rusyn and the latter speaking Pannonian Rusyn.

Other more specific, regional subgroups (debatably) include Lemkos, Boykos, Hutsuls, and Dolinyans/Dolinians (lit. 'lowlanders' are a mixed Polish and Rusyn group from Polish-Rusyn ethnic borderlands, some identify as Rusyns and some as Poles). However, the Lemko-Boyko-Hutsul subdivision popular with Ukrainian scholars was only first promoted in the 1920s by the Lemko Committee and other contemporary Ukrainian scholars. Furthermore, while Lemkos and Rusyns are recognized as distinct ethnic minorities in Croatia, Hungary, Romania, Poland, Serbia and Slovakia, neither Boykos nor Hutsuls are formally recognized in any country; nor are any Rusyns for that matter recognized as such in Ukraine.

Regarding these common ethnographic divisions, prominent Rusyn scholar, Paul Robert Magocsi, has said the following:

The tripartite Lemko-Boiko-Hutsul schema […] does not, however, respond to reality on the ground. For example, Carpatho-Rusyns on the southern slopes of the mountains have never referred to themselves as either Lemkos or Boikos, while the area inhabited by self-designated Hutsuls is for the most part outside Carpathian Rus'. Only 17 villages […] (a mere 3 percent of the total number of villages in historic Carpathian Rus') are inhabited by persons who may use Hutsul as a self-identifier. On the other hand, the name Hutsul has taken on a broader and vaguer meaning. Especially in today's Ukraine it is used as a kind of term of endearment to describe all the inhabitants of Ukraine's Transcarpathian oblast, who are viewed with nostalgia as pristine mountaineers […]

== Gallery ==
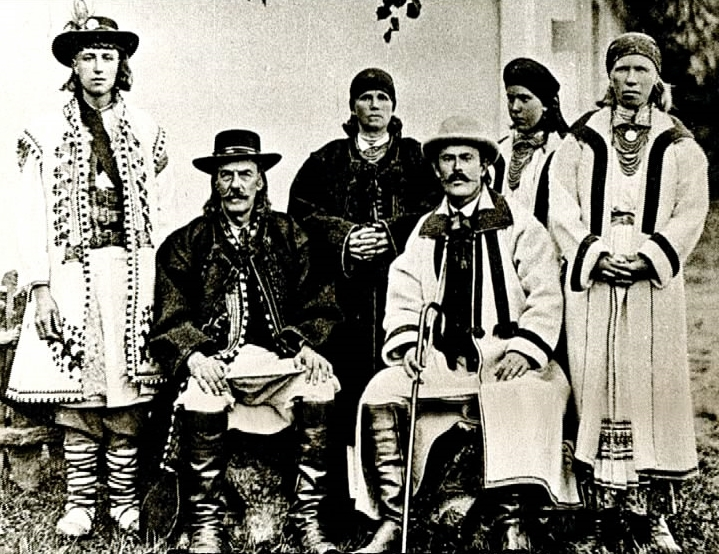
Boyko family, late 19th century

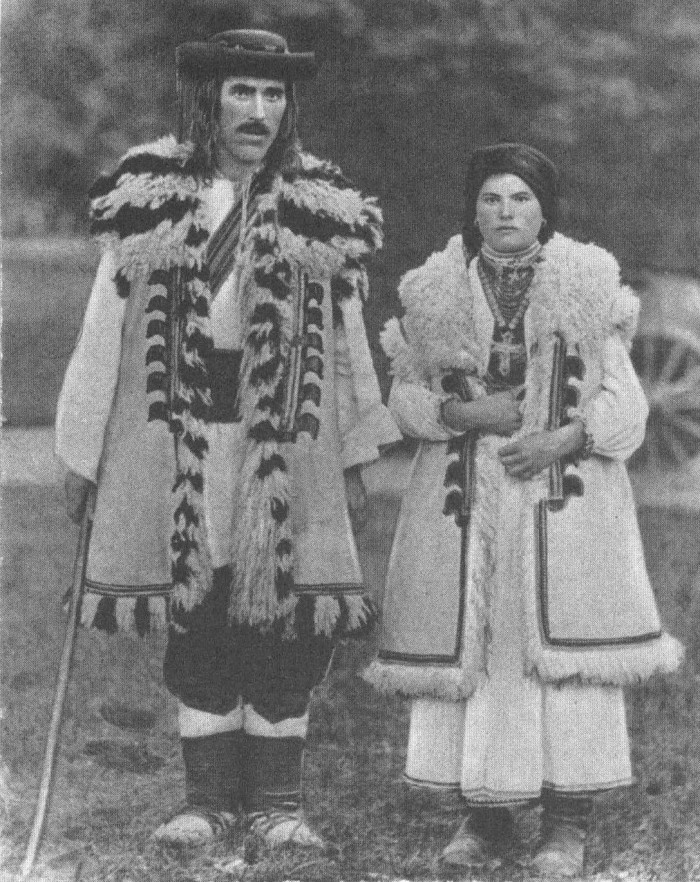
Boyko family, early 20th century

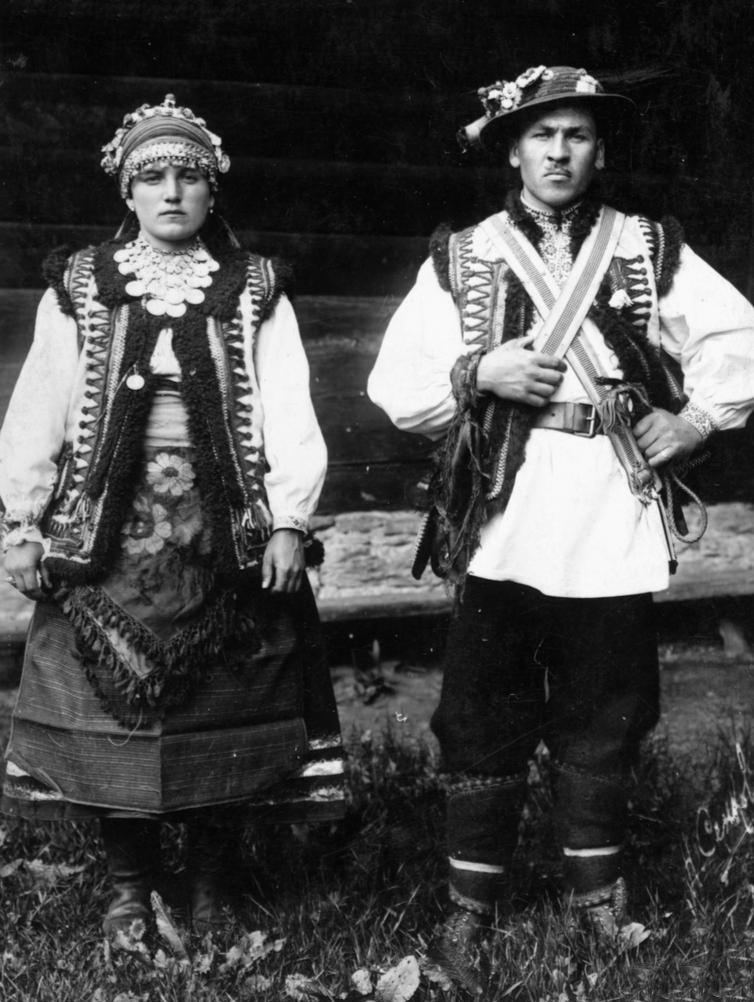
Hutsul family, 1925–1939

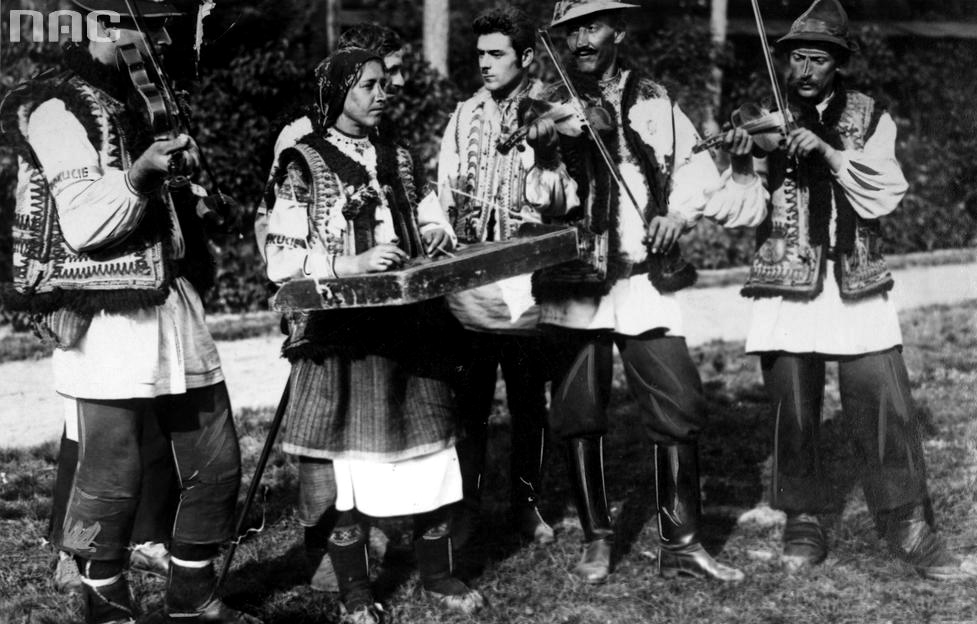
Hutsul music band, 1918–1935

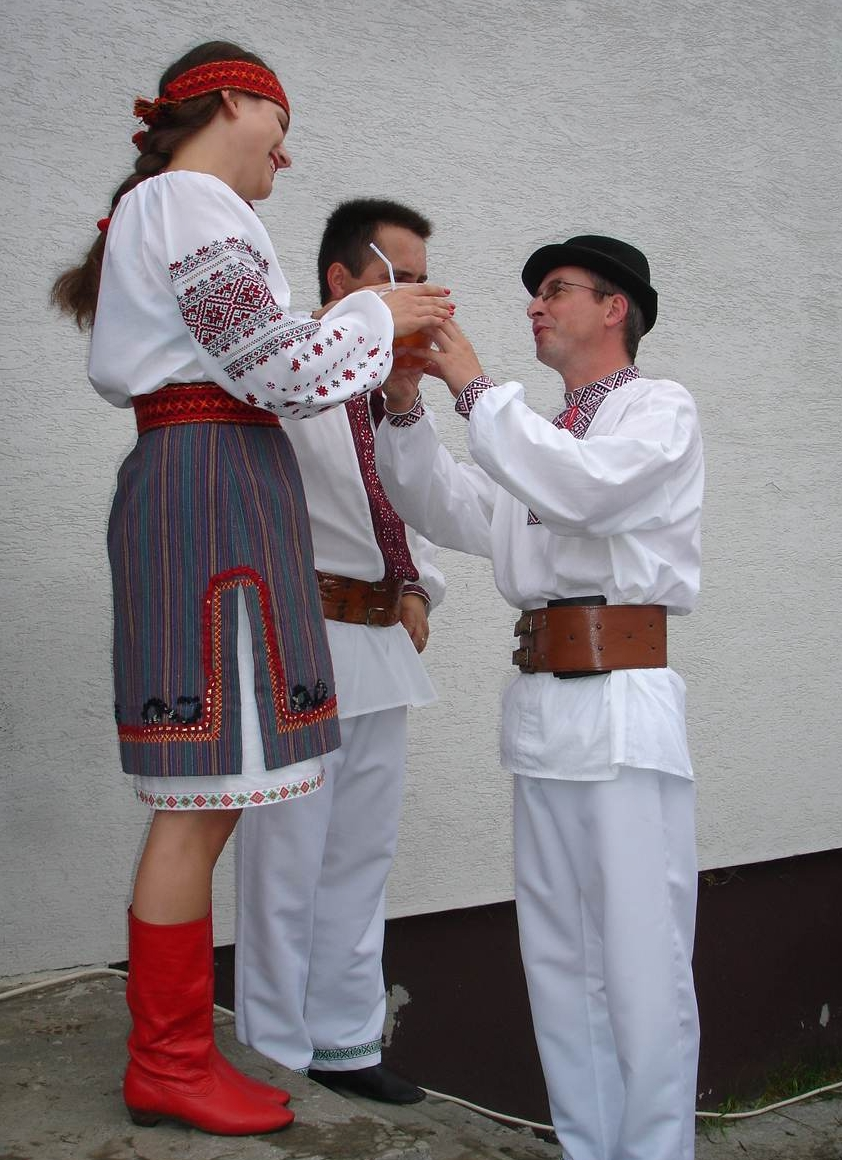
Lemkos from Sanok in stylized highland folk-costumes from Mokre (Poland)

Rusyn wedding

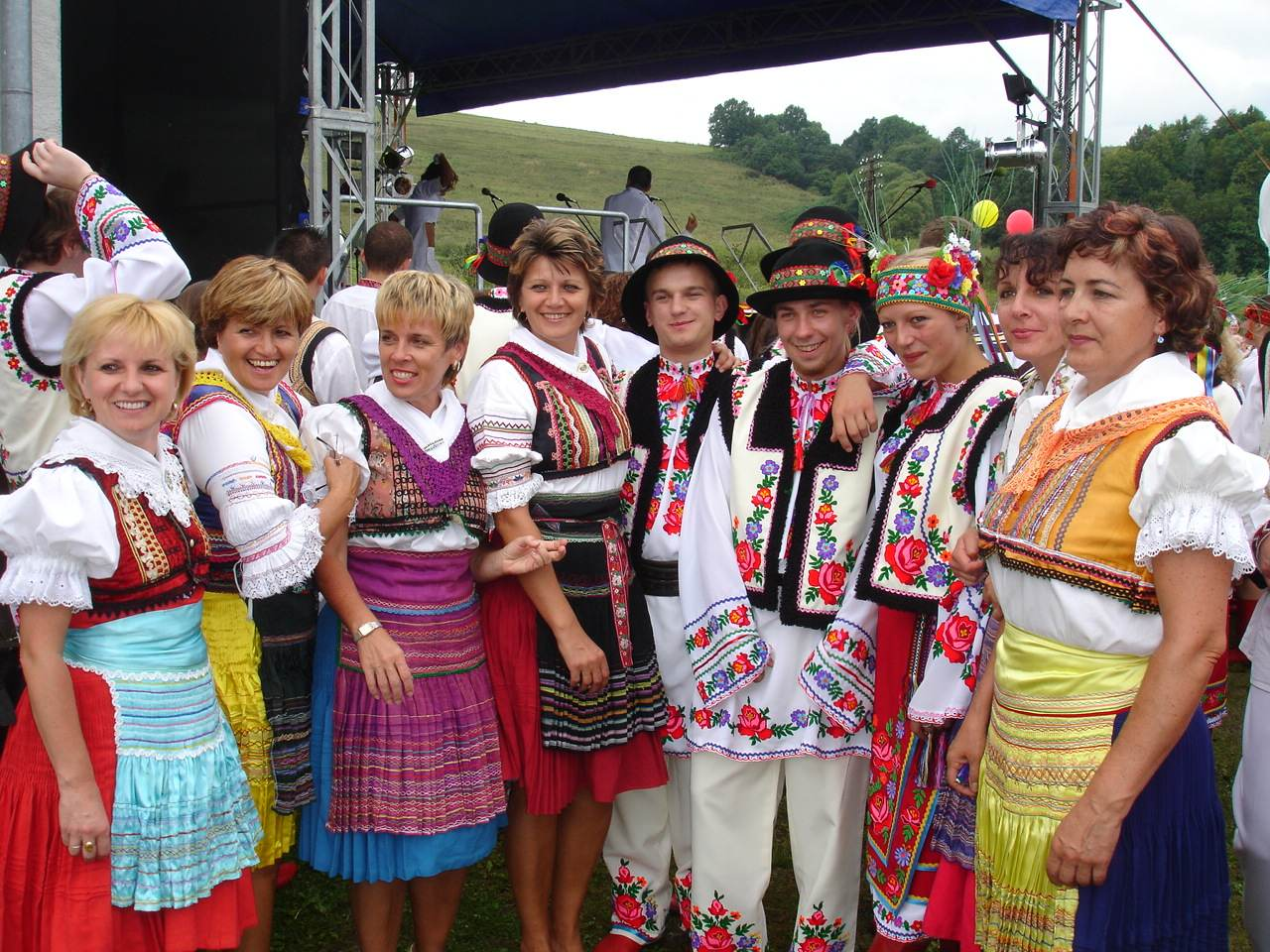
Rusyns from Prešov (4 women on the left side and 1 woman on the far right) in their folk costumes and Ukrainians from Przemyśl in stylized Bukovina highlands costumes

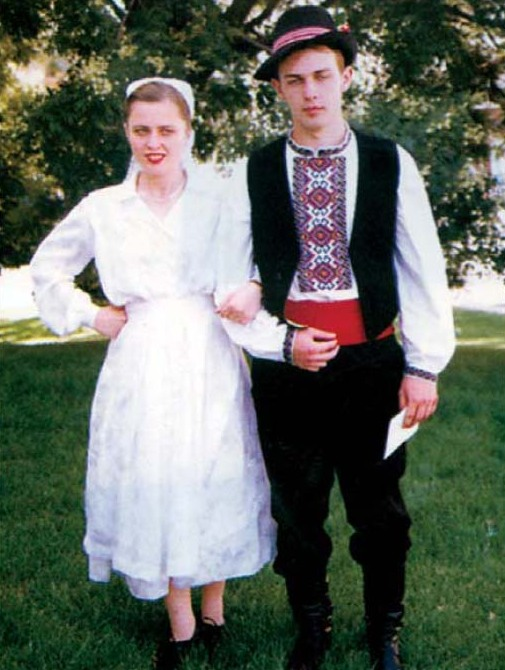
Ruthenian costume from Petrovci, Croatia

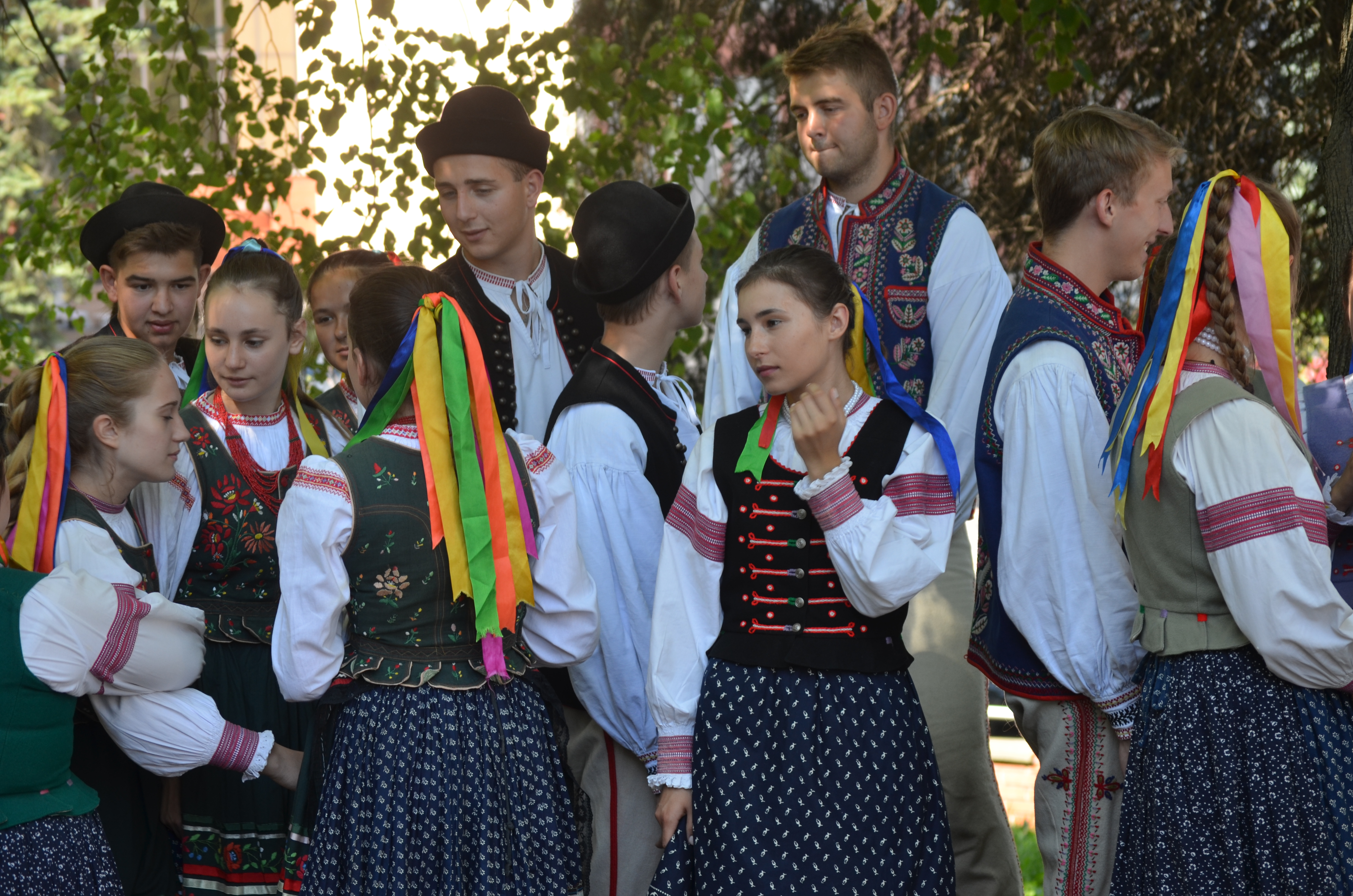
Traditional Lemko folk costume

== Notable people ==
- Category:People of Rusyn descent

== See also ==
- Pogórzanie

== General and cited sources ==
- Bonkáló, Alexander (1990). The Rusyns. New York: Columbia University Press. ISBN 978-0-88033-190-6. Archived from the original on 2019-05-15.
- Csernicskó, István; Fedinec, Csilla (2016). "Four Language Laws of Ukraine". International Journal on Minority and Group Rights. 23: 560–582. Archived from the original on 2022-02-17.
- Himka, John-Paul (1999). Religion and Nationality in Western Ukraine: The Greek Catholic Church and the Ruthenian National Movement in Galicia, 1870–1900. Montreal & Kingston: McGill-Queen's University Press. ISBN 978-0-7735-1812-4. Archived from the original on 2021-12-02.
- Катунин, Дмитрий А. (2015). "Языковые права русинов, украинцев и других национальных меньшинств в законодательстве Республики Сербия". Русин: Международный Исторический Журнал. 39 (1): 229–238. Archived from the original on 2021-08-07.
- Litwin, Henryk (1987). "Catholicization among the Ruthenian Nobility and Assimilation Processes in the Ukraine during the Years 1569–1648" (PDF). Acta Poloniae Historica. 55: 57–83. Archived (PDF) from the original on 2021-07-06.
- Magocsi, Paul R.; Pop, Ivan I., eds. (2005) [2002]. Encyclopedia of Rusyn History and Culture (2. rev. ed.). Toronto: University of Toronto Press.
- Magocsi, Paul R. (2002). The Roots of Ukrainian Nationalism: Galicia as Ukraine's Piedmont. Toronto: University of Toronto Press. ISBN 978-0-8020-4738-0. Archived from the original on 2019-05-15.
- Magocsi, Paul R. (2005) [1984]. Our people: Carpatho-Rusyns and their Descendants in North America (4. rev. ed.). Wauconda: Bolchazy-Carducci Publishers. ISBN 978-0-86516-611-0. Archived from the original on 2019-05-15.
- Magocsi, Paul R. (2011a). "The Fourth Rus': A New Reality in a New Europe" (PDF). Journal of Ukrainian Studies. 35–36 (2010–2011): 167–177. Archived (PDF) from the original on 2021-07-17.
- Magocsi, Paul R. (2015). With Their Backs to the Mountains: A History of Carpathian Rus' and Carpatho-Rusyns. Budapest-New York: Central European University Press. ISBN 9786155053467. Archived from the original on 2020-12-08.
- Pekar, Athanasius B. (1979). The Bishops of the Eparchy of Mukachevo, with Historical Outlines. Pittsburgh: Byzantine Seminary Pres. Archived from the original on 2020-11-19.
- Rusinko, Elaine (2003). Straddling Borders: Literature and Identity in Subcarpathian Rus'. Toronto: University of Toronto Press. ISBN 978-0-8020-3711-4. Archived from the original on 2019-05-15.
- Rychlík, Jan; Rychlíková, Magdaléna (2016). Podkarpatská Rus v dějinách Československa 1918–1946. Praha: Vyšehrad. ISBN 9788074297694. Archived from the original on 2019-05-15.
- Véghseő, Tamás (2015). "Reflections on the Background to the Union of Uzhhorod / Ungvár (1646)" (PDF). Eastern Theological Journal. 1 (1): 147–181. Archived (PDF) from the original on 2021-07-06.
- Magocsi, Paul R. (2012). Carpatho-Rusyns. New York: Carpatho-Rusyn Research Center.
