= Dimitry Sydor =

Rusyn Archpriest

Sydor in 2012

Dimitry Sydor (SEE-door; Ukrainian: Димитрій Димитрович Сидор, romanized: Dymytriy Dymytrovych Sydor; born 29 March 1955) is a Ukrainian Orthodox Church (Moscow Patriarchate) priest and political activist of Rusyn origin, the archpriest of the Cathedral of Christ the Saviour in Uzhhorod.

In 2008, Sydor announced the unrecognized independence of "Subcarpathian Rus" Republic. He was later sentenced for separatism.

== Biography ==
Dimitry Sydor was born on 29 March 1955, in Letsovytsia, Mukachevo Raion. He began his studies with the "Electronic devices" (Ukrainian: "Електронні прибори") major in the Uzhhorod Institute in 1971. After that he worked for a Soviet military company in Mukachevo called Mukachevpribor supplying equipment for nuclear submarines and was sent on business trips to military plants and bases in Severodvinsk, Severomorsk and Gadzhiyevo. In 1982, he graduated Moscow Theological Academy and became a Candidate of Theology.

== Religious career ==
Sydor was an editor of the Christian Family (Ukrainian: "Християнська родина") newspaper.

As of 2026, he is the mitrophroic protoiereus and conducts church service in the Cathedral of Christ the Saviour in Uzhhorod; it is regularly livestreamed to the cathedral's social media pages.

Sydor is the head of a non-governmental organization Transcarpathian Cyril and Methodius Society (Ukrainian: "Закарпатське товариство імені Кирила і Мефодія") and a religious organization Orthodox Religious UOC Community (Exaltation of the Cross) (Ukrainian: "Православна релігійна громада УПЦ (Хресто-Воздвиженська)").

He has co-authored Rusyn-language translations of the Gospel, Apostolos, and Psalms.

== Rusyn language grammar ==
Dimitry Sydor is the main author of the 2002 Subcarpathian Rusyn Grammar (Rusyn: "Граматика Подкарпато-русинського языка для подкарпа́тськых русинốв Закарпа́ття-Подкарпа́тськой Руси́, для русинôв, разсе́леных в стра́нах Євро́пы и емігра́нтôв Америкы" [sic]) published by the International Carpathian Institute, Soym of Subcarpathian Rusyns, Ruthenian Orthodox Academy, Cyril and Methodius Slavic Enlightenment Academy, and Transcarpathian Cyril and Methodius Society. The grammar is written in Rusyn with a heavy Church Slavonic influence; Church Slavonic is also frequently mentioned in the text, and is often compared to Rusyn. According to the authors themselves, the grammar was worked on from 1990 to 2002.

== Political career ==
Dimitry Sydor participated in the 1998 election, where he was a self-nominated nonpartisan candidate in the 73rd electoral county (single mandate); on 27 February 1998 he was withdrawn from the vote. A (United) Social-Democratic party candidate Viktor Medvedchuk won the county.

Sydor had balloted once more in 2002 in the 70th electoral county (single mandate), again as a self-nominated nonpartisan candidate, where he received 4,816 votes or 4.33% of support. Serhiy Ratushniak won the county with 35.47% of support. There is conflicting information about whether Sydor was elected a deputy of Zakarpatska Oblast Council in 2002 or not; some sources claim such as Dmytro Horievoy claim he was.

During the 2006 People's Deputy of Ukraine election Sydor was registered as a self-nominated nonpartisan authorized person in the Nataliya Vitrenko Bloc list in the 66th electoral county, but did not get elected.

== Controversy and court trials ==
=== Letter to Zakarpatska Oblast Council regarding the 1991 referendum ===
On 25 October 2008 II European Subcarpathian Rusyn Congress was held, during which three organizations including Sydor's Soym of Subcarpathian Rusyns signed a letter to the deputies of Zakarpatska Oblast Council requesting "constitutional realization of results of the 1 December 1991 Referendum on Zakarpatska oblast's status as a special autonomous territory as a subject within independent Ukraine". The event caused a mixed reaction, with some Ukrainian and regional Subcarpathian media outlets accusing those involved of separatism, trespass against Ukrainian territorial integrity and working for the Russian government.

Soon after that, on 30 October 2008, Zakarpattia Online Beta published what was alleged as a response from V. A. Nikonov, then head of the Directors Board of the Russkiy Mir Foundation, to Dimitry Sydor, about his request for financial "support of Rusyn and Russian Sunday schools of Zakarpattia", initially not specifying any sources, but later stating the alleged letter had been obtained from the outlet's "source in the authorities". The article was then reprinted by other similar media and used as an argument that Sydor cooperates with Russia.

On 20 November 2008 Zaxid.net published an article quoting Sydor himself: "There indeed was such information on the foundation's website, that they agree to help us maintain the schools. However, it was back in August and we haven't received a single cent since. […] The information that Rusyns receive money from Russia is SSU's [Security Service of Ukraine] game".

=== Trespass against territorial integrity and inviolability of Ukraine court trial ===
On 5 December 2008 the Security Service of Ukraine investigation department initiated a court process against Dimitry Sydor, alleging a violation of Part 1, Article 110 of Criminal Code of Ukraine ("Trespass against territorial integrity and inviolability of Ukraine"). On 19 March 2012 Zakarpatska Oblast Court of Appeals in Uzhhorod held the final hearing in the case and sentenced Sydor to three years of imprisonment with a two years suspended sentence – as was requested by the prosecution.

=== Violation of citizens' equality court trial ===
In March 2023 Security Service of Ukraine staff declared formal suspicion of violation of Part 1, Article 161 of Criminal Code of Ukraine ("Violation of equality of citizens depending on their race, nationality, religious beliefs, disability and other grounds") against Sydor, accusing him of sowing confession-based hate and citing 7 episodes where a forensic linguistic analysis initiated by SSU had found "insults to religious feelings of citizens of other confessions". It was also alleged that Sydor publicly insulted "religious feelings of Ukrainians who expressed intent to celebrate Christmas on 25 December" (as Eastern Orthodox churches in Subcarpathia typically celebrate it on 7 January due to Julian calendar usage). As of February 2026 there isn't a final verdict in the case.

== Personal life ==
Dimitry Sydor is married to Anna Shutko. They have two daughters: Anna and Mariya.
