= World Congress of Rusyns =

Central event of the international Rusyn community

World Congress of Rusyns (Rusyn: Світовый конґрес русинів / Svitovŷj kongres rusyniv) is the central event of the international Rusyn community. Its executive committee is called the World Council of Rusyns and currently has ten members: nine representing various countries in which most Rusyns live, and one ex officio voting member, the current chairperson of the World Forum of Rusyn Youth. The longtime chairman of the Congress was historian Paul Robert Magocsi, who now holds the title of Honorary President.

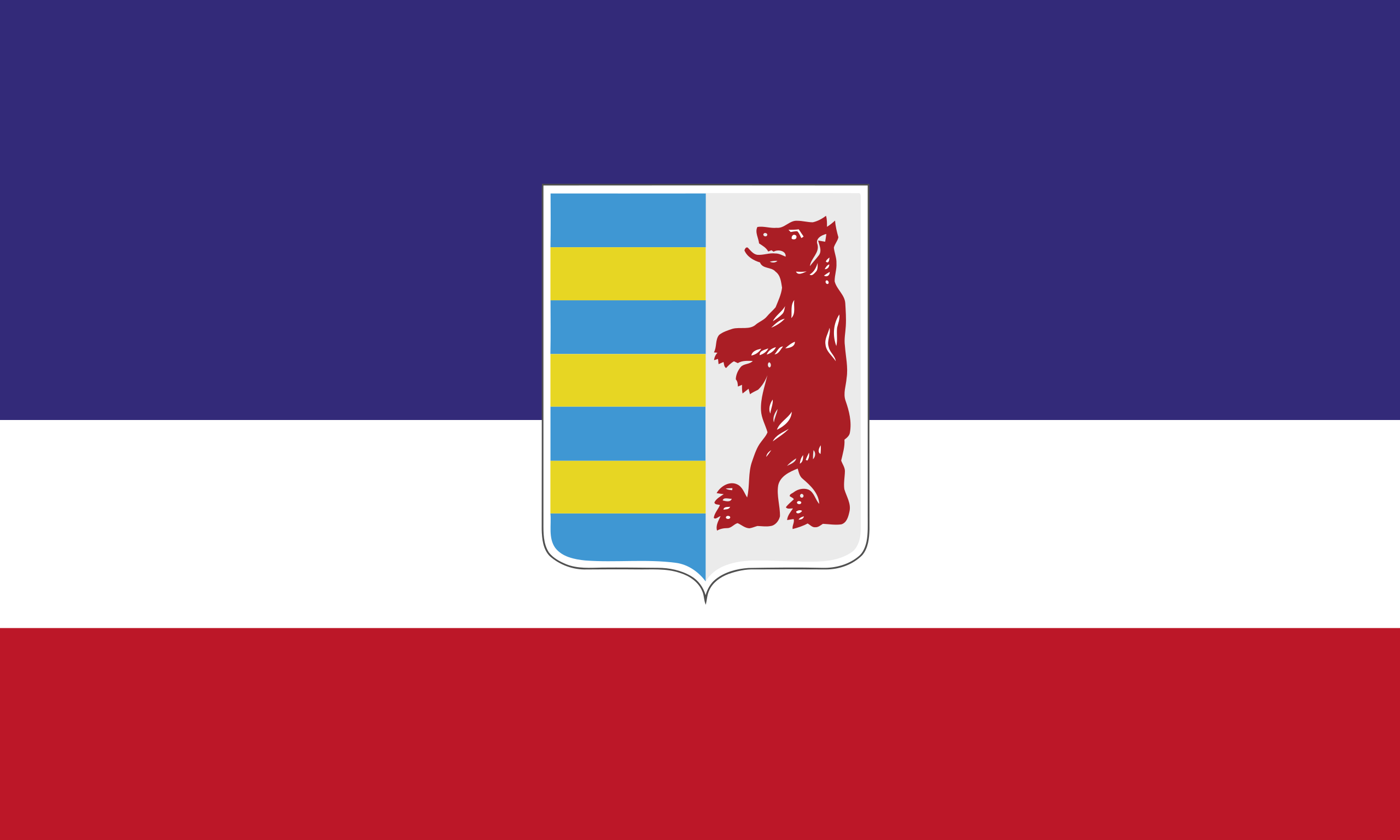
Flag of Rusyns, approved by the World Congress of Rusyns in 2007

The flag of the Ruthenians World, also used as the Ruthenian Ethnic Minority Council Flag

Traditional Rusyn coats of arms, also adopted as a symbol of the World Congress of Rusyns

International activities of WCR are focused on two main issues:

- Further development and improvement of Rusyn minority rights in various countries that had already recognized Rusyns as a distinctive national minority.
- Continuation of efforts and initiatives aimed to achieve such recognition for other Rusyn communities, particularly those in Ukraine and some other countries.

Various congressional committees were also formed, dealing specifically with questions related to minority rights and cultural issues (religion, education, language). WCR bodies were not consulted by a group of linguists (including Aleksandr Dulichenko) who decided (in April 2019) to support a proposal that was addressed to the International Organization for Standardization (ISO), requesting suppression of the ISO 639-3 code for Rusyn language (rue) and its division into two distinctive and separate languages. In January 2020, the ISO authorities rejected the request.

In July 2019, various questions related to Rusyn language were discussed at the 15th plenary meeting of WCR that was held in Kamienka (Slovakia), focusing mainly on its former (2012) and current (after 2014) status in Ukraine. In the final conclusions, the aforementioned process (at ISO) was not addressed.

In November 2020, Đura Papuga (Rusyn: Дюра Папуґа), former WCR president from 2009 until 2015, decided to support the previously mentioned group of linguists, who formulated a new proposal, also addressed to the ISO, requesting recognition for one of Rusyn linguistic varieties (Pannonian Rusyn) as a new and separate language, under the proposed name: Ruthenian language. The request is still under deliberation.

The latest (18th) biannual meeting of WCR was held between the 13 and 15 June 2025 in Bucharest, Romania.

== Meetings ==
- 1st 1991, Medzilaborce, Slovakia
- 2nd 1993, Legnica, Poland
- 3rd 1995, Ruski Krstur, Serbia
- 4th 1997, Budapest, Hungary
- 5th 1999, Uzhhorod, Ukraine
- 6th 2001, Prague, Czech Republic
- 7th 2003, Prešov, Slovakia
- 8th 2005, Krynica-Zdrój, Poland
- 9th 2007, Sighetu Marmației, Romania
- 10th 2009, Ruski Krstur, Serbia and Petrovci, Croatia
- 11th 2011, Pilisszentkereszt, Hungary
- 12th 2013, Uzhhorod, Ukraine
- 13th 2015, Deva, Romania
- 14th 2017, Osijek, Croatia
- 15th 2019, Kamienka, Slovakia
- 16th 2021, Krynica-Zdrój, Poland
- 17th 2023, Novi Sad, Serbia
- 18th 2025, Bucharest, Romania

== Sources ==
- Варґа, Михайло, ed. (1997). Зборнїк роботох зоз Трецого шветового конґреса Русинох (Руснацох, Лемкох). Руски Керестур: Руска матка.
- Дуць-Файфер, Олена (2019). "Писма - документы Світового Конґресу Русинів і Світовой Рады Русинів (1991-2019)". Річник Руской Бурсы. 15: 17–89.
- Magocsi, Paul R. (1997). "Mapping Stateless Peoples: The East Slavs of the Carpathians". Canadian Slavonic Papers. 39 (3): 301–331. doi:10.1080/00085006.1997.11092158. JSTOR 40869932.
- Magocsi, Paul R.; Pop, Ivan I., eds. (2005) [2002]. Encyclopedia of Rusyn History and Culture (2. rev. ed.). Toronto: University of Toronto Press.
- Magocsi, Paul R. (2015). With Their Backs to the Mountains: A History of Carpathian Rus' and Carpatho-Rusyns. Budapest-New York: Central European University Press. ISBN 9786155053467.
