= Uzhhorod Orthodox Cathedral =

Orthodox church in Transcarpathia, Ukraine

- Cathedral of Christ the Saviour
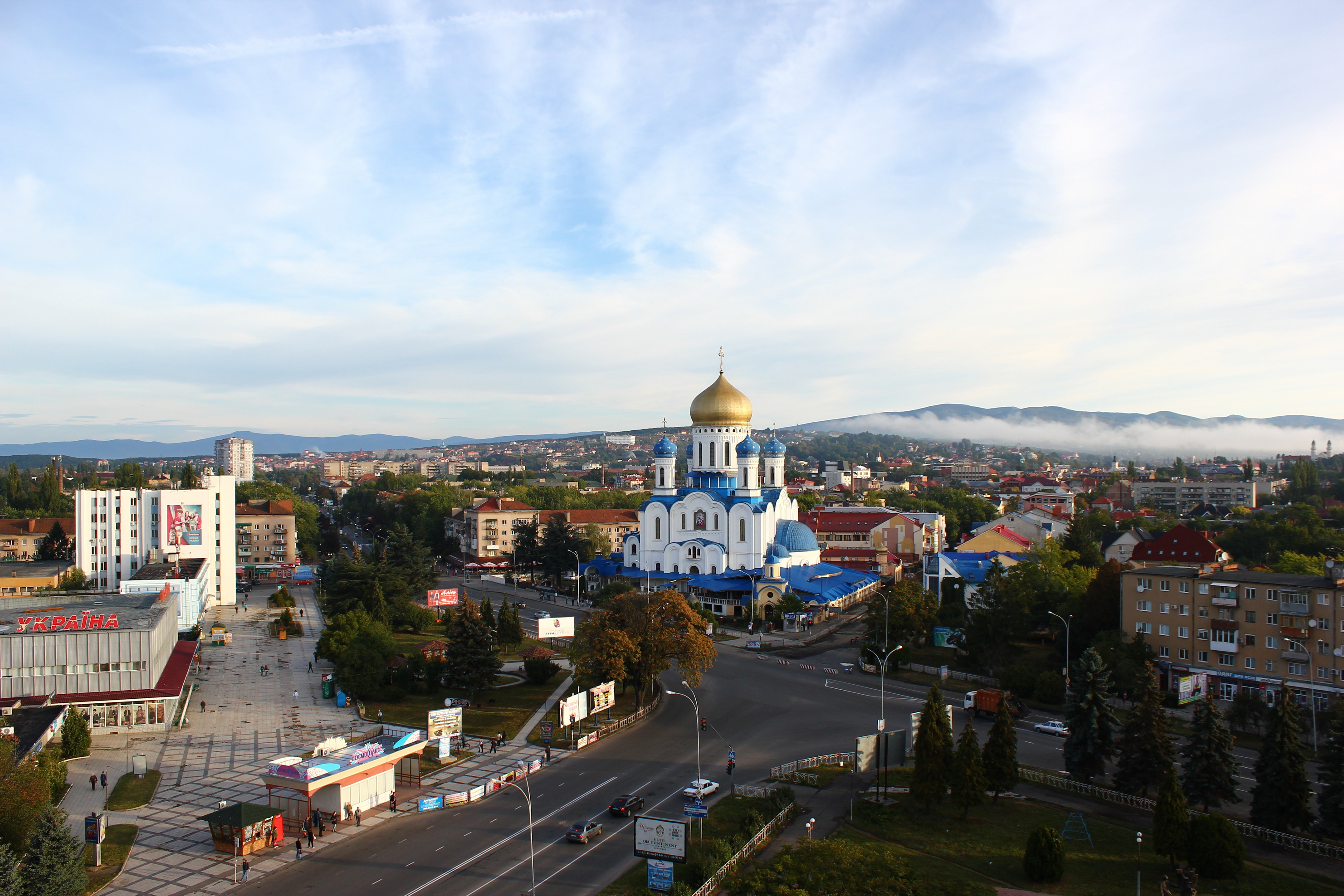
- The cathedral located adjacent to the Square of Cyril and Methodius, 2012

- Location of the cathedral in Ukraine
- Uzhhorod Orthodox Cathedral
- 48°36′50″N 22°17′34″E
- Location: Uzhhorod, Transcarpathia
- Country: Ukraine
- Denomination: Ukrainian Orthodox Church (Moscow Patriarchate)

History
- Status: Cathedral

Architecture
- Functional status: Active
- Completed: c. 1990s

Specifications
- Capacity: 5,000 worshippers
- Height: 60 m (200 ft)

Administration
- Diocese: Mukachevo and Uzhhorod

Clergy
- Bishop: Dmytro Sydor

The Uzhhorod Orthodox Cathedral, official the Cathedral of Christ the Saviour, is the principal Ukrainian Orthodox cathedral in Transcarpathia. It dominates the Cyril and Methodius Square in the city of Uzhhorod.

The 60-metre-tall (200 ft) five-domed church was built in the 1990s after the cathedral of the Holy Cross was restituted to the Greek Catholic Eparchy of Mukachevo. The modern building can hold up to 5,000 worshippers. Its ground floor contains a chapel dedicated to the Exaltation of the Holy Cross. The arch-priest is Dmytro Sydor.

The cathedral belongs to Eparchy of Mukachevo and Uzhhorod of the Ukrainian Orthodox Church. In 2008 the building was raided by the national security agency on suspicion of separatist activities.

== See also ==
- Eparchy of Mukačevo and Prešov
- List of largest Eastern Orthodox church buildings
