= Paul Robert Magocsi =

American historian (born 1945)

- Павел Роберт Маґочій
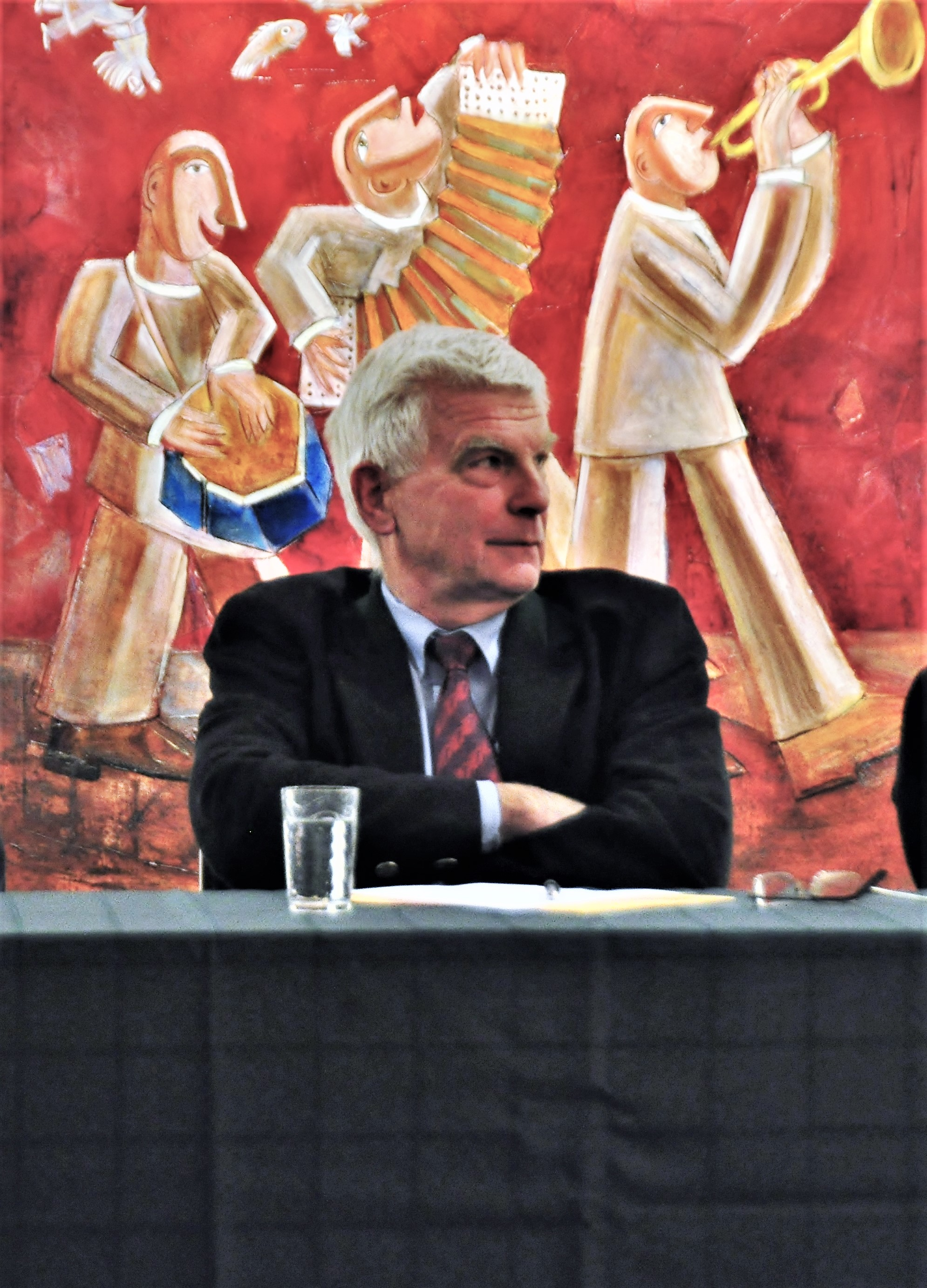
- Paul Robert Magocsi in 2013
- Born: January 26, 1945 (age 81); Englewood, New Jersey, U.S.
- Known for: History of Ukraine, History of Carpatho-Rusyns
- Scientific career
- Fields: History

Paul Robert Magocsi (Rusyn: Павел Роберт Маґочій, romanized: Pavel Robert Magochy; born January 26, 1945) is an American professor of history, political science, and Chair of Ukrainian Studies at the University of Toronto. He has been with the university since 1980 and became a Fellow of the Royal Society of Canada in 1996. He currently acts as Honorary Chairman of the World Congress of Rusyns, and has authored many books on Rusyn history.

== Life ==
Born in Englewood, New Jersey, Magocsi (his surname Magocsi is pronounced something like "magótchy", varying in different languages) is of Hungarian and Ruthenian (Rusyn) descent. He completed his undergraduate studies at Rutgers University B.A. in 1966; M.A. 1967, Princeton University in M.A. 1969, Ph.D. 1972. He then went to Harvard University, where he was a member of the Society of Fellows between 1973 and 1976. In 2013, he was awarded doctor honoris causa by the University of Prešov in Slovakia.

Magocsi has taught at Harvard University and the Hebrew University in Jerusalem. In 1996, he was appointed permanent fellow of the Royal Society of Canada—Canadian Academies of Arts, Humanities and Sciences.

Besides his primary focus on East-Central European history, Magocsi is a scholar of nationality and ethnicity more generally, and edited the collection Aboriginal Peoples of Canada: A Short Introduction (2002).

In 2025 his Ukraine: A History Course, consisting of 45 lectures recorded by the Chair of Ukrainian Studies, along with a semester course The People From Nowhere: A History of Carpathian Rus' (22 lectures) were published on YouTube.

In 2025 a Festschrift consisting of 183 testimonials, In So Many Words: Celebrating Paul Robert Magocsi, Edited by Nicholas Kupensky, was published.

In September 2025 a curated Paul Robert Magocsi Map Collection featuring 486 maps of Ukraine, Crimea, and Central Europe drawn from 19 books was shared online for education/reference purposes.

== Selected books and publications ==
Among his over 675 publications, some of the most notable are:

=== Books ===
- Magocsi, Paul R. (1978). The Shaping of a National Identity: Subcarpathian Rus', 1848-1948. Cambridge: Harvard University Press. ISBN 9780674805798.
- Magocsi, Paul R. (1983). Galicia: A Historical Survey and Bibliographic Guide. Toronto: University of Toronto Press. ISBN 9780802024824.
- Magocsi, Paul R. (1989), Morality and Reality: the Life and Times of Andrei Sheptytskyi, Edmonton Alberta: Canadian Institute of Ukrainian Studies, University of Alberta, ISBN 0-920862-68-3.
- Magocsi, Paul R. (2005) [1984]. Our people: Carpatho-Rusyns and their Descendants in North America (4. rev. ed.). Wauconda: Bolchazy-Carducci Publishers. ISBN 9780865166110.
- Magocsi, Paul R. (1988). Carpatho-Rusyn Studies: An Annotated Bibliography, 1975-1984. Vol. 1. New York: Garland. ISBN 9780824012144.
  - Magocsi, Paul R. (1998). Carpatho-Rusyn Studies: An Annotated Bibliography, 1985-1994. Vol. 2. New York: Columbia University Press. ISBN 9780880334204.
  - Magocsi, Paul R. (2006). Carpatho-Rusyn Studies: An Annotated Bibliography, 1995-1999. Vol. 3. New York: Columbia University Press. ISBN 9780880335317.
  - Magocsi, Paul R. (2011). Carpatho-Rusyn Studies: An Annotated Bibliography, 2000-2004. Vol. 4. New York: Columbia University Press. ISBN 9780880336840.
  - Magocsi, Paul R. (2013). Carpatho-Rusyn Studies: An Annotated Bibliography, 2005-2009. Vol. 5. New York: Columbia University Press. ISBN 9780824058364.
- Magocsi, Paul R. (2000) [1988]. The Carpatho-Rusyn Americans (2. ed.). New York-Philadelphia: Chelsea House Publishers. ISBN 9780791062845.
- Magocsi, Paul R. (1990). "Magyars and Carpatho-Rusyns: On the Seventieth Anniversary of the Founding of Czechoslovakia". Harvard Ukrainian Studies. 14 (3–4): 427–460.
- Magocsi, Paul R. (1993). The Rusyns of Slovakia: An Historical Survey. New York: Columbia University Press. ISBN 9780880332781.Magocsi, Paul R. (1993). Historical Atlas of East Central Europe (1. ed.). Seattle: University of Washington Press. ISBN 9780802006073.
- Magocsi, Paul R. (2018) [1993]. Historical Atlas of Central Europe (3. rev. ed.). Toronto: University of Toronto Press. ISBN 9781487523312.
- Magocsi, Paul R., ed. (1996). A New Slavic Language Is Born: The Rusyn Literary Language of Slovakia. New York: Columbia University Press.
- Magocsi, Paul R. (2010) [1996]. A History of Ukraine: The Land and Its Peoples (2. rev. ed.). Toronto: University of Toronto Press. ISBN 9781442610217.
- Petrov, Aleksei L. (1998) [1930]. Magocsi, Paul R. (ed.). Medieval Carpathian Rus': The Oldest Documentation About the Carpatho-Rusyn Church and Eparchy. New York: Columbia University Press. ISBN 9780880333887.
- Magocsi, Paul R. (1999). Of the Making of Nationalities There is no End. Vol. 1. New York: Columbia University Press. ISBN 0-88033-438-X.
- Magocsi, Paul R. (1999). Of the Making of Nationalities There is no End. Vol. 2. New York: Columbia University Press.
- Magocsi, Paul R., ed. (1999). Encyclopedia of Canada's Peoples. Toronto: University of Toronto Press. ISBN 9780802029386.
- Magocsi, Paul R. (2002). The Roots of Ukrainian Nationalism: Galicia as Ukraine's Piedmont. Toronto: University of Toronto Press. ISBN 9780802047380.
- Magocsi, Paul Robert (2002). Aboriginal Peoples of Canada. Toronto: University of Toronto Press. ISBN 9780802084699.
- Magocsi, Paul R.; Pop, Ivan I., eds. (2005) [2002]. Encyclopedia of Rusyn History and Culture (2. rev. ed.). Toronto: University of Toronto Press.
- Magocsi, Paul Robert (2014). This Blessed Land: Crimea and the Crimean Tatars. Toronto: University of Toronto Press. ISBN 978-0772751102.
- Magocsi, Paul R. (2015). With Their Backs to the Mountains: A History of Carpathian Rus' and Carpatho-Rusyns. Budapest-New York: Central European University Press. ISBN 9786155053467. JSTOR 10.7829/j.ctt19z395j.
- Magocsi, Paul Robert (2022). Ukraina Redux. On Statehood and National Identity (PDF). Kashtan Press. ISBN 9781896354231.
- Magocsi, Paul Robert; Hrynevych, Vladyslav (2023). Babyn Yar: History and Memory. Toronto: University of Toronto Press. ISBN 978-0772751164.
- Magocsi, Paul Robert (2024). From Nowhere to Somewhere. The Carpatho-Rusyn Movement. A Personal History. Stuttgart: ibidem. ISBN 978-3-83821973-8.
- Magocsi, Paul Robert; Petrovsky-Shtern, Yohanan (2024). Jews and Ukrainians. Stuttgart: ibidem. ISBN 978-3-83821963-9.

=== Articles and book chapters ===
- Magocsi, Paul R. (1973). "An Historiographical Guide to Subcarpathian Rus'" (PDF). Austrian History Yearbook. 9: 201–265. doi:10.1017/S006723780001910X. S2CID 144778333. Archived from the original (PDF) on 2019-12-05.
- Magocsi, Paul R. (1975). "The Ruthenian Decision to Unite with Czechoslovakia" (PDF). Slavic Review. 34 (2): 360–381. doi:10.2307/2495193. JSTOR 2495193. S2CID 155615547. Archived from the original (PDF) on 2019-04-28.
- Magocsi, Paul Robert (1987). "Ucrainica Collections and Bibliography in North America: Their Current Status". Journal of Ukrainian Studies. 12 (2): 77–91.
- Magocsi, Paul Robert (1996). "Ukrainians and the Habsburgs". Journal of Ukrainian Studies. 21 (1–2): 55–66.
- Magocsi, Paul Robert (2010–2011). "The Fourth Rus': A New Reality in a New Europe" (PDF). Journal of Ukrainian Studies. 35–36: 167–177.
- Magocsi, Paul R. (2013). "Carpathian Rus': Interethnic Coexistence without Violence". Shatterzone of Empires: Coexistence and Violence in the German, Habsburg, Russian, and Ottoman Borderlands. Bloomington-Indianapolis: Indiana University Press. pp. 449–462. ISBN 978-0253006318.
- Magocsi, Paul Robert (2015). "The heritage of autonomy in Carpathian Rus' and Ukraine's Transcarpathian region" (PDF). Nationalities Papers. 4 (43): 577–594. doi:10.1080/00905992.2015.1009433.

=== Video courses ===
- Ukraine: A History taught at the University of Toronto, 2023–2024

== Biographies ==
- Kuzio, Taras (2011). "A multi-vectored scholar for a multi-vectored era: Paul Robert Magocsi". Nationalities Papers. 39 (1): 95–104. doi:10.1080/00905992.2010.533259.

== See also ==
- Rusyns
- Ruthenia
