= List of cathedrals in Slovakia =

This is the list of cathedrals and co-cathedrals in Slovakia sorted by denomination.

== Catholic ==
=== Latin Rite ===
The following are Latin Rite cathedrals and co-cathedrals of the Catholic Church in Slovakia:

Cathedral	Archdiocese or Diocese	Location	Dedication	Notes	Image
Banská Bystrica Cathedral; Katedrála svätého Františka Xaverského	Banská Bystrica	Banská Bystrica	St. Francis Xavier	Cathedral	
Bratislava Cathedral; Katedrála svätého Martina	Bratislava	Bratislava	Saint Martin	Cathedral since March 2008 (previously co-cathedral)	
Elizabeth Cathedral; Dóm svätej Alžbety	Košice	Košice	Saint Elizabeth	Biggest church in Slovakia; Easternmost Gothic cathedral in Europe	
Nitra Cathedral; Bazilika svätého Emeráma	Nitra	Nitra	Saint Emmeram	Cathedral, minor basilica	
Rožňava Cathedral; Katedrála Nanebovzatia Panny Márie	Rožňava	Rožňava	Assumption of Mary	Cathedral	
Spišská Kapitula Cathedral; Katedrála svätého Martina	Spiš	Spišská Kapitula	Saint Martin	Cathedral, World Heritage Site	
Trnava Cathedral; Katedrála svätého Jána Krstiteľa	Trnava	Trnava	St. John the Baptist	Cathedral	
Žilina Cathedral; Katedrála Najsvätejšej Trojice	Žilina	Žilina	Holy Trinity	Cathedral since 2008	
Military Ordinariate Cathedral; Katedrála svätého Šebastiána v Bratislave - Krasňanoch	Military Ordinariate	Bratislava	Saint Sebastian	Cathedral since 2009	
Co-Cathedral of Our Lady of Sorrows; Konkatedrála Sedembolestnej Panny Márie	Spiš	Poprad	Our Lady of Sorrows		
Co-Cathedral of St. Nicholas; Konkatedrála svätého Mikuláša	Košice	Prešov	Saint Nicholas		

=== Eastern Rites ===
The following cathedrals of the Slovak Greek Catholic Church are located in Slovakia:

Cathedral	Eparchy or Archeparchy	City	Dedication	Image
Temple of the Exaltation of the Holy Cross; Chrám Povýšenia vznešeného a životodarného kríža	Eparchy of Bratislava	Bratislava	Exaltation of the Holy Cross	
Temple of Birth of the Holy Mother of God; Chrám Narodenia Presvätej Bohorodičky	Eparchy of Košice	Košice	Birth of the Holy Mother of God	
St. John the Baptist Cathedral; Chrám svätého Jána Krstiteľa	Archeparchy of Prešov	Prešov	St. John the Baptist	

== Eastern Orthodox ==
The following cathedrals of the Czech and Slovak Orthodox Church cathedrals are located in Slovakia:

Cathedral	Archdiocese or Diocese	Location	Dedication	Image
Cathedral of Sts. Apostles Cyril and Methodius	Diocese of Michalovce and Košice	Michalovce	Sts. Apostles Cyril and Methodius	
Cathedral of St. Prince Alexander Nevsky	Archdiocese of Prešov and Slovakia	Prešov	Alexander Nevsky	

== See also ==
- List of cathedrals
