= Ján Babjak =

Slovak Greek Catholic prelate

The Most Reverend Ján Babjak, S.J.
- Archbishop of Prešov
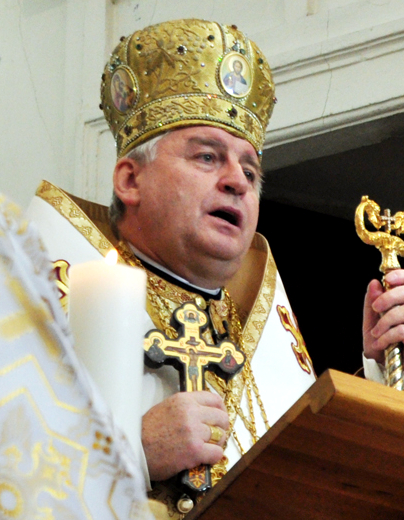
- Ján Babjak in 2012
- Church: Slovak Greek Catholic Church
- Diocese: Archeparchy of Prešov
- See: Prešov
- In office: 2003 - 2022
- Predecessor: Ján Hirka
- Successor: Peter Rusnák (Apostolic Administrator)

Orders
- Ordination: 11 June 1978
- Consecration: 6 January 2003 by Pope John Paul II

Personal details
- Born: 28 October 1953 (age 72) Hažín nad Cirochou, Czechoslovakia (present day Slovakia)
- Motto: You are the temple of the living God
- Coat of arms

Ján Babjak, S.J. (born 28 October 1953, in Hažín nad Cirochou) is Slovak Greek Catholic prelate and a first Archieparch of Prešov, previously serving as the 10th Bishop, and the highest representative of the Greek Catholic sui iuris Church in Slovakia.

== Early life and studies ==
After studying at the Bratislava seminary was ordained a priest on 11 June 1978 in Prešov. His pastoral service performed as a chaplain in Prešov from 1978 to 1983. In August 1983 he began work as a parish administrator in the Ľubica in Kežmarok District.

On 18 June 1987, he secretly joined the Society of Jesus. From 1989 to 1990 he was the Prefect of the Seminary of St. Cyril and Methodius at Comenius University in Bratislava. In 1990 he became pastor of the Greek Catholic parish in Bratislava, where he served one year. From 1991 to 1993 he studied at the Pontifical Oriental Institute in Rome, where he received a licentiate of spirituality.

== Society of Jesus ==
After his return to newly independent Slovakia in 1993 and 1994, he was responsible for the Jesuit retreat house of St. Ignatius in Prešov. In 1994 he returned to Rome, where he worked in the Slovak Radio and the Vatican department in addition, he studied spirituality from which in 1996 at the Pontifical Oriental Institute, defended his doctoral thesis on "P. Michal Lacko - teacher formatter and Greek Catholics."

From 1996 until now served as Director of Works at the Jesuit P. Michael Lack's Center of Spirituality East-West. He also lectured Eastern spirituality at the Faculty of Theology at Comenius University in Bratislava. He replaced

== Named bishop ==
On 11 December 2002, Pope John Paul II named him the 10th Eparchal Bishop of Prešov, being consecrated in St. Peter's Basilica in Vatican City on 6 January 2003 by the Polish Pontiff. In Eparchal office, he replaced 79-year old Eparchal Bishop Ján Hirka, who served as the Apostolic Administrator and the Bishop of the Eparchy since 1968.

On 30 January 2008, Babjak was appointed by Pope Benedict XVI as the first Metropolitan of Prešov and also promoted to the rank of Archeparch. The enthronement of the first Archeparch and Metropolite Ján Babjak took place on Sunday of 17 February 2008 in Prešov Cathedral of St. John the Baptist in Prešov and the celebration elevation of Greek Catholic Church in Slovakia to the level of sui iuris church occurred in the city hall.

On 25 April 2022, Pope Francis accepted Ján Babjak's resignation prior to reaching the canonical age and named Peter Rusnák Greek Catholic Eparchal Bishop of Bratislava the apostolic administrator to the vacated Archeparchy of Prešov. According to Eparchal sources, Babjak requested the release from his pastoral duties in February 2022. In his statement, Archbishop presented his resignation in favour of "peace and wellbeing of the Church"

== Works ==
- Babjak, John P. Michal Lacko, SJ, and informant formatter Catholics. Trnava: Good Book Publishing, 1997. Dialogues.
- Babjak, John: remain faithful: I. volume. Prešov: Petra, 2009. ISBN 978-80-8099-034-3
- Babjak, John: remain faithful: I. volume. Prešov: Petra, 2009. ISBN 978-80-8099-034-3
