= Ján Hirka =

Slovak Greek Catholic bishop (1923–2014)

- Bishop of Prešov
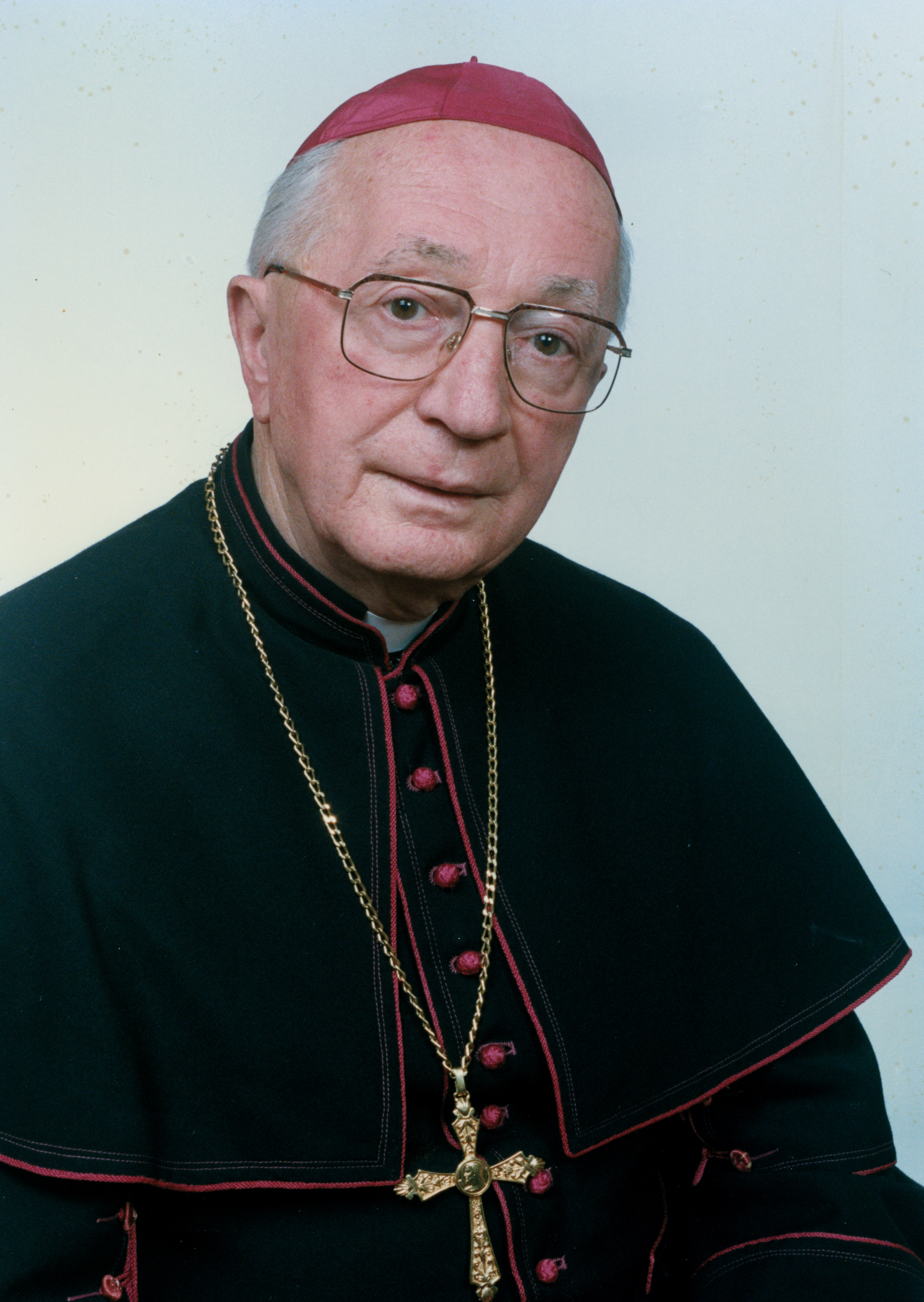
- Church: Slovak Greek Catholic Church
- See: Eparchy of Prešov
- In office: 1989 - 2002
- Predecessor: Bl. Pavel Peter Gojdič, O.S.B.M
- Successor: Ján Babjak, S.J
- Previous post(s): Prelate

Orders
- Ordination: 31 July 1949 by Bl. Vasil Hopko
- Consecration: 17 February 1990 by Cardinal Jozef Tomko

Personal details
- Born: 16 November 1923; Abranovce, Czechoslovakia
- Died: 10 April 2014 (aged 90); Prešov, Slovakia

The Most Reverend Ján Hirka (16 November 1923 – 10 April 2014) was a bishop of the Slovak Greek Catholic Church.

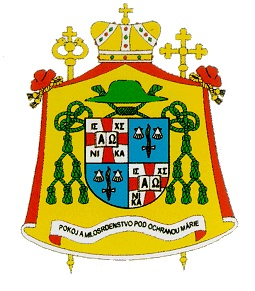
Coat of arms of Bishop Ján Hirka

== Life ==
Hirka was born in Abranovce, Czechoslovakia and was ordained a priest on 31 July 1949. Hirka was appointed Apostolic Administrator of the Archeparchy of Prešov when it was revived on 2 April 1969, after years of suppression under the Communist regime. This was in place of the existing Auxiliary Bishop, Basil Hopko, who had survived years of imprisonment and torture at the hands of the Communists, because of complaints by nationalist members of the Church, who believed that a native Slovak should be the one to head the Church there. He was appointed eparch on 21 December 1989 and ordained as a bishop on 17 February 1990. Hirka retired on 11 December 2002.
