= Jonáš Maxim =

Slovak Greek Catholic bishop (born 1974)

Jonáš Maxim MSU
- Metropolitan Archbishop of Prešov
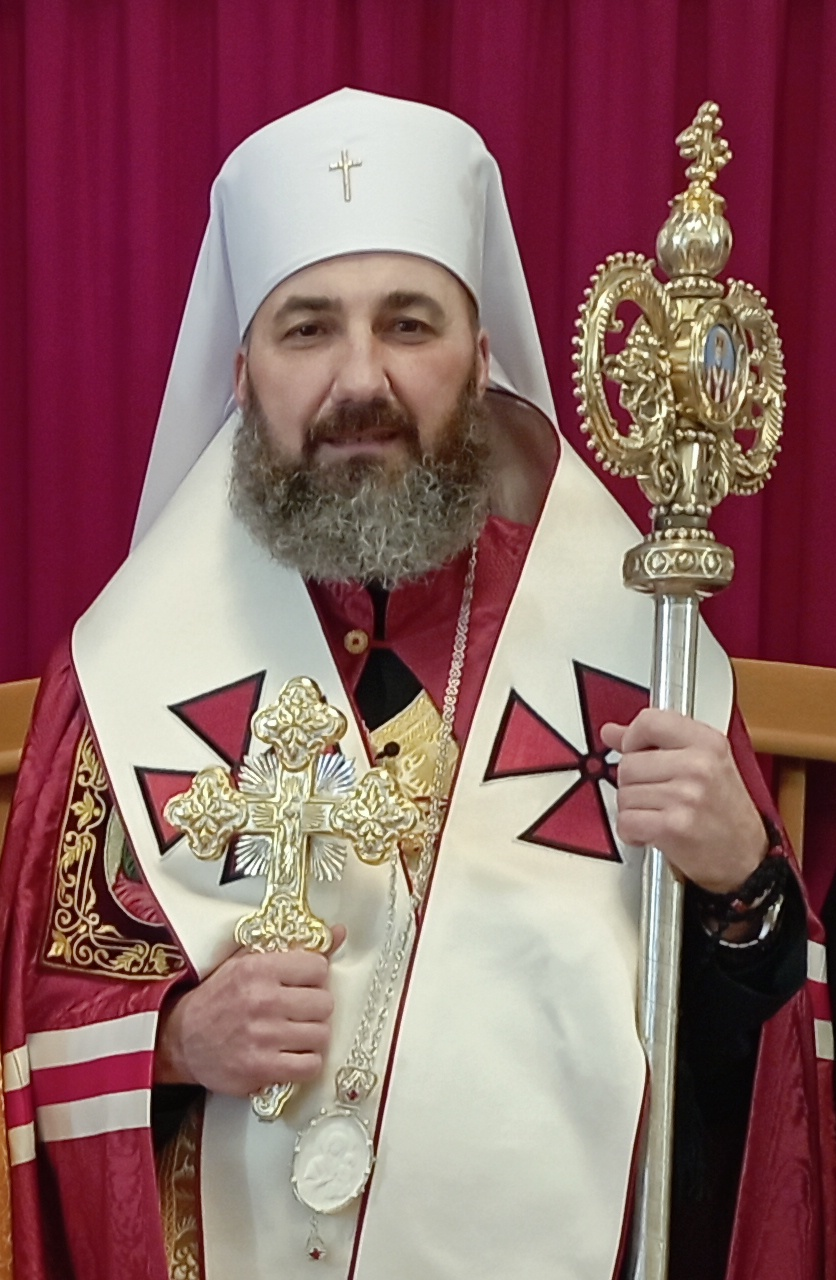
- Archbishop and Metropolitan Jonáš of Prešov
- Church: Slovak Greek Catholic Church
- Appointed: 26 October 2023
- Predecessor: Peter Rusnák (Apostolic Administrator)
- Previous post: Hegumen of Univ Lavra of the Studite Rite (2020–2023)

Orders
- Ordination: 11 July 1998 (Priest) by Ján Hirka
- Consecration: 27 January 2024 (Bishop) by Cyril Vasiľ

Personal details
- Born: Jozef Maxim; 21 November 1974 (age 51) Levoča, Czechoslovakia
- Coat of arms

Jonáš Jozef Maxim (born 21 November 1974) is a Slovak Greek Catholic hierarch, who serves as a second Archieparch of Prešov and the head of the Greek Catholic sui iuris Church in Slovakia (since 26 October 2023).

== Early life and studies ==
Archbishop Maxim (his given name was Jozef; Jonáš is his monastic name) was born in Levoča and grew up in the village and obec Oľšavica of the Levoča District in the Greek-Catholic family with six children. After graduation of the gymnasium, he began his studies at the Greek Catholic Faculty of Theology at the University of Prešov and in February 1994 he continued his studies at the Major Theological Seminary in Prešov, where completed his philosophical and theological studies in 1998 with a Master of Theology degree.

== Later career ==
He was ordained as a deacon on 13 June 1998 and as a priest on 11 July 1998. Both ordinations were made by Bishop Ján Hirka for then the Eparchy of Prešov, and Fr. Maxim continued his studies at the Pontifical Oriental Institute in Rome, where he received a licentiate in 2000. From 2001 to 2004 he was spiritual director at the Major Theological Seminary in Prešov and, from 2002 to 2004, was an assistant at the Department of Systematic Theology of the Greek Catholic Faculty of Theology of Prešov University.

On 24 September 2004 he joined the Ukrainian Studite Monks and made a religious profession in the Univ Lavra on 5 March 2006, after completed the novitiate and a little schime on 22 May 2008. During 2009–2010 he served as a superior of St. Andrew hermitage in Luzhky, from 2010 until 2011 as a novice master in the Univ Lavra and from 2011 until 2013 as a superior of St. Michael monastery in Lviv and then continued his studies at the Pontifical Oriental Institute in Rome with Doctor of Theology degree in the Eastern Ecclesiastical Studies in 2017.

After returning to Ukraine, Fr. Maxim again served as a superior of St. Michael monastery in Lviv from 2018 until 2020, when he was elected as a Hegumen of Univ Holy Dormition Lavra of the Studite Rite.

== Archbishop ==
On 26 October 2023 Fr. Maxim was appointed by Pope Francis as the second Metropolitan Archbishop of Prešov and the head of the Slovak Greek Catholic sui iuris. He was consecrated as an Archbishop by archbishop Cyril Vasiľ and co-consecrators: bishop Peter Rusnák and bishop Venedykt Aleksiychuk at the Cathedral of Saint John the Baptist in Prešov on 27 January 2024.

Catholic Church titles
Preceded by Illya Mamchak	Hegumen of the Univ Holy Dormition Lavra of the Studite Rite; 2020–2023	Succeeded by Josaphat Voytek
Preceded by Peter Rusnák (Apostolic Administrator)	Metropolitan Archbishop of Prešov; 2023–present	Succeeded by Incumbent
