= Oleksandr Stoyka =

Greek Catholic hierarch

- Bishop of Mukachevo
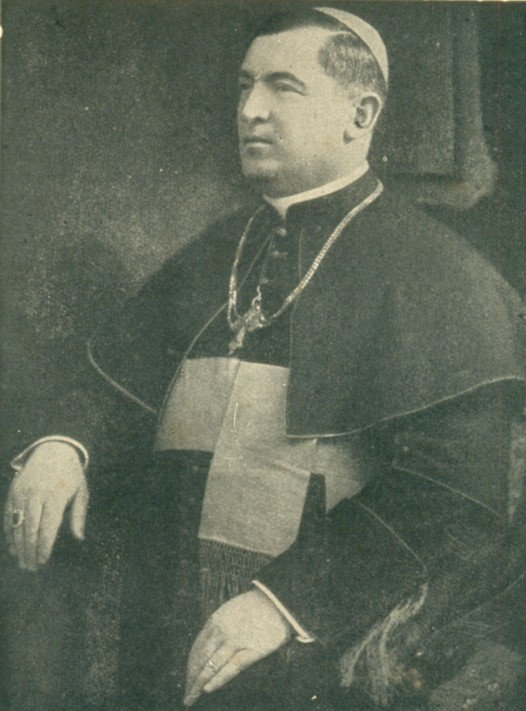
- Native name: Олександр Стойка
- Church: Ruthenian Greek Catholic Church
- Diocese: Eparchy of Mukachevo
- In office: 3 May 1932 – 31 May 1943
- Predecessor: Petro Gebey
- Successor: Alexander Chira

Orders
- Ordination: 17 December 1916 by Antal Papp
- Consecration: 12 July 1932 by Pavel Peter Gojdič

Personal details
- Born: 16 October 1890 Karácsfalva, Kingdom of Hungary, Transleithania, Austria-Hungary
- Died: 31 May 1943 (aged 52) Uzhhorod, Kingdom of Hungary

Oleksandr Stoyka (Ukrainian: Олександр Стойка, Rusyn: Александер Стойка, Hungarian: Sztojka Sándor; 16 October 1890 – 31 May 1943) was a Ruthenian Greek Catholic hierarch. He was bishop of the Ruthenian Catholic Eparchy of Mukacheve from 1932 to 1943.

Born in Karachyn, Austria-Hungary (present day – Ukraine) in 1890 into a Ruthenianized Romanian noble family, he was ordained a priest on 17 December 1916. He was appointed the Bishop by the Holy See on 3 May 1932. He was consecrated to the Episcopate on 12 July 1932. The principal consecrator was Blessed Bishop Pavel Peter Gojdič, and the principal co-consecrators were Bishop Józef Cársky and Bishop Ivan Bucko.

He died in Uzhhorod on 31 May 1943.

Catholic Church titles
Preceded by Petro Gebey	Ruthenian Catholic Bishop of Mukacheve; 1932–1943	Succeeded by Blessed Theodore Romzha
