= Mikuláš Klimčák =

Slovak painter

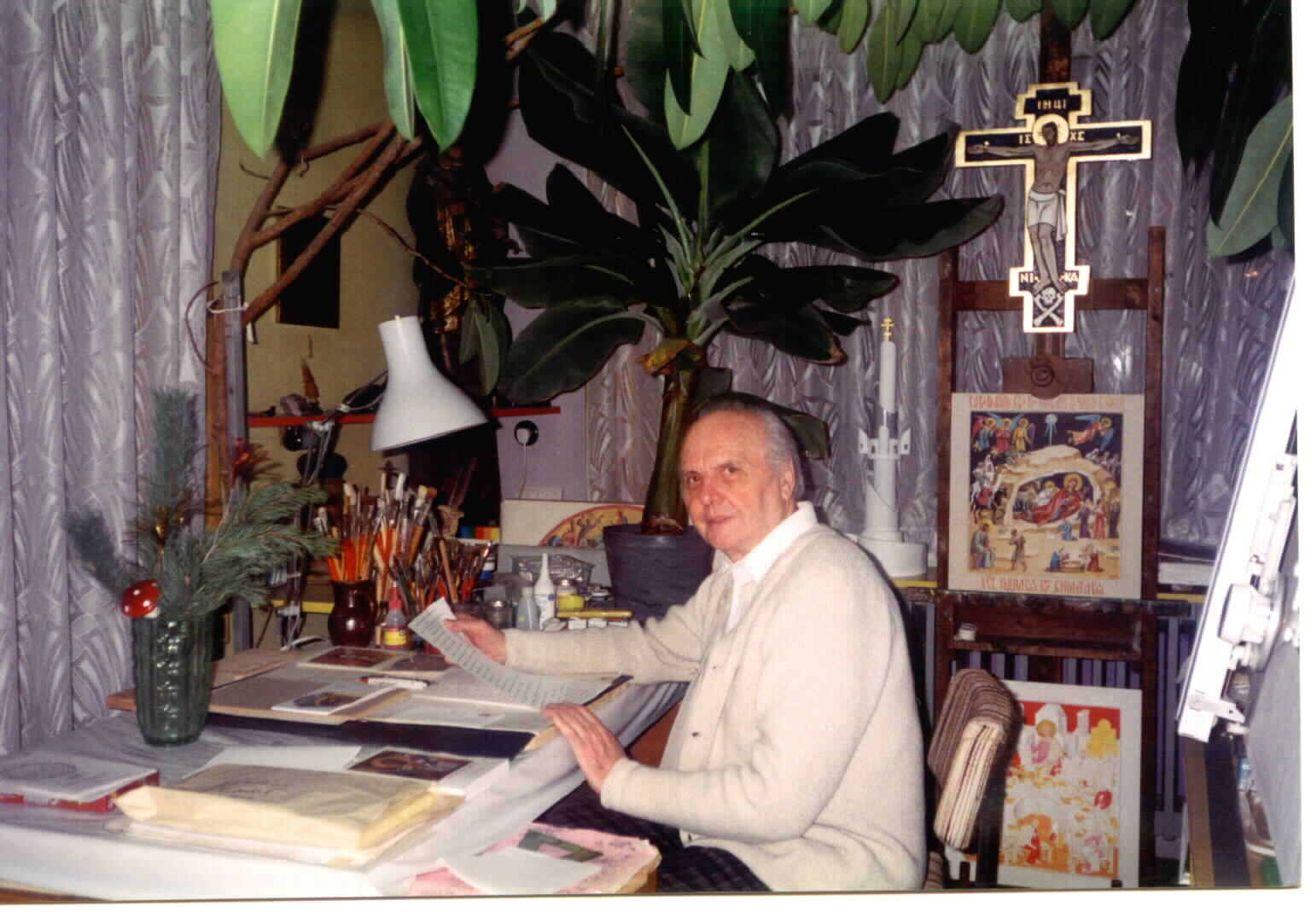
- Born: 16 November 1921; Humenné, Slovakia
- Died: 2 March 2016 (aged 94); Bratislava, Slovakia
- Awards: Knight of the Order of St. Sylvester

Mikuláš Klimčák (16 November 1921 – 2 March 2016) was a Slovak iconographer, artist and philosopher.

== Life ==
Klimčák was born into a Greek-Catholic family in the city of Humenné. Between 1943 and 1945, Klimčák studied at the Department of Drawing and Painting at the Slovak Technical University in Bratislava. In 1948 he graduated from the Academy of Arts, Architecture and Design in Prague.

Inside the Basilica of the Dormition of the Holy Mother of God, the largest Greek-Catholic Marian shrine, are paintings and icons by Klimčák.

== Death ==
On 2 March 2016, Mikuláš Klimčák passed away. Eight days later, on 10 March 2016, a Requiem Divine Liturgy was said for Mikuláš Klimčák by Bishop Peter Rusnák; after he was buried in the Andrew's Cemetery, near the cathedral, which he was said to have regularly visited.

== Legacy ==
On 3 December 2021, the Slovakian Government issued two stamps in honour of Klimčák.

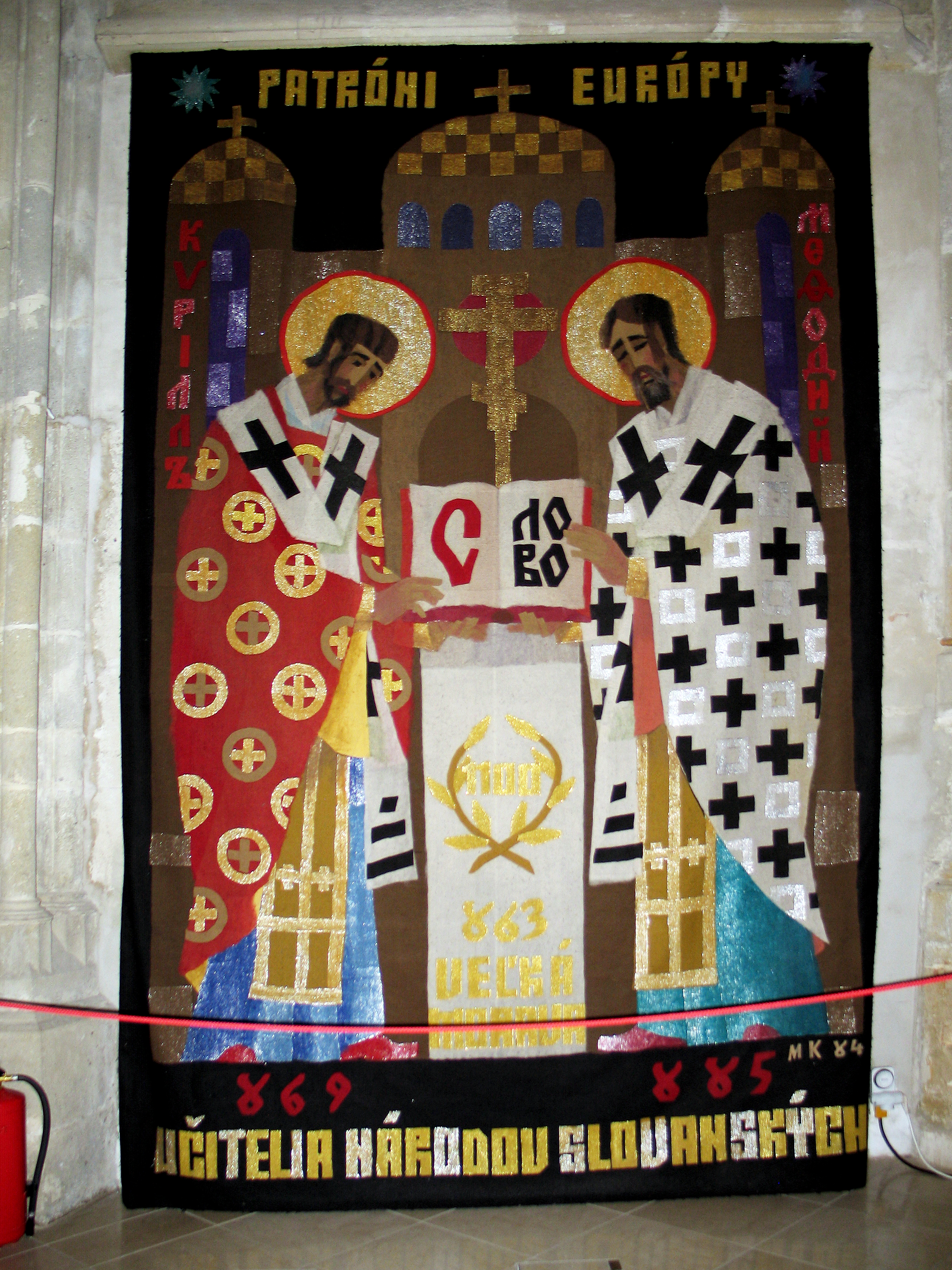
Tapestry of Ss. Cyril and Methodius

== Awards ==
In 2003, Klimčák was awarded the Fra Angelico Award from the Council for Science, Education and Culture of the Conference of Bishops of Slovakia. In 2007, Klimčák was made a Knight of the Order of St. Sylvester by Pope Benedict XVI.
