= Milan Lach =

Slovak Jesuit and Greek Catholic bishop

His Grace, The Most Reverend Milan Lach S.J.
- Eparch of Bratislava; Titular Bishop of Ostracine
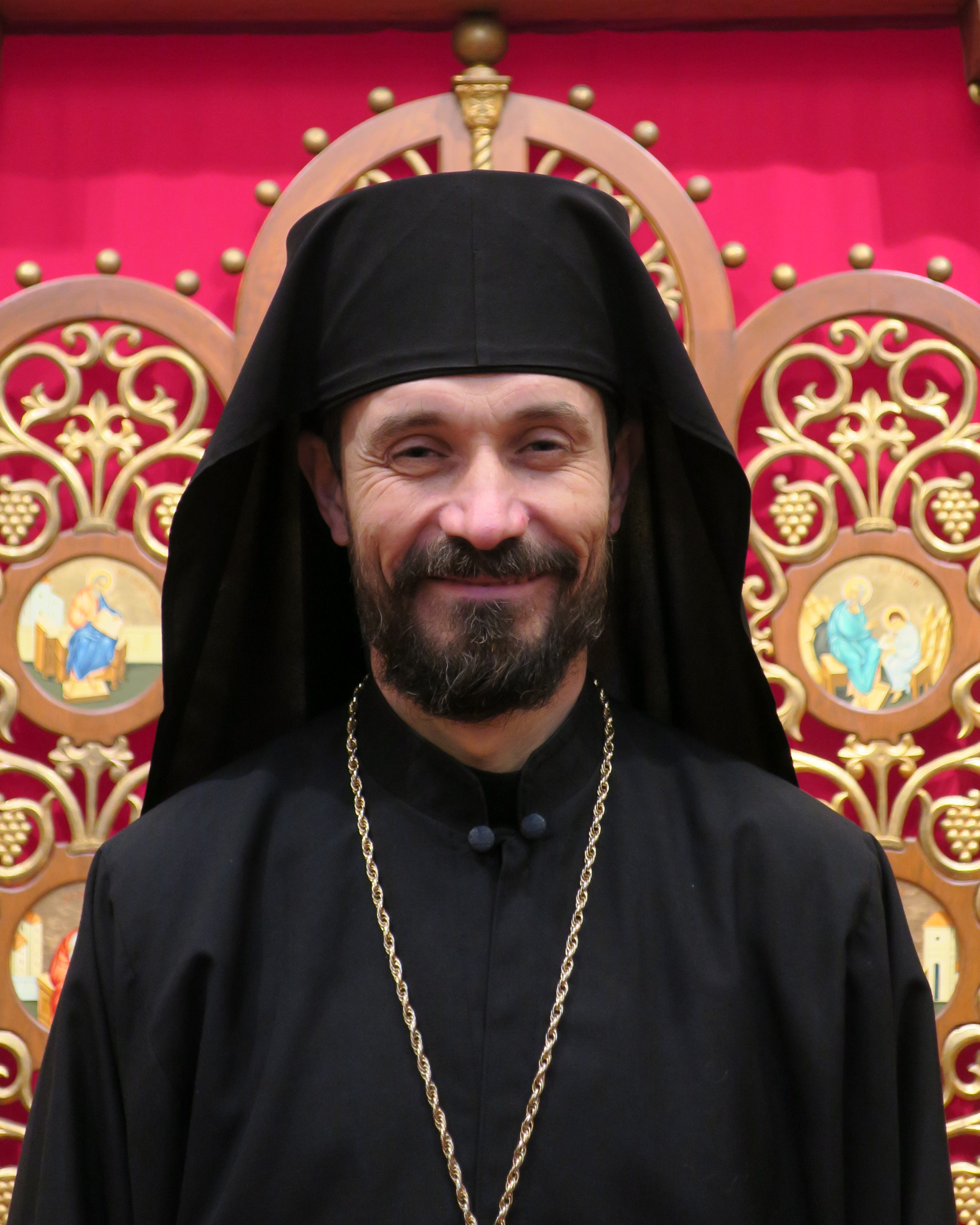
- Bishop Milan Lach at St. John the Baptist Cathedral in Parma, Ohio
- Appointed: March 6, 2026
- Predecessor: Peter Rusnak
- Previous posts: Auxiliary Bishop of Bratislava (2023-2026); Bishop of Parma (2018-2023); Auxiliary Eparch of Prešov and Titular Eparch of Ostracine (2013-2018)

Orders
- Ordination: July 1, 2001 by Bishop Milan Chautur, CSsR
- Consecration: June 1, 2013 by Metropolitan Ján Babjak, SJ

Personal details
- Born: November 18, 1973 (age 52) Kežmarok, Czechoslovak Socialist Republic
- Motto: Servite ("Serve")
- Coat of arms

Styles of Milan Lach
- Reference style: His Grace; The Most Reverend
- Spoken style: His Grace
- Religious style: Eparch

Milan Lach, SJ (born November 18, 1973) is a Slovak Catholic bishop, current eparch of Bratislava of the Slovak Greek Catholic Church. He was previously the Eparch of Parma in the Ruthenian Greek Catholic Church (2018 - 2023), titular bishop of Ostracine (2013 - 2018 and 2023 - 2026) and auxiliary bishop of Prešov (2013 - 2018) and Bratislava (2023 - 2026).

== Life ==
He was born on November 18, 1973, in Kežmarok, a town in the Spiš region of eastern Slovakia.

He studied theology at the TF TU in Bratislava. Lach was ordained a deacon on 11 November 2000, and a priest 1 July 2001, in the Cathedral of the Nativity of the Mother of God in Košice, both by the Eparchal Bishop of Košice Milan Chautur.

From 2001 to 2002, he performed a civilian service in the Jesuit community in Košice and in 2003 he worked at East-West Spirituality Center as a scientist. From 2003 to 2004, he was appointed a head of the East-West Spirituality Center in Košice and at the same time he helped Christians and others in Košice and the surrounding area of Košice.

In 2004, he began his studies at the Pontifical Oriental Institute in Rome, where he obtained a doctorate in 2009. In addition to his experience from the international academic environment, he has also gained experience in spiritual service as a helping hand at the Pontifical College of Russicum and as a spiritual assistant of the Federation of Scouts of Europe in Rome. He also co-authored with Vatican Radio.

After returning from studies in Rome in 2009, he worked as a director at the Center of Spirituality East-West. In addition to securing the scientific tasks of the center, organizing scientific conferences, building a library fund and establishing contacts with other countries institute, he taught one semester at the Faculty of Theology of the Catholic University in Košice, where he also was a member of a theological journal Verba Theologica.

He has been in the Society of Jesus in Slovakia since December 30, 2009. He was a provincial counselor and since January 1, 2012, a delegate for the formation of Jesuit scholastics.

He is fluent in Slovak and Italian, actively communicates in English and Russian and passively in French.

On April 19, 2013, Pope Francis appointed him as an Auxiliary Bishop of Prešov. He was ordained on June 1, 2013, in Ľutina.

On June 24, 2017, he was appointed by Pope Francis as Apostolic Administrator of the Eparchy of Parma for Byzantines in the United States. On June 1, 2018, Pope Francis named Lach as Eparch of Parma. He was enthroned one month later on July 1.

On January 23, 2023, Pope Francis name him as the auxiliary bishop of the Slovak Catholic Eparchy of Bratislava and titular bishop of Ostracine.

In 2024 he was appointed as apostolic visitor for Slovak Greek Catholic faithful in Western Europe.

On March 6, 2026, he was appointed as the bishop (eparch) of the Eparchy of Bratislava.

== See also ==
- Catholic Church hierarchy
- Catholic Church in the United States
- Historical list of the Catholic bishops of the United States
- List of Catholic bishops of the United States
- Lists of patriarchs, archbishops, and bishops

== Episcopal succession ==
Catholic Church titles
Preceded by Peter Rusnák	Eparch of Bratislava for the Byzantines; 2026–present	Succeeded by Incumbent
Preceded by -	Auxiliary Eparch of Bratislava for the Byzantines; 2023–2026	Succeeded by -
Preceded by John Michael Kudrick	Eparch of Parma for the Byzantines; 2018–2023	Succeeded by Robert Mark Pipta
Preceded by -	Auxiliary Eparch of Prešov; 2013–2017	Succeeded by -
