= Basil Hopko =

Slovak Greek Catholic bishop

Blessed Basil Hopko
- Auxiliary Bishop of Prešov
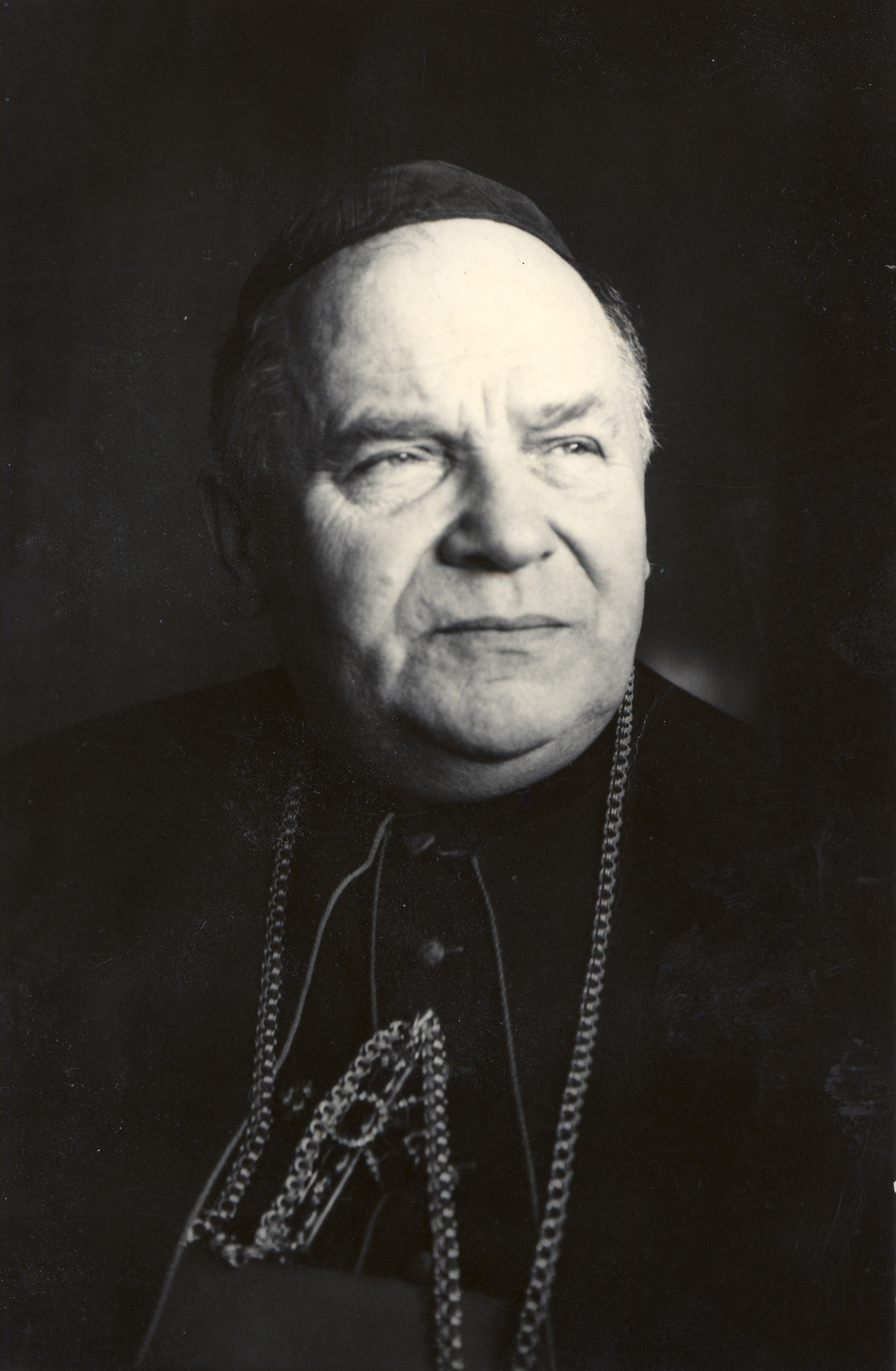
- Hopko in 1967.
- Church: Slovak Greek Catholic Church
- Diocese: Prešov
- See: Prešov
- Appointed: 9 November 1946
- Term ended: 23 July 1976
- Successor: Milan Chautur
- Other post: Titular Bishop of Midila (1946-76)

Orders
- Ordination: 3 February 1929 by Pavel Peter Gojdic
- Consecration: 11 May 1947 by Pavel Peter Gojdic

Personal details
- Born: Vasil Hopko; 21 April 1904 Geréb, Sáros, Kingdom of Hungary, Austria-Hungary
- Died: 23 July 1976 (aged 72) Prešov, Czechoslovakia
- Coat of arms: Basil Hopko's coat of arms

Sainthood
- Feast day: 23 July
- Venerated in: Slovak Greek Catholic Church; Roman Catholic Church
- Beatified: 14 September 2003; Saint Peter's Square, Vatican City by Pope John Paul II
- Attributes: Episcopal attire

Basil or Vasiľ Hopko (21 April 1904, Hrabské — 23 July 1976) was an eparch (bishop) of the Slovak Greek Catholic Church. He was beatified by Pope John Paul II on 14 September 2003 for his martyrdom under Communist occupation.

== Life ==
Basil Hopko was born in the Rusyn village of Hrabské, in the Sáros County of the Kingdom of Hungary (present-day eastern Slovakia). His parents, Basil and Anna née Petrenko, were landless peasants. While Hopko was still an infant, his father was struck by lightning and died. His mother left him in care of her father, while she emigrated to the United States in search of work. When Hopko was 7 he was sent to live with his uncle Demeter Petrenko, a Greek Catholic priest.

He attended the Evangelical gymnasium in Prešov, then Czechoslovakia, graduating with honors in 1923. Hopko studied at the Eparchial Seminary in Prešov. He had dreams of joining his mother in America, and of pursuing his priestly vocation there, but the cost of recurring health problems left him unable to afford to travel. He later wrote that when he finally decided to stay and to serve in his homeland, he was suddenly cured, and realized he had been given a sign about his calling. He was ordained a Greek Catholic priest on 3 February 1929.

He served as a pastor (1929–1936) at the Greek Catholic parish in Prague, the Czechoslovak capital, where he was known for his focus on the poor, the unemployed, and students. His mother returned from America after 22 years and rejoined her son in Prague, becoming his housekeeper at the parish rectory.

In 1936 he returned to teach in Prešov's Eparchial Seminary, and was awarded the title of monsignor. He had already begun graduate studies at Charles University while in Prague, and he completed his Doctor of Theology in 1940 at Comenius University in Bratislava. In Prešov he headed the eparchy's publishing division, where he edited a monthly periodical.

After World War II, a growing Soviet Communist influence caused Bishop Pavol Peter Gojdič of Prešov to ask the Holy See for an Auxiliary Bishop to help defend the Greek Catholic Church. Hopko was appointed to the post on 11 May 1947. The Communist take-over of Czechoslovakia wrought havoc on the Greek Catholic Church. In 1950 it was officially abolished by the state as a religious organization, and its assets were turned over to the Russian Orthodox Church. Bishop Gojdič was arrested and was imprisoned for life. Bishop Hopko was arrested on 28 April 1950 and kept on starvation rations and tortured for weeks. Eventually he was tried and sentenced to 15 years for the "subversive activity" of staying loyal to Rome. He was repeatedly transferred from prison to prison. His health, physical and emotional, failed, and in 1964 he was transferred to a home for the aged. He never recovered his health.

During the Prague Spring the Czechoslovak government legally cleared Hopko on 13 June 1968 and the Prešov Eparchy was restored. However, activists insisted that a Slovak bishop be appointed to the see, and the Holy See named the Slovak priest Ján Hirka as Bishop Hopko's successor.

Bishop Hopko died in Prešov at age 72 on 23 July 1976. He was buried at the Cathedral of Saint John the Baptist, Prešov. On 14 September 2003 Pope John Paul II beatified him at a ceremony in Bratislava, Slovakia.

== Bibliography ==
- Athanasius Pekar, Bishop Basil Hopko, S.T.D., Confessor of the Faith (1904-1976) (Pittsburgh: Byzantine Seminary Press Publications, 1979)
- A Plea for your prayers! for the Canonization of the servants of God, Bishop Theodore G. Romzha, Bishop Peter Paul Gojdich, Bishop Basil Hopko (Pittsburgh: Office for the Cause of Canonization, Archbishop's Chancery, 1986)
- Bishop Basil Hopko: Our "Prisoner for the Lord" (Pittsburgh: Byzantine Seminary Press, 1987)
