= Cathedral of the Exaltation of the Holy Cross, Bratislava =

Cathedral in Slovakia

Coordinates: 48°08′52″N 17°07′17″E

Cathedral Church of the Exaltation of the Holy Cross Katedrálny chrám Povýšenia vznešeného a životodarného kríža
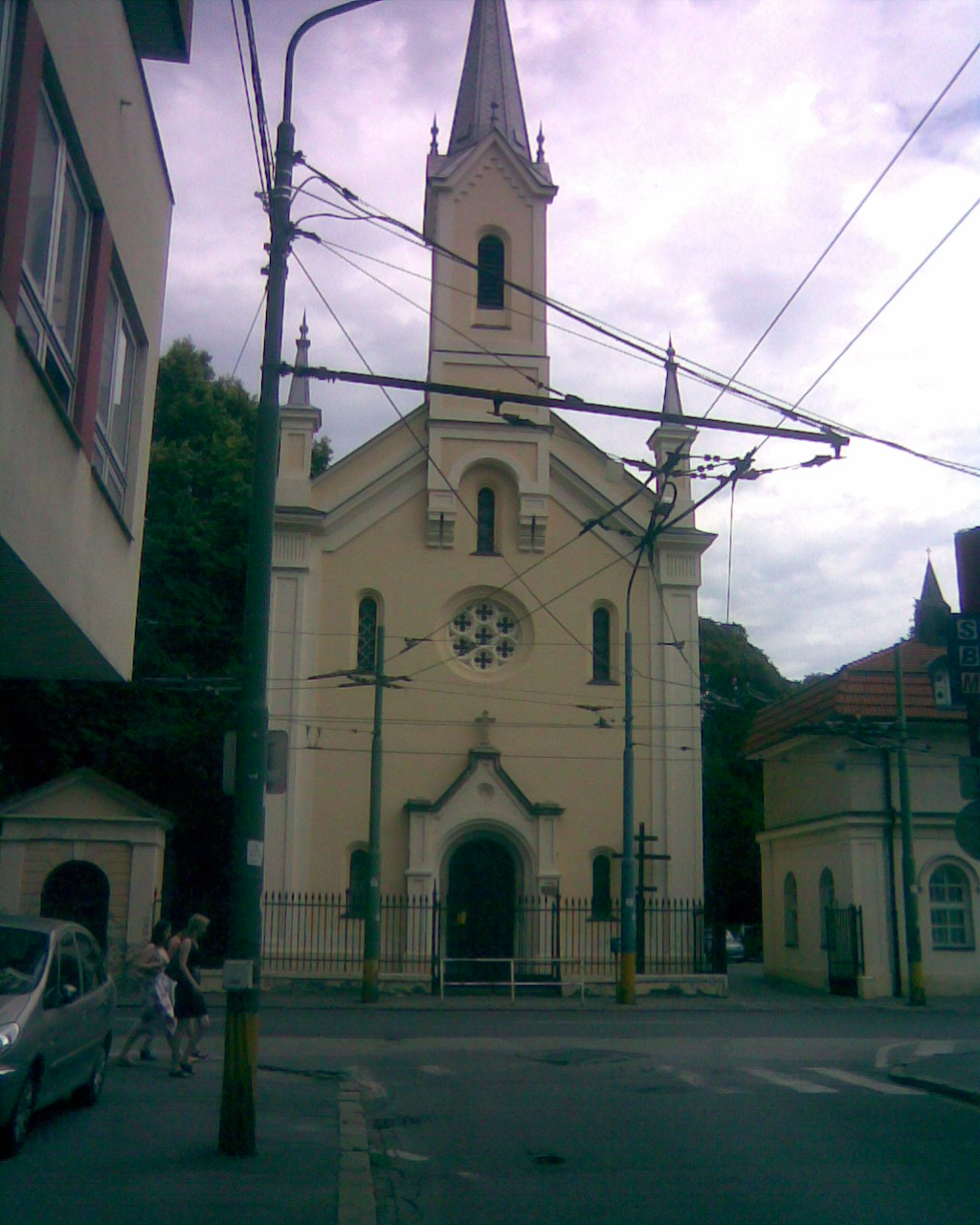
- Main facade of the church

Religion
- Affiliation: Slovak Greek Catholic Church
- Ecclesiastical or organizational status: Cathedral
- Year consecrated: 1860

Location
- Location: Old Town borough of Bratislava, Slovakia
- Interactive map of Cathedral Church of the Exaltation of the Holy Cross; Katedrálny chrám Povýšenia vznešeného a životodarného kríža

Architecture
- Architect: Ignác Feigler jr.
- Type: Neo-Renaissance with neo-Gothic features
- Completed: 1860

Website
- English homepage Gréckokatolícky farský úrad Bratislava Ul. 29. augusta No. 7, 811 08, Bratislava

The Church of the Exaltation of the Holy Cross (Slovak: Chrám Povýšenia vznešeného a životodarného kríža) is a cathedral in Bratislava, Slovakia. It was built in the year 1860 at the edge of St. Andrew's cemetery (Ondrejský cintorín). Since 1972, the church belongs to Slovak Greek Catholic Church. It is the cathedral church of the Eparchy of Bratislava since 2008.

== History ==
The founding stone was laid on May 13, 1859. The church was consecrated by Archbishop of Esztergom, cardinal János Scitovszky (Slovak: Ján Scitovský) on September 14, 1860.

Today, liturgy is both in Slovak and Old Church Slavonic.

== See also ==
- List of cathedrals in Slovakia
- Old Town, Bratislava
