= Kostiantyn Sabov =

- Administrator of Mukachevo
- Church: Ruthenian Greek Catholic Church
- Diocese: Eparchy of Mukachevo
- In office: 18 June 1977 – 18 November 1982
- Predecessor: Alexander Chira
- Successor: Ivan Semedi

Orders
- Ordination: 7 November 1956 by Alexander Chira
- Consecration: 18 June 1977 by Alexander Chira

Personal details
- Born: 4 January 1926 Simerky, Czechoslovakia
- Died: 18 November 1982 (aged 56) Uzhhorod, Ukrainian SSR, Soviet Union

Kostiantyn Sabov (Ukrainian: Костянтин Сабов; 4 January 1926 – 18 November 1982) was a Ruthenian Greek Catholic clandestine hierarch. He was an auxiliary bishop of the Ruthenian Catholic Eparchy of Mukacheve from 1977 to 1982.

Born in Simerky, Czechoslovakia (present day – Ukraine) in 1926, he was clandestinely ordained a priest on 7 November 1956 by Bishop Alexander Chira for the Ruthenian Catholic Eparchy of Mukacheve. He never served openly as priest, because the Communist regime abolished the Greek-Catholic Church. On 16 July 1977 was consecrated to the Episcopate as auxiliary bishop. The principal and single consecrator was clandestine bishop Alexander Chira.

He died on 18 November 1982.
