= Petro Gebey =

Bishop

- Bishop of Mukachevo
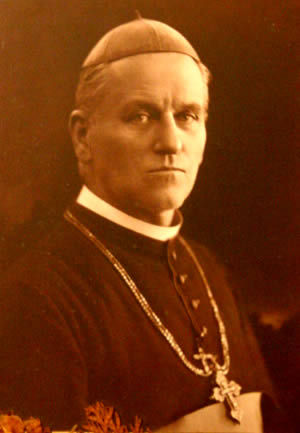
- Native name: Петро Гебей
- Church: Ruthenian Greek Catholic Church
- Diocese: Eparchy of Mukachevo
- In office: 16 July 1924 – 26 April 1931
- Predecessor: Antal Papp
- Successor: Oleksandr Stoyka

Orders
- Ordination: 13 October 1889 by Ivan Pasteliy
- Consecration: 3 August 1924 by Dionisije Njaradi

Personal details
- Born: 20 July 1864 Kal'nyk, Kingdom of Hungary, Austrian Empire
- Died: 26 April 1931 (aged 66) Uzhhorod, Czechoslovakia

Petro Gebey (Ukrainian: Петро Ґебей, Hungarian: Gebé Péter; 20 July 1864 – 26 April 1931) was a Ruthenian Greek Catholic hierarch. He was bishop of the Ruthenian Catholic Eparchy of Mukacheve from 1924 to 1931.

== Biography ==
Born in Kalnyk, Austrian Empire (present day – Zakarpattia Oblast, Ukraine) in 1864, he was ordained a priest on 13 October 1889. He was appointed the Bishop by the Holy See on 16 July 1924. He was consecrated to the Episcopate on 3 August 1924. The principal consecrator was Bishop Dionizije Njaradi, and the principal co-consecrators were Blessed Bishop Josaphat Kotsylovsky and Bishop Karol Józef Fischer.

He died in Uzhhorod on 26 April 1931.

== See also ==
- Ruthenian Greek Catholic Church

Catholic Church titles
Preceded by Antal Papp	Ruthenian Catholic Bishop of Mukacheve; 1924–1931	Succeeded by Oleksandr Stoyka
