= Alexander Chira =

Eastern Catholic bishop

- Administrator of Mukachevo
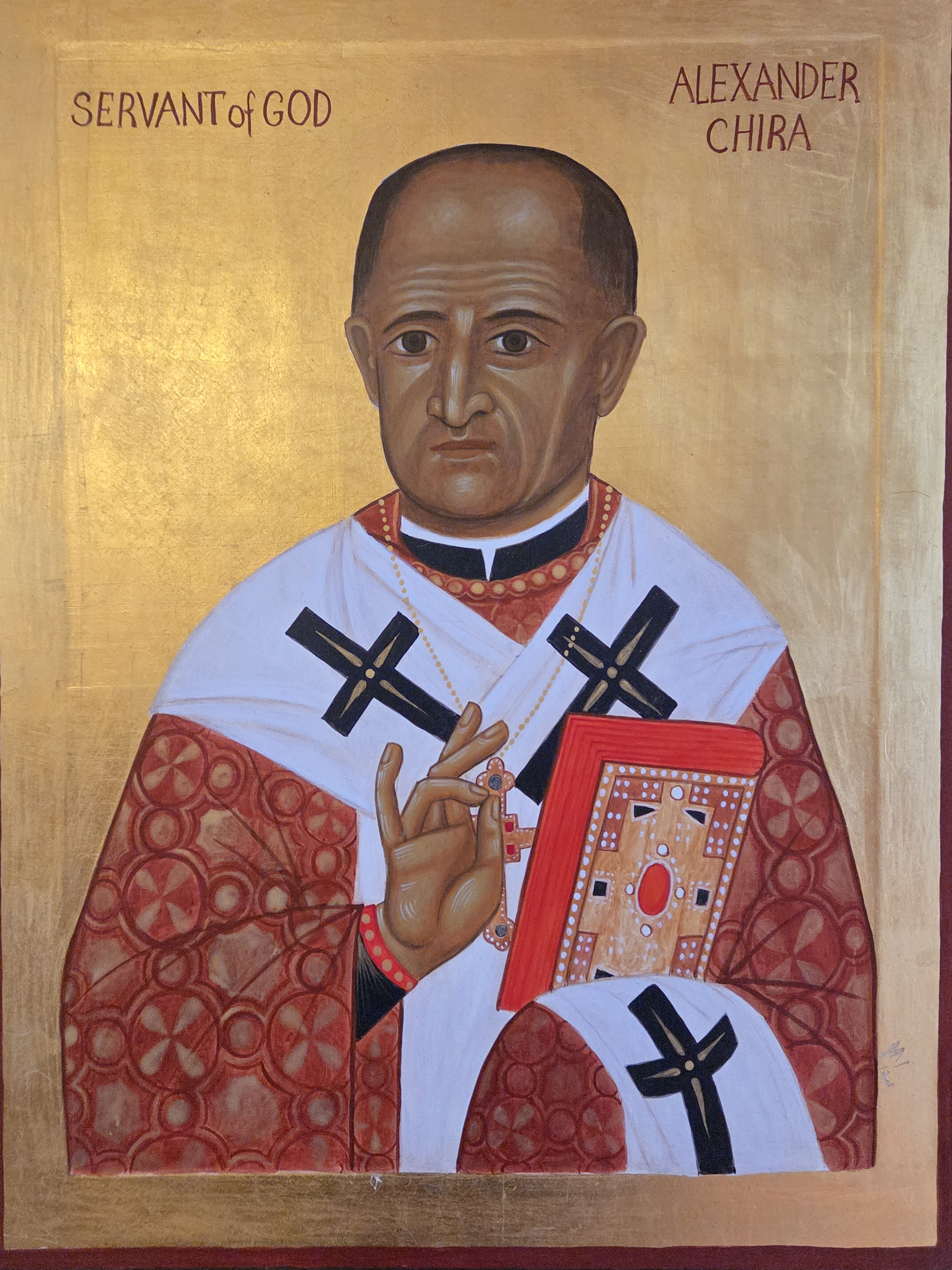
- Byzantine Catholic Icon of Alexander Chira
- Native name: Олекса́ндр Хіра
- Church: Ruthenian Greek Catholic Church
- Diocese: Eparchy of Mukachevo
- In office: 1 November 1947 – 18 June 1977
- Predecessor: Oleksandr Stoyka
- Successor: Kostiantyn Sabov
- Other post: Auxiliary Bishop of Mukachevo (1945-1983)

Orders
- Ordination: 18 December 1920 by Antal Papp
- Consecration: 30 December 1945 by Theodore Romzha

Personal details
- Born: 17 January 1897 Vilkhivtsi, Máramaros County, Kingdom of Hungary, Transleithania, Austria-Hungary
- Died: 26 May 1983 (aged 86) Karaganda, Kazakh SSR, Soviet Union

Bishop Alexander Chira was a bishop of the Ruthenian Catholic Church. His immediate predecessor was Bishop Theodore G. Romzha. He is designated as a Confessor of the Faith.

== Personal information ==
Chira was born January 17, 1897, in the village of Irhóc, Máramaros County (Vilhivci/Vilʹkhivtsi/Olkhovtsy). He was ordained as a priest in Uzhorod in December, 1920. His death was in exile on May 26, 1983, in the city of Karaganda, Kazakhstan.

Chira "was one of the many victims of the Soviet persecution of the Greek Catholic Church." While in a concentration camp in 1956, Chira clandestinely was appointed a bishop.

== See also ==
- anti-Catholicism
- History of the Catholic Church
- Persecution of Christians
- Roman Catholicism in Romania
- Roman Catholicism in Ukraine
