= Ľubovec =

Municipality in Slovakia

- Municipality
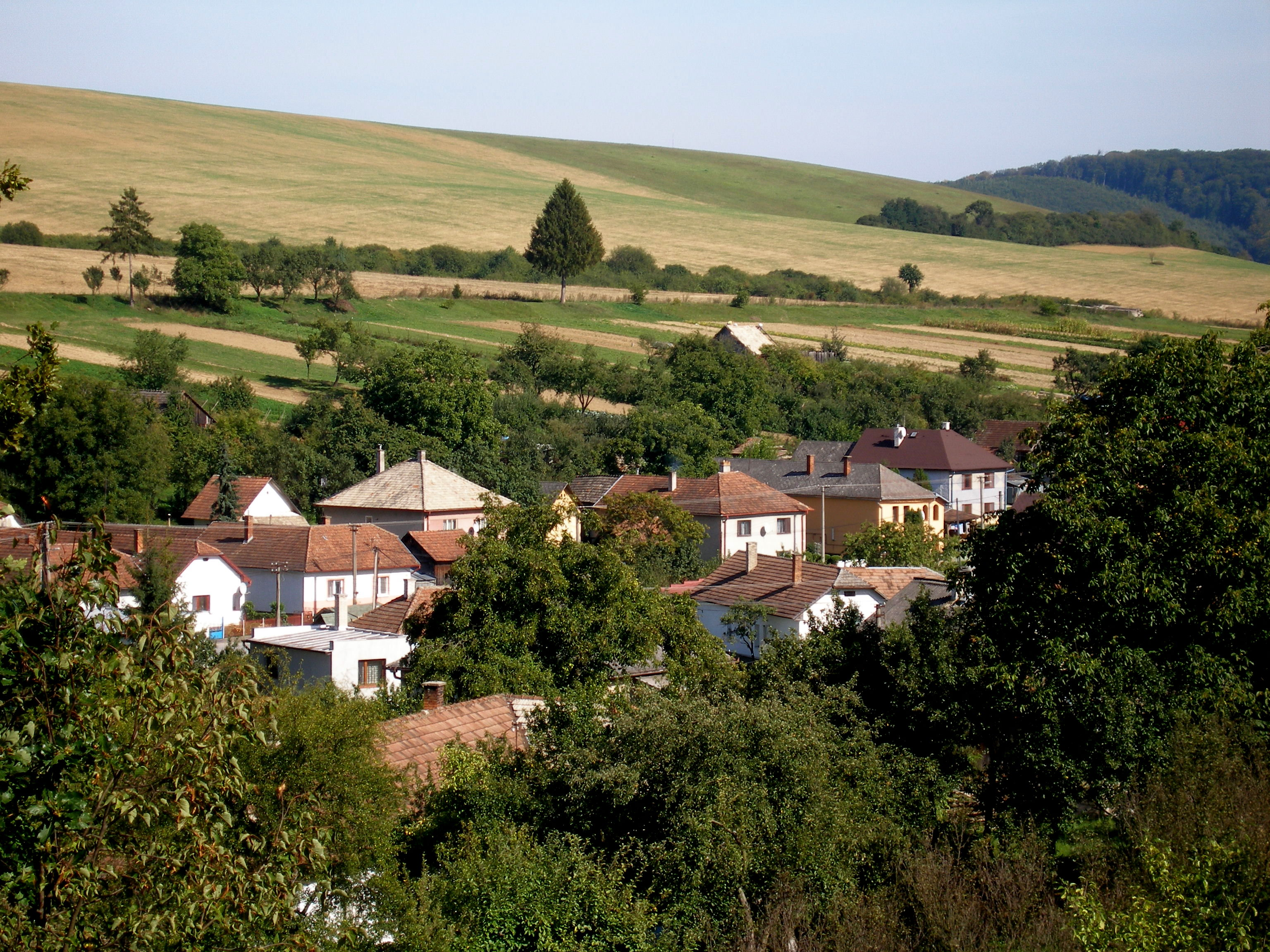

- Flag

- Location of Ľubovec in the Prešov Region Location of Ľubovec in Slovakia
- Coordinates: 48.91°N 21.18°E
- Country: Slovakia
- Region: Prešov Region
- District: Prešov District
- First mentioned: 1337

Area
  - Total: 15.45 km^{2} (5.97 sq mi)
- Elevation: 320 m (1,050 ft)

Population (2025)
  - Total: 545
- Time zone: UTC+1 (CET)
  - Summer (DST): UTC+2 (CEST)
- Postal code: 824 2
- Area code: +421 51
- Vehicle registration plate (until 2022): PO
- Website: www.lubovec.sk

Ľubovec (Rusyn: Любовець) is a village and municipality in Prešov District in the Prešov Region of eastern Slovakia.

== History ==
In historical records the village was first mentioned in 1285.

== Geography ==
The municipality lies at an altitude of 320 metres (1,050 ft) and covers an area of 15.45 km^{2} (5.97 sq mi) (2025).

== Population ==
Population statistic (10 years)
Year	1995	2005	2015	2025
Count	497	506	496	545
Difference		+1.81%	−1.97%	+9.87%

Population statistic
Year	2024	2025
Count	525	545
Difference		+3.80%

It has a population of 545 people (31 December 2025).

=== Ethnicity ===
Census 2021 (1+ %)
Ethnicity	Number	Fraction
Slovak	484	97.18%
Other	9	1.8%
Czech	5	1%
Total	498	

In year 2021 was 498 people by ethnicity 484 as Slovak, 9 as Other, 5 as Czech, 4 as Hungarian, 3 as Not found out, 2 as Rusyn, 1 as Ukrainian and 1 as Polish.

Note on population: The difference values of population numbers in the table "Population statistic" and in the sections "Ethnicity" & "Religion" is caused by the use of various statistical methods.

=== Religion ===
Census 2021 (1+ %)
Religion	Number	Fraction
Roman Catholic Church	283	56.83%
Greek Catholic Church	151	30.32%
None	50	10.04%
Evangelical Church	5	1%
Total	498	

In year 2021 was 498 people by religion 283 from Roman Catholic Church, 151 from Greek Catholic Church, 50 from None, 5 from Evangelical Church, 4 from Eastern Orthodox Church, 3 from Islam and 2 from Not found out.
