= Hažín nad Cirochou =

- Municipality
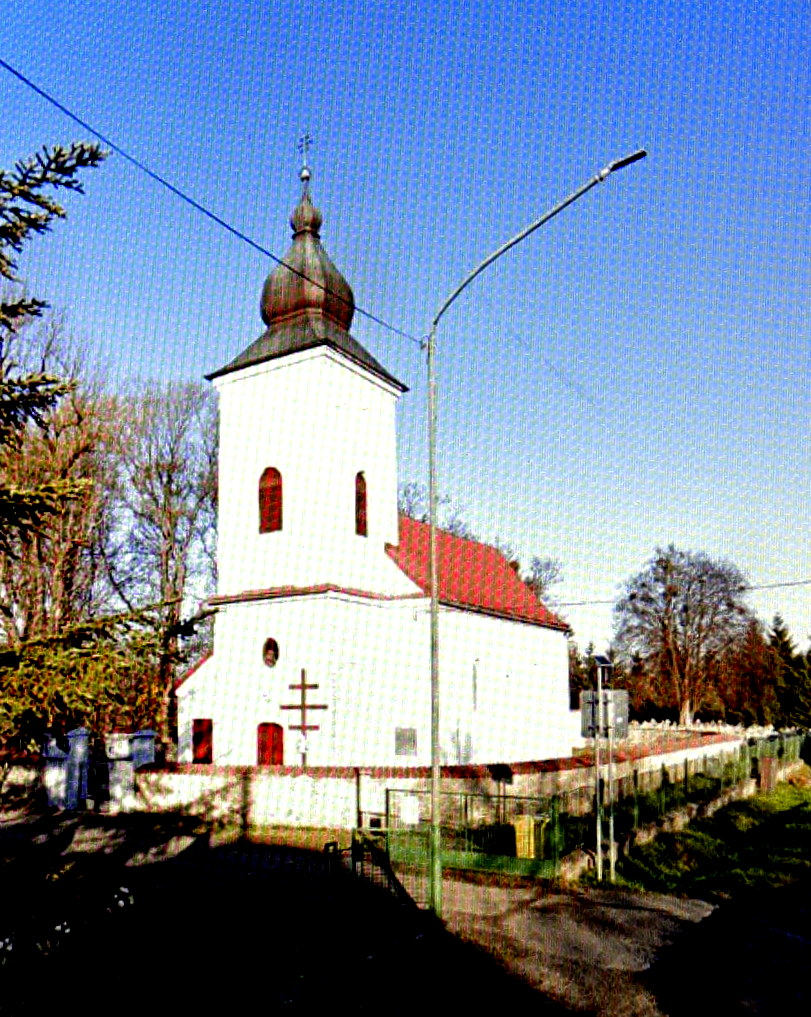

- Flag

- Location of Hažín nad Cirochou in the Prešov Region Location of Hažín nad Cirochou in Slovakia
- Coordinates: 48.93°N 21.97°E
- Country: Slovakia
- Region: Prešov Region
- District: Humenné District
- First mentioned: 1451

Area
  - Total: 7.21 km^{2} (2.78 sq mi)
- Elevation: 167 m (548 ft)

Population (2025)
  - Total: 649
- Time zone: UTC+1 (CET)
  - Summer (DST): UTC+2 (CEST)
- Postal code: 678 3
- Area code: +421 57
- Vehicle registration plate (until 2022): HE
- Website: www.hazinnadcirochou.sk

Hažín nad Cirochou is a village and municipality in Humenné District in the Prešov Region of north-east Slovakia.

== History ==
In historical records the village was first mentioned in 1451.

== Geography ==
The municipality lies at an altitude of 167 metres (548 ft) and covers an area of 7.21 km^{2} (2.78 sq mi) (2025).

== Population ==
Population statistic (10 years)
Year	1995	2005	2015	2025
Count	620	703	674	649
Difference		+13.38%	−4.12%	−3.70%

Population statistic
Year	2024	2025
Count	654	649
Difference		−0.76%

It has a population of 649 people (31 December 2025).

=== Ethnicity ===
Census 2021 (1+ %)
Ethnicity	Number	Fraction
Slovak	658	97.19%
Rusyn	15	2.21%
Not found out	9	1.32%
Total	677	

In year 2021 was 677 people by ethnicity 658 as Slovak, 15 as Rusyn, 9 as Not found out, 6 as Czech, 5 as Ukrainian, 4 as Other and 3 as Hungarian.

Note on population: The difference values of population numbers in the table "Population statistic" and in the sections "Ethnicity" & "Religion" is caused by the use of various statistical methods.

=== Religion ===
Census 2021 (1+ %)
Religion	Number	Fraction
Roman Catholic Church	398	58.79%
Greek Catholic Church	204	30.13%
None	56	8.27%
Not found out	11	1.62%
Total	677	

In year 2021 was 677 people by religion 398 from Roman Catholic Church, 204 from Greek Catholic Church, 56 from None, 11 from Not found out, 5 from Eastern Orthodox Church, 2 from Other and not ascertained christian church and 1 from Evangelical Church.
