= Slovak Catholic Eparchy of Bratislava =

Eparchy of the Slovak Greek Catholic Church in western and central Slovakia

Eparchy of Bratislava Eparchia Bratislaviensis ritus byzantini Bratislavská eparchia
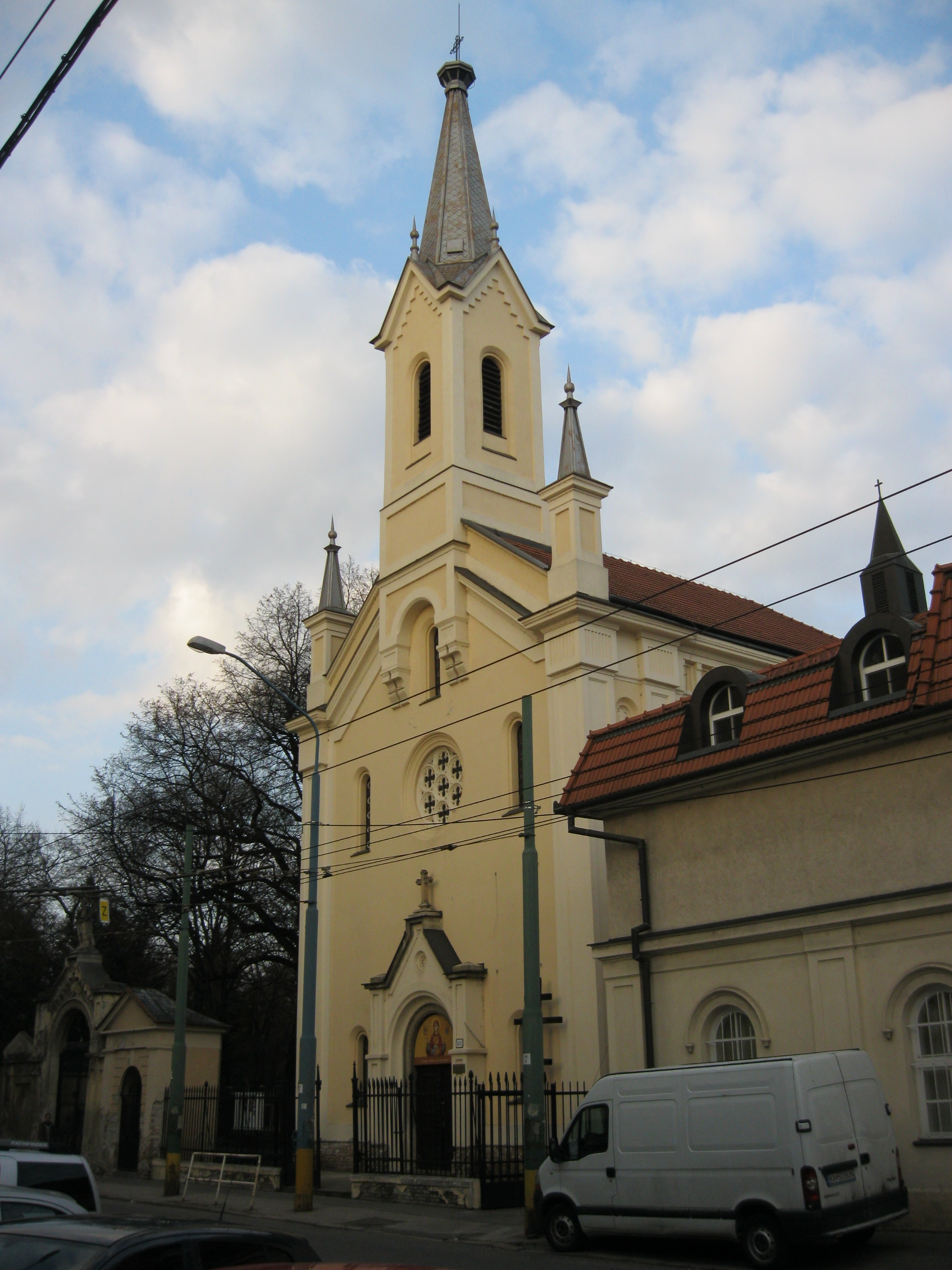
- Slovak Greek Catholic Cathedral of Bratislava

- Coat of arms

Location
- Country: Slovakia
- Ecclesiastical province: Prešov

Statistics
- Population: (as of 2012); 17,069
- Parishes: 15

Information
- Denomination: Catholic Church
- Sui iuris church: Slovak Greek Catholic Church
- Rite: Byzantine Rite
- Established: 30 January 2008
- Cathedral: Cathedral of the Exaltation of the Holy Cross, Bratislava

Current leadership
- Pope: Leo XIV
- Eparch: Milan Lach
- Metropolitan Archbishop: Jonáš Maxim
- Bishops emeritus: Peter Rusnák

Map
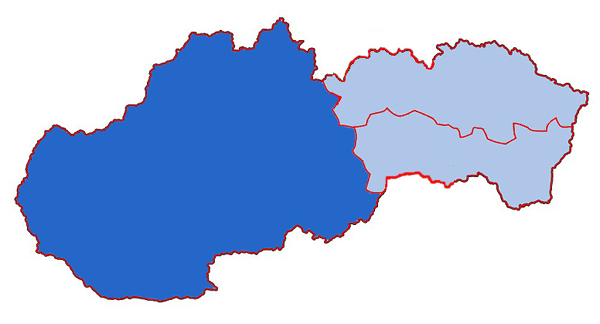

Website
- Website of the Diocese

The Eparchy of Bratislava (Latin: Eparchia Bratislaviensis) is an eparchy (diocese) of the Slovak Greek Catholic Church that is situated in western Slovakia. Its episcopal seat is the Cathedral of the Exaltation of the Holy Cross in the city of Bratislava. The eparchy is a suffragan of the metropolitan Archeparchy of Prešov. The eparchy's territorial remit includes the regions of Bratislava, Trnava, Nitra, Trenčín, Žilina and Banská Bystrica which total around 33,300 km^{2}. As an Eastern Catholic church, it uses the Byzantine Rite in the Slovak and Church Slavonic languages.

== History ==
The eparchy was established on 30 January 2008 by Pope Benedict XVI and its current bishop is Milan Lach. As of 2008, roughly 25,000 Slovak Greek Catholics were under the jurisdiction of the Eparchy of Bratislava.

== List of eparchs ==
1. Peter Rusnák (2008 - 2026)
  - auxiliary bishop Milan Lach, SJ (2023 - 2026)
2. Milan Lach, SJ (since 2026)
