= Abranovce =

Municipality in Prešov Region, Slovakia

- Municipality
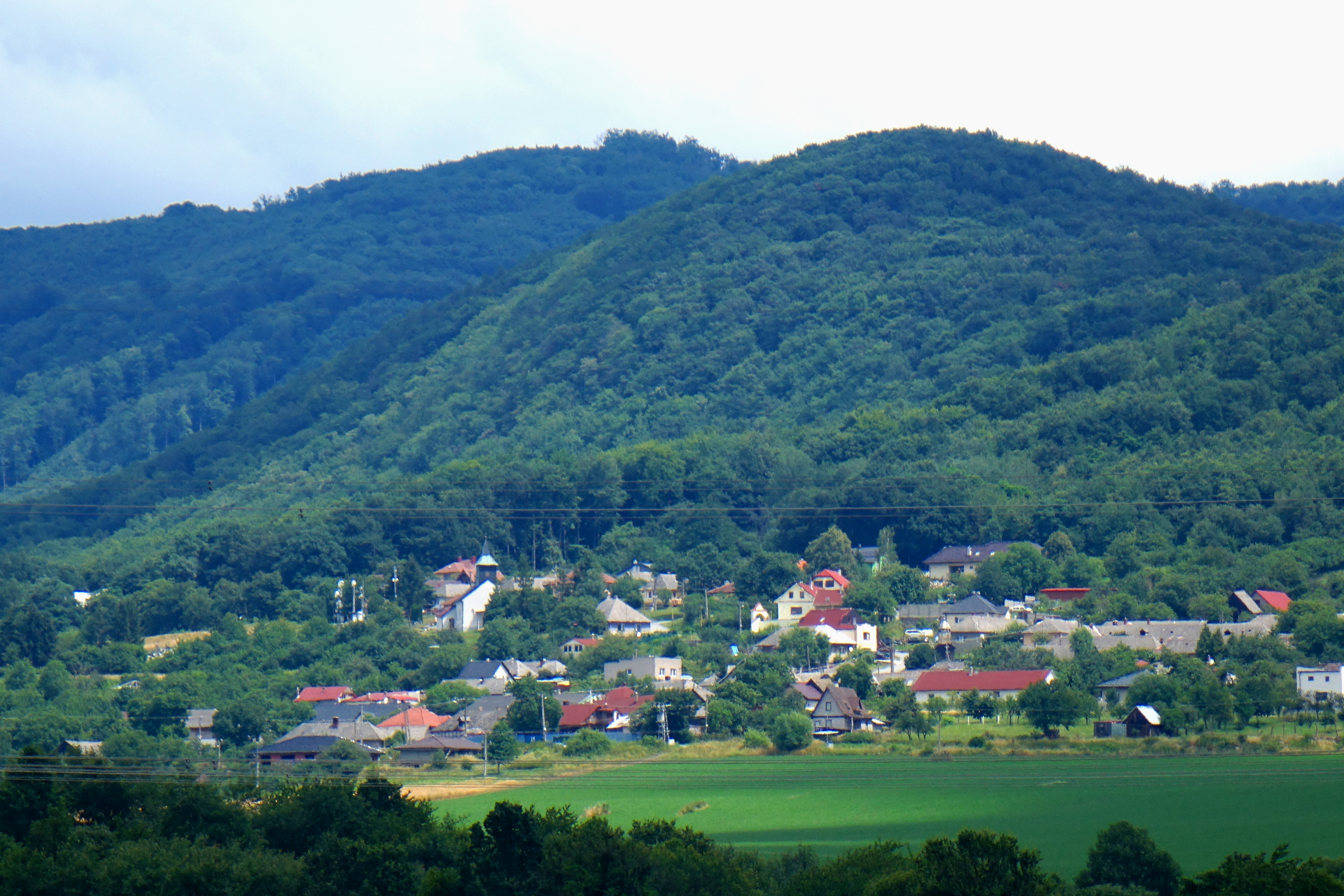

- Flag

- Location of Abranovce in the Prešov Region Location of Abranovce in Slovakia
- Coordinates: 48.93°N 21.35°E
- Country: Slovakia
- Region: Prešov Region
- District: Prešov District
- First mentioned: 1320

Area
  - Total: 9.58 km^{2} (3.70 sq mi)
- Elevation: 446 m (1,463 ft)

Population (2025)
  - Total: 741
- Time zone: UTC+1 (CET)
  - Summer (DST): UTC+2 (CEST)
- Postal code: 825 2
- Area code: +421 51
- Vehicle registration plate (until 2022): PO
- Website: www.abranovce.sk

Abranovce (Hungarian: Ábrány, Rusyn: Абрановце) is a village and municipality in Prešov District in the Prešov Region of eastern Slovakia. The municipality lies at an altitude of 492 metres and covers an area of 9.58 km^{2} (3.70 sq mi) (2025-06-30/-07-01).

== Geography ==
The municipality lies at an altitude of 446 metres (1,463 ft) and covers an area of 9.58 km^{2} (3.70 sq mi) (2025).

== Population ==
Population statistic (10 years)
| Year | 1995 | 2005 | 2015 | 2025 |
|---|---|---|---|---|
| Count | 515 | 572 | 655 | 741 |
| Difference | | +11.06% | +14.51% | +13.12% |

Population statistic
| Year | 2024 | 2025 |
|---|---|---|
| Count | 734 | 741 |
| Difference | | +0.95% |

It has a population of 741 people (31 December 2025).

=== Ethnicity ===
Census 2021 (1+ %)
| Ethnicity | Number | Fraction |
|---|---|---|
| Slovak | 637 | 92.31% |
| Romani | 99 | 14.34% |
| Not found out | 29 | 4.2% |
| Total | 690 | |

In year 2021 was 690 people by ethnicity 637 as Slovak, 99 as Romani, 29 as Not found out, 3 as Czech, 2 as Rusyn, 1 as Polish, 1 as Hungarian, 1 as Other and 1 as English.

Note on population: The difference values of population numbers in the table "Population statistic" and in the sections "Ethnicity" & "Religion" is caused by the use of various statistical methods.

=== Religion ===
Census 2021 (1+ %)
| Religion | Number | Fraction |
|---|---|---|
| Roman Catholic Church | 397 | 57.54% |
| Greek Catholic Church | 189 | 27.39% |
| None | 52 | 7.54% |
| Not found out | 21 | 3.04% |
| Evangelical Church | 16 | 2.32% |
| Total | 690 | |

In year 2021 was 690 people by religion 397 from Roman Catholic Church, 189 from Greek Catholic Church, 52 from None, 21 from Not found out, 16 from Evangelical Church, 6 from Christian Congregations in Slovakia, 5 from Other, 3 from Hinduism and 1 from Eastern Orthodox Church.

== Genealogical resources ==
The records for genealogical research are available at the state archive in Prešov (Slovak: Štátny archív v Prešove).

- Roman Catholic church records (births/marriages/deaths): 1814–1895
- Greek Catholic church records (births/marriages/deaths): 1762–1895
- Lutheran church records (births/marriages/deaths): 1768–1898
- Census records 1869 of Abranovce are available at the state archive.

== See also ==
- List of municipalities and towns in Slovakia
