= Pavel Peter Gojdič =

Rusyn Greek Catholic monk and eparch

Blessed Pavel Gojdič O.S.B.M.
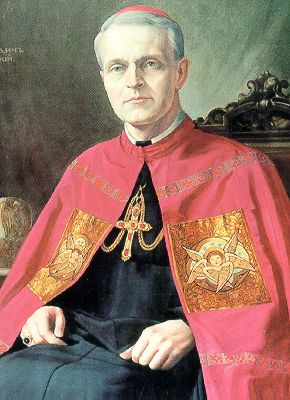
- Bishop Pavel Peter Gojdič
- Born: 17 July 1888; Ruské Pekľany, Austria-Hungary
- Died: 17 July 1960 (aged 72); Leopoldov, Czechoslovak Socialist Republic
- Venerated in: Latin Catholic Church; Ruthenian Greek Catholic Church; Hungarian Greek Catholic Church; Slovak Greek Catholic Church; Ukrainian Greek Catholic Church; Anglican Communion
- Beatified: 4 November 2001 by Pope John Paul II
- Major shrine: Cathedral of St. John the Baptist, Prešov, Slovakia
- Feast: 17 July

Pavel Peter Gojdič, OSBM (also Pavol; 17 July 1888 — 17 July 1960), was a Rusyn Basilian monk who served as Eparch of Prešov in the Slovak Greek Catholic Church. Following the 1948 Czechoslovak coup d'état, he was arrested by the StB, the secret police of the communist regime in Czechoslovakia, and imprisoned on charges of high treason. Despite promises of immediate release if he would agree to become patriarch of the Orthodox Church in Czechoslovakia, Gojdič died at Leopoldov Prison as a prisoner of conscience in 1960.

Following the 1989 Velvet Revolution, Gojdič was posthumously honoured by President Václav Havel and was beatified by Pope John Paul II in 2001. For his role in saving 1500 Jewish lives during the Holocaust in Slovakia, Gojdič was posthumously honoured as a Righteous Among the Nations by Yad Vashem in 2007.

== Early life ==
Gojdič was born on 17 July 1888 at Ruské Pekľany (today part of Ľubovec in Slovakia), the third child of the Byzantine Catholic priest Stefan Gojdič; his mother's name was Anna Gerberyova. He received the name of Peter in baptism.

Gojdič attended primary school at Cigelka, Bardejov and Prešov, finishing his primary studies at Prešov in 1907. He began his study of theology at Prešov and continued them a year later at the major seminary in Budapest. He and his brother Cornelius were ordained on 27 August 1911, after which Gojdič worked for a brief period as assistant parish priest with his father.

== Pastoral work ==
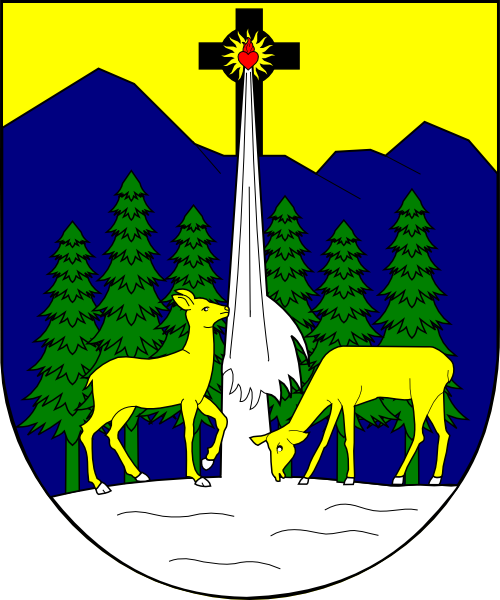
Coat of arms of Bishop Pavel Peter Gojdic, Eparch of Prešov

In the autumn of 1912, after a short period of pastoral work, he was appointed prefect of the Eparchial Boarding School for boys in Prešov, known as "The Alumneum." At the same time he became an instructor of religion in the city's higher secondary schools. He was also entrusted with the spiritual care of the faithful in Sabinov as assistant parish priest. Gojdič was appointed to the Bishop's Chancery Office, where eventually he achieved the rank of Chancellor. A career as a diocesan administrator did not attract him, so he decided to become a Basilian monk. On 20 July 1922 Gojdič entered St. Nicholas Monastery on Chernecha Hora, near Mukachevo, where taking the habit on 27 January 1923, he took the name Pavel.

Appointed Director of the Apostleship of Prayer, he became instrumental in spreading the practice of frequent confession and Holy Communion throughout the Eparchy of Mukachevo. He usually spent long hours, mostly at night, in the chapel before the tabernacle. In 1927 he was appointed titular Bishop of Harpasa and was consecrated on 25 March in the Roman Basilica of San Clemente by Bishop Dionisije Njaradi.

After his episcopal ordination he visited the Basilica of St. Peter in Rome, where he prayed on the tomb of the apostle. On 29 March 1927, together with Bishop Njaradi, he was received in a private audience by Pope Pius XI. The pope gave Gojdič a gold pectoral cross, saying: "This cross is only a symbol of all those heavy crosses that you will have to carry during your episcopal ministry."

Gojdič had been named apostolic administrator of the Eparchy of Prešov on 14 September 1926. His first official act in this office was to address a pastoral letter on the occasion of the 1100th anniversary of the birth of St. Cyril, apostle of the Slavs. Gojdič was proud of his Slavic heritage and was very fond of his oriental rite.

== Bishop ==
In 1940 the pope appointed him Bishop of Prešov, and for the year 1939 apostolic administrator of Mukacheve.

Even before World War II, he decided to defend both his fellow Rusyns and all speakers of other minority languages against coercive Slovakization. From the beginning of their persecution in Slovakia, Gojdič spoke up openly in defence of the Jewish population. On 25 January 1939, two days after the establishment of a special committee by the Slovak autonomist government charged with defining the "Program for the Solution of the Jewish Question," the bishop wrote a letter addressed to all parishes in his Prešov diocese; in the letter, he predicted disastrous results caused by these discriminatory policies. After the Slovak parliament confirmed a special law permitting the expulsion of Jews from Slovakia, Gojdič wrote a protest against the cruel deportations which were being carried out by the Collaborationist Hlinka Party. On 31 March 1942, Gojdič suggested to Vatican diplomat Giuseppe Burzio that Collaborationist Slovak President Fr. Jozef Tiso ought to be ordered to resign, and if he refused, be excommunicated and laicized over his complicity in the Holocaust in Slovakia.

During the war, the Bishop helped refugees and prisoners, and rescued inmates of concentration camps. On 26 October 1942, the Slovak Hlinka Guard informed the Ministry of the Interior that high number of fictitious conversions to Byzantine Catholicism were taking place. The report pointed out several cases where only one member of a Jewish family converted to Christianity in order to protect all the other members. Out of 249 Jewish families, 533 Jews had converted to the Greek Catholic or Russian Orthodox faith in order to rescue some 1500 other members of their families, who had not converted; moreover, most of those who had "converted" continued to actively practice Judaism either in the open or undercover. According to the security service report, Bishop Gojdič had personally held a fictitious conversion ceremony to save Jewish lives in the town of Michalovce.

After the end of hostilities, Slovak Jews whose lives had been saved by Bishop Gojdič foresaw that he would be in danger from the new Communist government and repeatedly offered, through the Bricha organization, to smuggle him to the West. However, Gojdič refused to leave his post as bishop. Foreseeing the 1948 Czechoslovak coup d'état well in advance, with the help of a new auxiliary, Bishop Basil Hopko, Gojdič launched a campaign to reinforce the faith of his people by mobilizing every possible means: visits, missions, retreats, the radio, and the press. Gojdič resisted any initiative to submit the Greek Catholics to Russian Orthodoxy, as demanded by the Communist Party, even though Gojdič knew he was risking persecution, arrest and maybe even death. Even though he was put under severe pressure to renounce both the Catholic faith and unity with the Pope, he refused every offer. Gradually he was isolated from the clergy and the faithful.

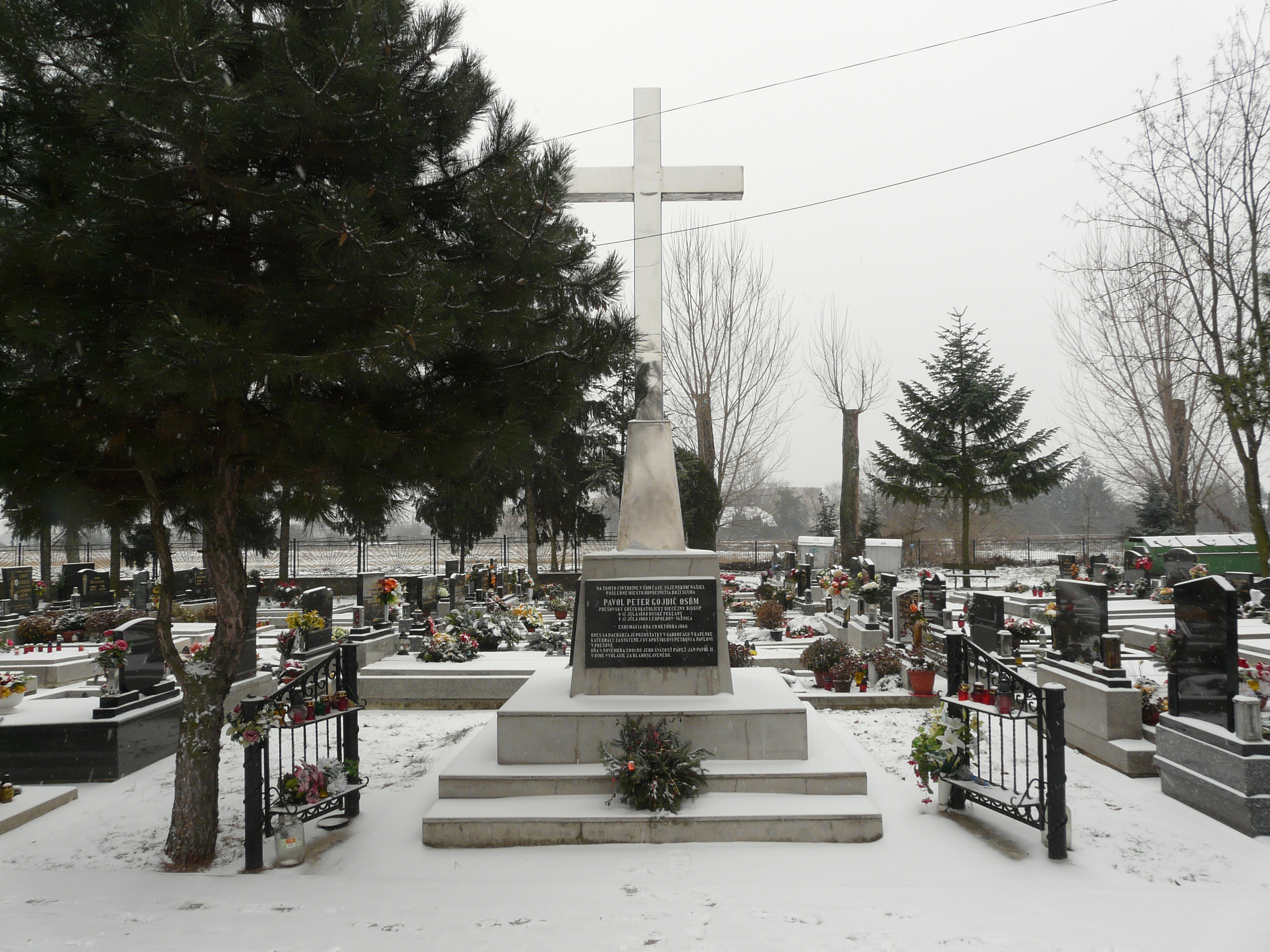
Memorial to Bishop Gojdič at the Leopoldov cemetery

On 28 April 1950, the Communist state outlawed the Greek Catholic Church and Gojdič was arrested and incarcerated by the StB. Slovak Jewish Holocaust survivors whose lives he had saved wrote a letter in his defense to the then-Prime Minister of Czechoslovakia Antonín Zápotocký, but to no avail. In January 1951, a trial "high treason" began against three Catholic bishops (Ján Vojtaššák, Michal Buzalka, and Gojdič) he was given a life sentence. Transferred from one prison to another, he remained faithful, praying and saying Divine Liturgy in secret, despite facing torture. Following an amnesty in 1953, given by Zapotocký, his life sentence was changed to 25 years detention. He was then 66 and his health continued to deteriorate, yet all further requests for amnesty were refused.

At the prison of Ruzyň an official informed him that from there he could go straight to Prešov, on the sole condition that he agree to become patriarch of the Orthodox Church in Czechoslovakia. He rejected the offer as an infidelity to the Pope and the faithful, and remained in prison.

Gojdič once said, "I am certain that at the end truth will triumph over lies, and love will overcome hatred. I do not hate my enemies. I would like to bring them closer to Christ, of course not by force or deceit but by love and truth."

Bishop Gojdič died of terminal cancer in the prison hospital of Leopoldov Prison in 1960, on his 72nd birthday. He was buried in an anonymous grave, n. 681, in the cemetery.

== Legacy and veneration ==
In 1968, his remains were moved to Prešov, and since 1990 have been kept in a sarcophagus in the Greek-Catholic Cathedral of St. John the Baptist.

Gojdič was legally rehabilitated on 27 September 1990. Subsequently, he was decorated posthumously by President Václav Havel with the Order of T. G. Masaryk – Second Class, and with the Cross of Pribina – First Class.

On 4 November 2001, Bishop Gojdič was beatified by Pope John Paul II, who during his visit in Slovakia, while visiting Prešov, prayed before his tomb in the chapel of the cathedral. Pope John Paul II said during his homily for the occasion, "Known to the people as 'the man with a heart of gold,' he became known to the representatives of the government of the time as a real 'thorn in the side.' After the Communist regime made the Greek Catholic Church illegal, he was arrested and imprisoned. Thus for him began a long calvary of suffering, mistreatment and humiliation which brought about his death on account of his fidelity to Christ and his love for the Church and the Pope."

He was honored in Bratislava by the Yad Vashem Holocaust Memorial in 2007 as one of the Righteous Among the Nations.

Preceded by Dionýz Nyaradi	Bishop of Prešov; 1940–1960	Succeeded by Vasil' Hopko
