= Slovak Catholic Metropolitan Archeparchy of Prešov =

Eastern Catholic archeparchy in Slovakia

Coordinates: 48.9941°N 21.2429°E

Archeparchy of Prešov Archieparchiensis Presoviensis Prešovská Archieparchia
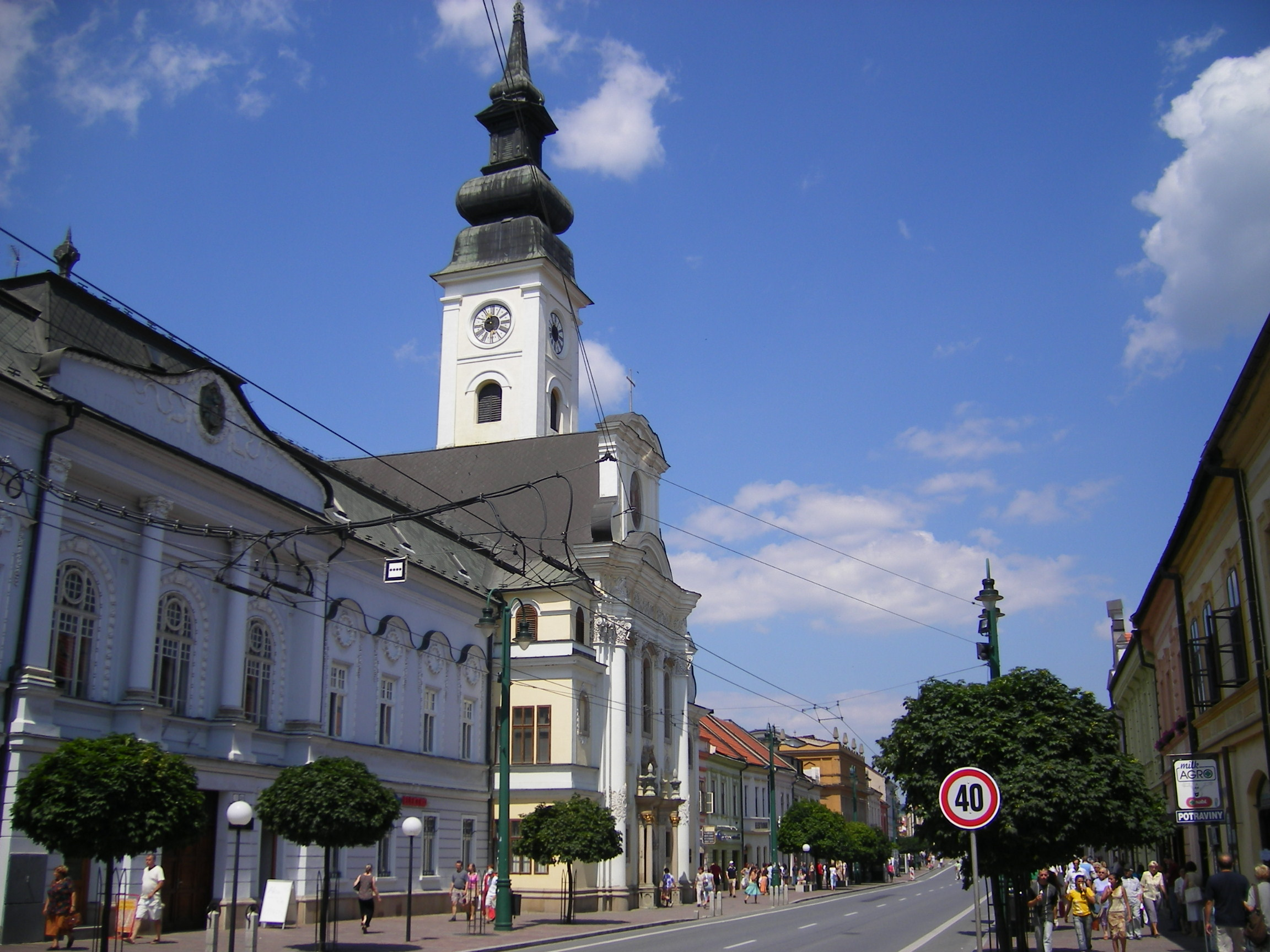
- Cathedral of St. John the Baptist, Prešov

- Coat of arms

Location
- Country: Slovakia
- Territory: Prešov Region
- Ecclesiastical province: Prešov

Statistics
- Population: (as of 2020); 117,915
- Parishes: 165

Information
- Denomination: Catholic Church
- Sui iuris church: Slovak Greek Catholic Church
- Rite: Byzantine Rite
- Established: 22 September 1818
- Cathedral: Cathedral of St. John the Baptist
- Secular priests: 249

Current leadership
- Pope: Leo XIV
- Metropolitan Archbishop: Jonáš Maxim
- Bishops emeritus: Ján Babjak

Map
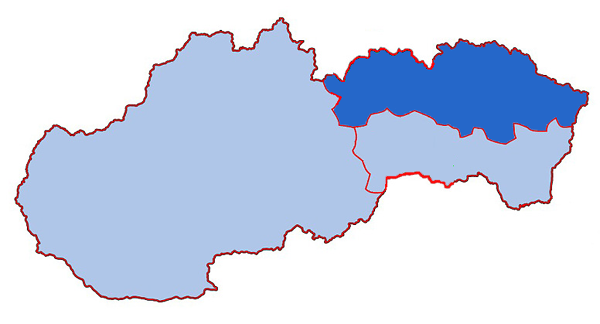

Website
- Official Website

The Archeparchy of Prešov (Latin: Archieparchiensis Presoviensis) is an archeparchy (equivalent to an archdiocese in the Latin Church) of the Slovak Greek Catholic Church which is an Eastern Catholic particular church of the Catholic Church that is in full communion with the Holy See. The archeparchy is the metropolitan see of the Slovak Greek Catholic ecclesiastical province which covers the whole of Slovakia. The archeparch (equivalent to an archbishop in the Latin Church) is also, ex officio, the metropolitan bishop of the metropolis. The geographical remit of the archeparchy itself is confined to the Prešov Region of Slovakia. The archeparch is currently Jonáš Maxim. The cathedral church of the archeparcy is the cathedral of St. John the Baptist which is situated in Prešov. As an Eastern Catholic church, it uses the Byzantine Rite in the Slovak and Church Slavonic languages.

== Structure ==
The metropolis is the sole metropolitan see of the Slovak Greek Catholic Church. The archeparchy has two suffragan eparchies: the Eparchy of Košice and the Eparchy of Bratislava. As of 2004 it had 136,593 Slovak Greek Catholic faithful under its jurisdiction. It has a minor basilica Farský chrám Nanebovzatia Presvätej Bohorodičky, bazilika minor, in Ľutina. Current archeparch is the Ján Babjak, S.J.

== History ==
Following the partitions of Poland, the Habsburg monarchy gained control of extensive lands in the region of Galicia. Together with Carpathian Ruthenia lands of the Kingdom of Hungary, they included large minorities who adhered to Eastern Catholicism. As a result, Empress Maria Theresa, with the approval of the Holy See, decided to establish ecclesiastical territories on Habsburg-controlled lands. On 27 June 1787, the "Vicariate of Košice" was established on territory that was formerly in the western part of the Greek Catholic Eparchy of Mukachevo. Later, the episcopal seat of the Vicariate was transferred from Košice to Prešov. On 22 September 1818, the vicarate was elevated to an eparchy.

As part of Dual Monarchy of Austria-Hungary, on 8 June 1912, the eparchy lost some territory to establish the Hungarian Greek Catholic Eparchy of Hajdúdorog (now the Hungarian Catholic Archeparchy of Hajdúdorog).

In July 1995, it enjoyed a papal visit by John Paul II. On 18 January 1996 the eparchy lost its Czech territory to establish the Apostolic Exarchate of the Greek Catholic Church in the Czech Republic. In Slovakia, the eparchy lost territory to establish the apostolic exarchate of Košice on 17 January 1997. The exarchate was later raised to an eparchy – the Slovak Catholic Eparchy of Košice. On 30 January 2008, it again lost territory in western and central Slovakia when the Eparchy of Bratislava was erected. At the same time it was elevated to a sui juris metropolitan archeparchy.

== Episcopal incumbents ==
Bishops of Prešov (Slovak Rite)

- Gregor Tarkovič (1818-09-26 – 1841-01-16)
- Jozef Gaganec (1843–1875)
- ThDr. Mikuláš Tóth (1876–1882)
- ThDr. Ján Vályi (1882–1911)
- ThDr. Štefan Novák (1913–1918)
- ThDr. Mikuláš Rusnák (1918–1922), Vicar General
- Dionisije Njaradi (1922–1927), Apostolic Administrator
- Pavel Peter Gojdič, OSBM (1927–1960)
  - auxiliary bishop ThDr. Vasiľ Hopko (1947–1976)
- Mons. Ján Hirka (1969–2002), until 1989 as Apostolic Administrator
  - auxiliary bishop Milan Chautur, C.Ss.R. (1992–1997)
- Bishop Ján Babjak, S.J. (2002-12-11 – 2008-01-30, cfr. infra: later first Metropolitan Archeparch)

Metropolitan Archeparchs of Prešov (Slovak Rite)

- Archbishop Ján Babjak, S.J. (2008-01-30 – 2022-04-22), as above: previously bishop of Prešov
  - auxiliary bishop Milan Lach, S.J. (2013–2017)
- Peter Rusnák (2022-04-22 – 2024-01-27), Apostolic Administrator
- Archbishop Jonáš Maxim (since 2023-10.26)
