= Hrabské =

- Municipality
- Flag

- Location of Hrabské in the Prešov Region Location of Hrabské in Slovakia
- Coordinates: 49.34°N 21.07°E
- Country: Slovakia
- Region: Prešov Region
- District: Bardejov District
- First mentioned: 1353

Area
  - Total: 10.90 km^{2} (4.21 sq mi)
- Elevation: 474 m (1,555 ft)

Population (2025)
  - Total: 666
- Time zone: UTC+1 (CET)
  - Summer (DST): UTC+2 (CEST)
- Postal code: 860 6
- Area code: +421 54
- Vehicle registration plate (until 2022): BJ
- Website: www.obechrabske.sk

Hrabské (Rusyn: Грабске, Hungarian: Geréb) is a village and municipality in Bardejov District in the Prešov Region of north-east Slovakia.

== History ==
In historical records the village was first mentioned in 1338.

== Geography ==
The municipality lies at an altitude of 474 metres (1,555 ft) and covers an area of 10.90 km^{2} (4.21 sq mi) (2025).

== Population ==
Population statistic (10 years)
| Year | 1995 | 2005 | 2015 | 2025 |
|---|---|---|---|---|
| Count | 533 | 549 | 614 | 666 |
| Difference | | +3.00% | +11.83% | +8.46% |

Population statistic
| Year | 2024 | 2025 |
|---|---|---|
| Count | 664 | 666 |
| Difference | | +0.30% |

It has a population of 666 people (31 December 2025).

=== Ethnicity ===
Census 2021 (1+ %)
| Ethnicity | Number | Fraction |
|---|---|---|
| Slovak | 567 | 88.31% |
| Romani | 97 | 15.1% |
| Rusyn | 92 | 14.33% |
| Not found out | 26 | 4.04% |
| Total | 642 | |

In year 2021 was 642 people by ethnicity 567 as Slovak, 97 as Romani, 92 as Rusyn, 26 as Not found out, 3 as Czech and 1 as Ukrainian.

Note on population: The difference values of population numbers in the table "Population statistic" and in the sections "Ethnicity" & "Religion" is caused by the use of various statistical methods.

=== Religion ===
Census 2021 (1+ %)
| Religion | Number | Fraction |
|---|---|---|
| Greek Catholic Church | 354 | 55.14% |
| None | 240 | 37.38% |
| Not found out | 24 | 3.74% |
| Roman Catholic Church | 21 | 3.27% |
| Total | 642 | |

In year 2021 was 642 people by religion 354 from Greek Catholic Church, 240 from None, 24 from Not found out, 21 from Roman Catholic Church, 2 from Evangelical Church and 1 from Eastern Orthodox Church.

== Genealogical resources ==
The records for genealogical research are available at the state archive "Statny Archiv in Presov, Slovakia"

- Roman Catholic church records (births/marriages/deaths): 1792-1899 (parish B)
- Greek Catholic church records (births/marriages/deaths): 1830-1898 (parish A)

== See also ==
- List of municipalities and towns in Slovakia
