= Cathedral of Saint John the Baptist, Prešov =

Greek Catholic cathedral in Prešov, Slovakia

Coordinates: 48°59′39″N 21°14′34″E

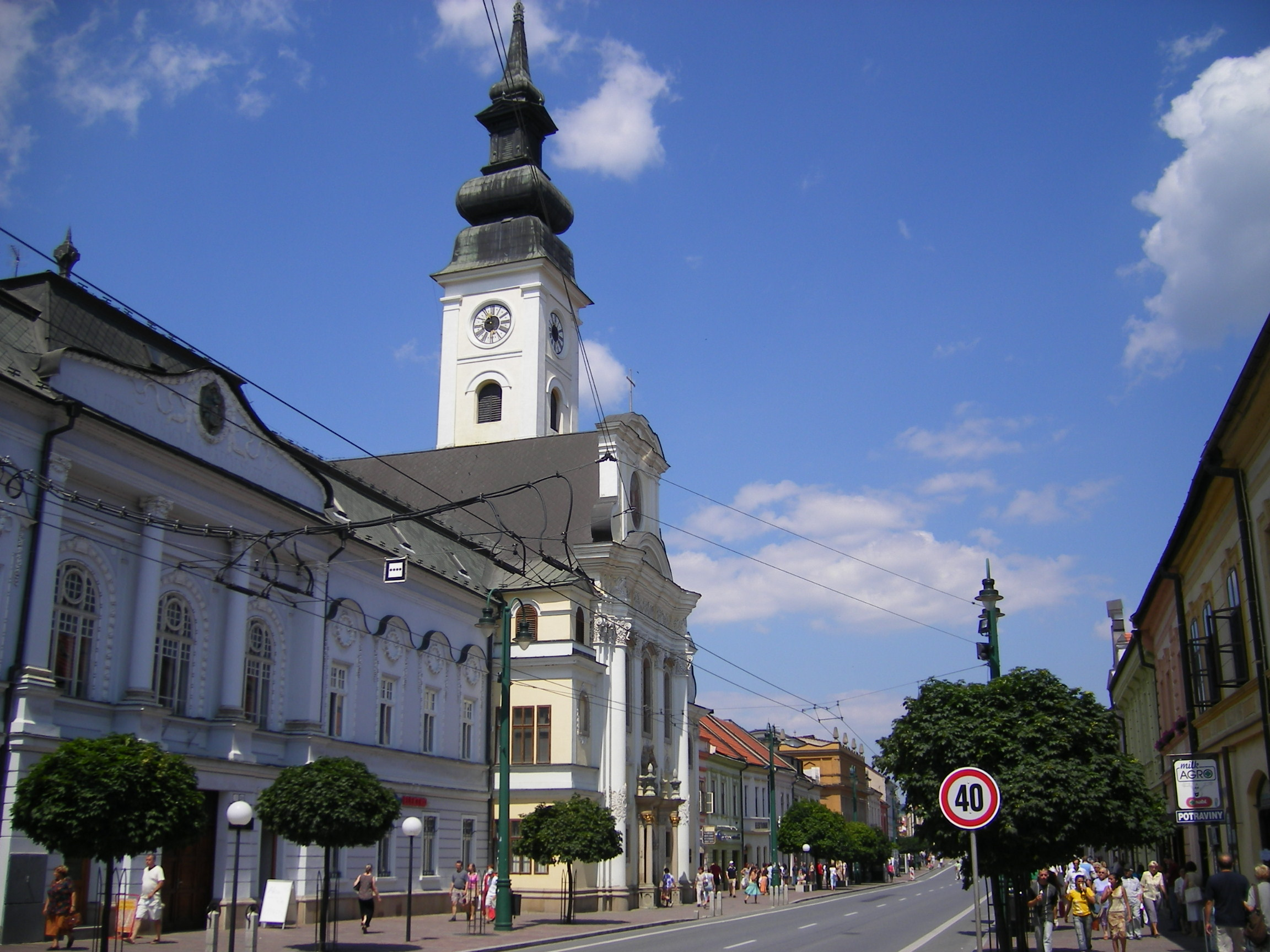

The Cathedral of Saint John the Baptist (Slovak: Katedrála svätého Jána Krstiteľa) in Prešov is a Greek Catholic cathedral, the seat of Archbishop of Prešov and the metropolitan church of Slovak Greek Catholic Province. Former eparchy bishops and martyrs Pavol Gojdič and Vasiľ Hopko are buried here. In the temple there also is a copy of Shroud of Turin.

A hospital chapel was built on the site by the Augustinians in the late 1300s; ownership of the site changed hands several times and it became a monastery in the late 1600s.

The building became a cathedral in 1818. It was transferred to the Greek Catholic Church in 1999.

== See also ==
- List of cathedrals in Slovakia
