= Peter Rusnák =

Slovak bishop

- Eparch Emeritus of Bratislava
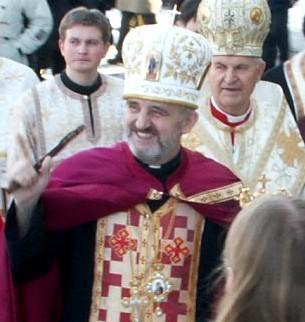
- Eparch Peter Rusnák after his episcopal ordination on 16 February 2008, the Preschauer sports hall
- Church: Slovak Greek Catholic Church
- Diocese: Eparchy of Bratislava
- In office: 30 January 2008 – 6 March 2026
- Predecessor: Eparchy erected
- Successor: Milan Lach
- Previous post: Apostolic Administrator of Prešov (2022-2024)

Orders
- Ordination: 16 June 1987 by Slavomir Miklovš
- Consecration: 16 February 2008 by Jozef Tomko

Personal details
- Born: 6 September 1950 (age 75) Humenné, Prešov Region, Czechoslovakia
- Coat of arms

Peter Rusnák (born 6 September 1950 in Humenné, Slovakia) is former eparch (bishop) of the Eparchy of Bratislava in the Slovak Greek Catholic Church.

== Life ==
Peter Rusnák, son of a Greek Catholic priest, was born in Humenné, a city in the eastern Slovakia. At the time of the communist regime in the former Czechoslovakia, the family was harassed by the state government. Peter Rusnák graduated in theology in the Roman Catholic University in Bratislava, at the same time it was the only Catholic School on the present territory of Slovakia during the Communist government in Czechoslovakia. Rusnák on 16 June 1987 in Greek Catholic Archeparchy of Prešov was ordained priest. As Apostolic Administrator Rusnák was in the following Greco-Catholic parishes pastoral operates in Kapišová, Prešov, Vranov nad Topľou, Petrová and Bardejov. From 1990 to 1993, Rusnák took spiritual care in the Greek Catholic seminary in Prešov to Greek Catholic seminarians.

From 1994 to 1995 he took over in the Prešov archeparchy the duties of the Roman Curia. From 1995 to 1998 Rusnák worked as director of the Curia. For 13 years, from 1990 to 2003, Peter Rusnák taught the subjects of pastoral theology and homiletics at the Greek-Catholic Faculty in Prešov. In addition Rusnák worked as a member of the Liturgical Commission. Pope Benedict XVI appointed Peter Rusnák on 30 January 2008 Eaprch of the Eparchy of Bratislava. The solemn ordination took place on 16 February 2008. On 6 March 2026, Pope Leo XIV accepted his resignation as Eparch of Bratislava.
