= Slovak Greek Catholic Church =

Eastern Catholic church

Coordinates: 48.9942°N 21.2432°E

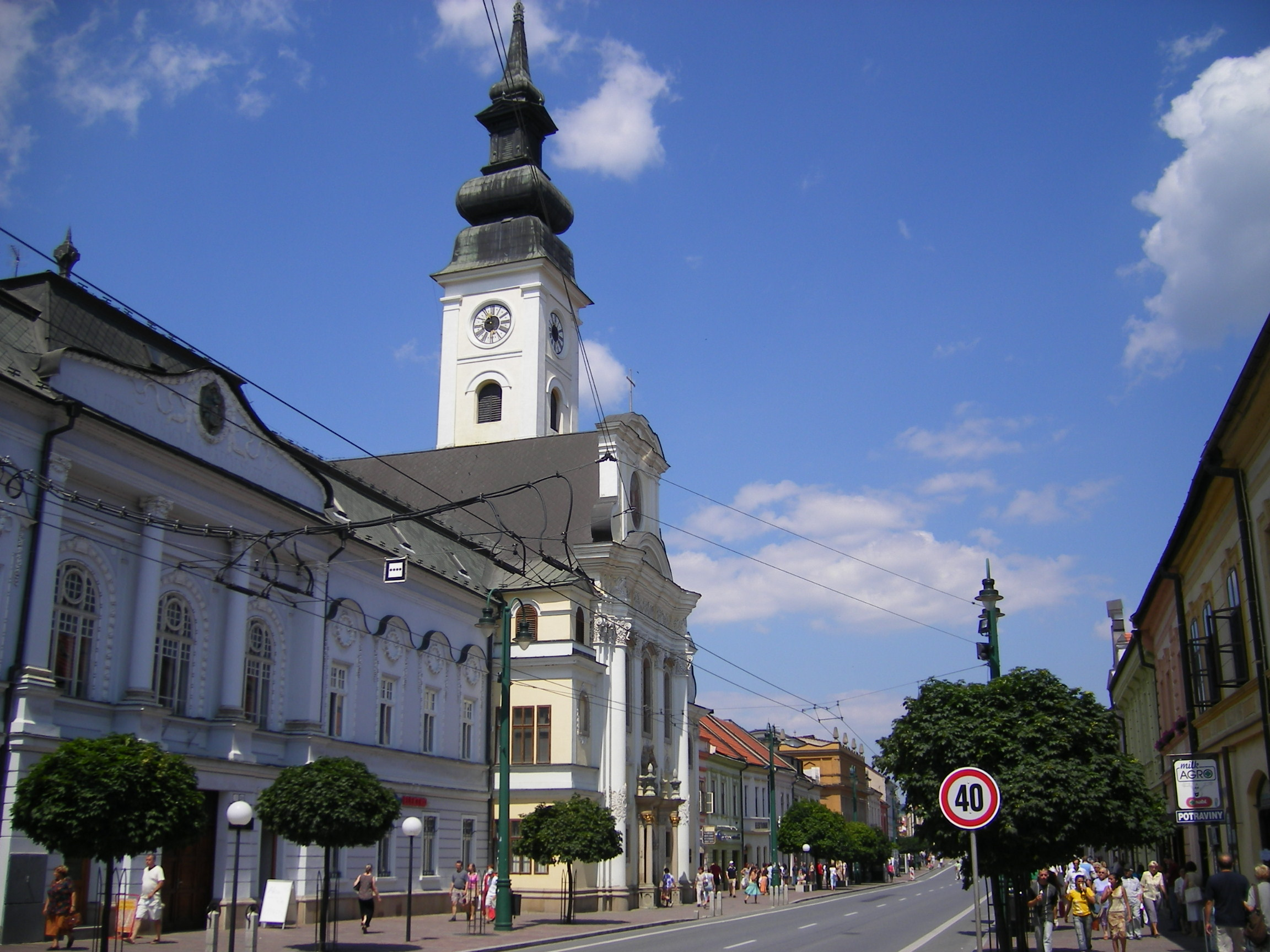
- Cathedral of St. John the Baptist in Prešov
- Type: Particular church (sui iuris)
- Classification: Christian
- Orientation: Eastern Catholic
- Theology: Catholic theology
- Polity: Episcopal
- Governance: Metropolitanate
- Pope: Leo XIV
- Primate: Jonáš Maxim
- Associations: Congregation for the Oriental Churches
- Region: Slovakia
- Liturgy: Byzantine Rite
- Headquarters: Prešov, Slovakia
- Branched from: Ruthenian Greek Catholic Church
- Members: 207,320
- Other name: Slovak Byzantine Catholic Church

The Slovak Greek Catholic Church (Note: Slovak: Gréckokatolícka cirkev na Slovensku; Latin: Ecclesia Graeco Catholica Slovacica) or Byzantine Catholic Church in Slovakia, is a sui iuris (autonomous) Eastern Catholic church based in Slovakia. As a particular church of the Catholic Church, it is in full communion with the Holy See. The church is organised as a single ecclesiastical province with one metropolitan see. Its liturgical rite is the Byzantine Rite. In 2008 in Slovakia alone, the Greek Catholic Church in Slovakia had some 350,000 lay members, 374 priests and 254 parishes. In 2017, the Catholic Church counted 207,320 Slovak Greek Catholics worldwide, representing roughly one percent of all Eastern Catholics.

== History ==
For a period of several centuries from the unanimous acceptance of the Union of Uzhhorod in the territory that includes present day eastern Slovakia in 1646, the history of the Slovak Greek Catholic Church was intertwined with that of the Ruthenian Greek Catholic Church. The eparchy of Prešov, created on September 22, 1818, was removed in 1937 from the jurisdiction of the Hungarian primate and subjected directly to the Holy See, while the 21 parishes of the eparchy of Prešov which were in Hungary were formed into the new exarchate of Miskolc.

At the end of World War I, most Greek Catholic Ruthenians and Slovaks were included within the territory of Czechoslovakia, including two eparchies, Prešov and Mukačevo. After the war, the eparchy of Mukačevo in Transcarpathia was annexed by the Soviet Union, thus the eparchy of Prešov included all the Greek Catholics who remained in Czechoslovakia. After communists seized the country in April 1950, a "synod" was convoked at Prešov, at which five priests and a number of laymen signed a document declaring that the union with Rome was disbanded and asking to be received into a jurisdiction of the Moscow Patriarchate in the Orthodox Church of Czechoslovakia. Greek Catholic bishop Blessed Pavel Petro Gojdič of Prešov along with his auxiliary, Blessed Basil Hopko, were imprisoned. Bishop Gojdič died in a prison hospital in 1960.

During the Prague Spring in 1968, the former Greek Catholic parishes were allowed to restore communion with Rome. Of the 292 parishes involved, 205 voted in favor. This was one of the few reforms undertaken by Alexander Dubček which survived the Soviet invasion the same year. However, most of their church buildings remained in the hands of Orthodox Church.

After communism was overthrown in the 1989 Velvet Revolution, church property was gradually returned to the Slovak Greek Catholic Church. This process was almost completed by 1993, the year after the separation of Czechoslovakia into the Czech Republic and Slovakia. For Greek Catholics in the Czech Republic, a separate Apostolic Vicariate was created, elevated in 1996 to an exarchate thus forming the Apostolic Exarchate in the Czech Republic (now considered part of Ruthenian Catholic Church); the 2007 Annuario Pontificio indicated that it had by then grown to having 177,704 lay people, 37 priests and 25 parishes.

In Slovakia itself, Pope John Paul II created an Apostolic Exarchate of Košice in 1997. Pope Benedict XVI raised this to the level of an Eparchy on January 30, 2008 and at the same time erected the new Byzantine-rite Eparchy of Bratislava. He also raised Prešov to the level of a metropolitan see, constituting the Slovak Greek Catholic Church as a sui iuris metropolitan church.

== Structure ==
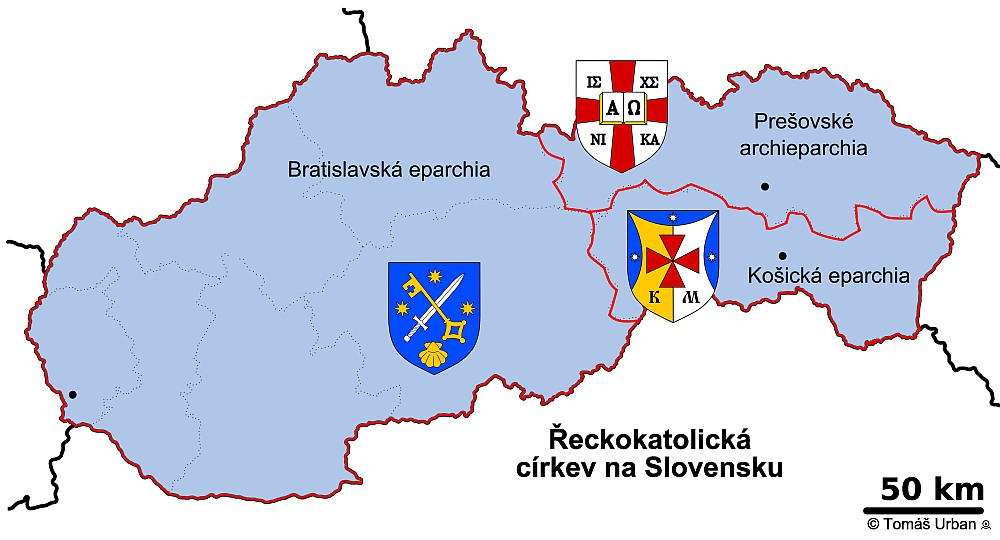
Eparchies in Slovakia

Slovakia:

- Archeparchy of Prešov with the following suffragans:
  - Eparchy of Bratislava
  - Eparchy of Košice

=== Current hierarchy of the church ===
The present Slovak Greek Catholic episcopate (7 hierarchs as of 13 March 2026) is as follows:

Metropolitan archbishop

- Jonáš Maxim, MSU, Metropolitan Archbishop of Prešov (since 2024)

Eparchial bishops

- Cyril Vasiľ, SJ, Archbishop-Bishop of Košice (since 2021)
- Milan Lach, SJ, Bishop of Bratislava (since 2026)

Apostolic visitor

- Marián Andrej Pacák, CSsR, Bishop, Apostolic Visitor in Western Europe (since 2026)

Emeritus hierarchs

- Ján Babjak, SJ, Metropolitan Emeritus of Prešov (since 2022)
- Milan Chautur, CSsR, Bishop Emeritus of Košice (since 2021)
- Peter Rusnák, Bishop Emeritus of Bratislava (since 2026)

== Abroad ==
In the United States and Canada, the Slovak Greek Catholics fall under the jurisdiction of the Ruthenian Greek Catholic Church, with the Exarchate of Saints Cyril and Methodius of Toronto for Slovak Greek Catholics reduced from an eparchy and transferred to Ruthenian authority in 2022.

== Sources ==
- Tóth, István György (2002). "Počiatky rekatolizácie na východnom Slovensku (The Beginning of re-Catholicization in Eastern Slovakia)". Historický časopis. 50 (4): 587–606.
