= Porúbka =

Porúbka may refer to several villages and municipalities in Slovakia:

- Porúbka, Bardejov District
- Porúbka, Humenné District
- Porúbka, Sobrance District
- Porúbka, Žilina District
