= Hierarchy of the Catholic Church =

The hierarchy of the Catholic Church consists of its bishops, priests, and deacons. In the ecclesiological sense of the term, hierarchy strictly means the "holy ordering" of the church, the Body of Christ, so to respect the diversity of gifts and ministries necessary for genuine unity.

In canonical and general usage, it refers to those who exercise authority within a Christian church. In the Catholic Church, authority rests chiefly with bishops, while priests and deacons serve as their assistants, co-workers or helpers. Accordingly, "hierarchy of the Catholic Church" is also used to refer to the bishops alone. The term "pope" was still used loosely until the sixth century, being at times assumed by other bishops. The term "hierarchy" became popular only in the sixth century, due to the writings of Pseudo-Dionysius.

As of 31 December 2020, the Catholic Church consisted of 2,903 dioceses or equivalent jurisdictions, each overseen by a bishop. Dioceses are divided into individual communities called parishes, each staffed by one or more priests, deacons, or lay ecclesial ministers. Ordinarily, care of a parish is entrusted to a priest, though there are exceptions. Approximately 19.3% of all parishes do not have a resident pastor, and 1,948 parishes worldwide are entrusted to a deacon or lay ecclesial minister.

All clergy, including deacons, priests, and bishops, may preach, teach, baptize, witness marriages, and conduct funeral liturgies. Only priests and bishops can celebrate the sacraments of the Eucharist (though others may be ministers of Holy Communion), Penance (Reconciliation, Confession), Confirmation (priests may administer this sacrament with prior ecclesiastical approval), and Anointing of the Sick. Only bishops can administer the sacrament of Holy Orders, by which men are ordained as bishops, priests or deacons.

== History ==
The existence of a Roman Catholic hierarchy (made of bishops, priests, and deacons) is attested since the time of the first Epistle of Ignatius to the Philadelphians.

== Episcopate ==
The bishops, who possess the fullness of orders, and therefore the fullness of both priesthood and diaconate, are as a body (the College of Bishops) considered the successors of the Apostles and are "constituted Pastors in the Church, to be the teachers of doctrine, the priests of sacred worship and the ministers of governance" and "represent the Church." In 2012, there were 5,133 Catholic bishops; at the end of 2021, there were 5,340 Catholic bishops. The Pope himself is a bishop (the bishop of Rome) and traditionally uses the title "Venerable Brother" when writing formally to another bishop.

The typical role of a bishop is to provide pastoral governance for a diocese. Bishops who fulfill this function are known as diocesan ordinaries, because they have what canon law calls ordinary (i.e. not delegated) authority for a diocese. These bishops may be known as hierarchs in the Eastern Catholic Churches. Other bishops may be appointed to assist ordinaries (auxiliary bishops and coadjutor bishops) or to carry out a function in a broader field of service to the church, such as appointments as papal nuncios or as officials in the Roman Curia.

Bishops of a country or region may form an episcopal conference and meet periodically to discuss current problems. Decisions in certain fields, notably liturgy, fall within the exclusive competence of these conferences. The decisions of the conferences are binding on the individual bishops only if agreed to by at least two-thirds of the membership and confirmed by the Holy See.

Bishops are normally ordained to the episcopate by at least three other bishops, though for validity only one is needed and a mandatum from the Holy See is required. Ordination to the episcopate is considered the completion of the sacrament of Holy Orders; even when a bishop retires from his active service, he remains a bishop, since the ontological effect of Holy Orders is permanent. On the other hand, titles such as archbishop or patriarch imply no ontological alteration, and existing bishops who rise to those offices do not require further ordination.

Sacramentally, all bishops are equal. According to jurisdiction, office, and privileges, however, various ranks are distinguished, as indicated below. All bishops are "vicars of Christ".

=== Pope (Bishop of Rome) ===
The pope is the bishop of Rome. He is also, by virtue of that office:

Vicar of Jesus Christ, Successor of the Prince of the Apostles, Supreme Pontiff of the Universal Church, Patriarch of the Latin Church, Primate of Italy, Archbishop and Metropolitan of the Roman Province, Sovereign of the Vatican City State, Servant of the servants of God.

==== Offices and titles ====
"Pope" is a pronominal honorific, not an office or a title, meaning "Father" (the common honorific for all clergy). The honorific "pope" was from the early 3rd century used for any bishop in the West, and is known in Greek as far back as Homer's Odyssey (6:57). In the East, "pope" is still a common form of address for clergy in the Bulgarian Orthodox Church and the Russian Orthodox Church, and is the style of the bishop of Alexandria. Pope Marcellinus (died 304) is the first Bishop of Rome shown in sources to have had the title "pope" used of him. From the 6th century, the imperial chancery of Constantinople normally reserved this designation for the Bishop of Rome. From the early 6th century, it began to be confined in the West to the Bishop of Rome, a practice that was firmly in place by the 11th century, when Pope Gregory VII declared it reserved for the Bishop of Rome.

As bishop of the Church of Rome, he is successor to the co-patrons of that local church, Saint Peter and Saint Paul. As such, the Church of Rome, and its bishop, has always had a prominence in the Catholic communion and at least to some degree primacy among his peers, the other bishops, as Peter had a certain primacy among his peers, the other apostles. The exact nature of that primacy is one of the most significant ecumenical issues of the age, and has developed as a doctrine throughout the entire history of the Catholic Church.

The Catechism of the Catholic Church, quoting the Second Vatican Council's document Lumen gentium, states: "The pope, Bishop of Rome and Peter's successor, 'is the perpetual and visible source and foundation of the unity both of the bishops and of the whole company of the faithful.'" Communion with the bishop of Rome has become such a significant identifier of Catholic identity that at times the Catholic Church has been known in its entirety as "Roman Catholic," though this is inaccurate in Catholic theology (ecclesiology).

Three other of the pope's offices stem directly from his office as bishop of the Church of Rome. As the Latin Church owes its identity and development to its origins in the liturgical, juridical, and theological patrimony of Rome, the bishop of Rome is de facto the patriarch of the Latin Church. According to Pope Benedict XVI, there has been much 'confusion' between the pope's primacy as patriarch of the western church and his primacy as first patriarch among equals, that this "failure to distinguish" between the roles and responsibilities of these two distinct positions leads in time to the "extreme centralization of the Catholic Church" and the schism between East and West.

As the first local Church of Italy, the bishop of Rome is the Primate of Italy and is empowered to appoint the president of the Italian Bishops' Conference.

The Church of Rome is also the principal church of the Province of Rome, so the bishop of Rome is Archbishop and Metropolitan of the Roman province.

As a bishop, the pope is referred to as a Vicar of Christ. This title was common to all bishops from the fourth through twelfth centuries, reserved to the bishop of Rome from the twelfth through early twentieth centuries, and restored to all bishops at the Second Vatican Council.

The pope resides in Vatican City, an independent state within the city of Rome, set up by the 1929 Lateran Pacts between the Holy See and Italy. As popes were sovereigns of the papal states (754–1870), so do they exercise absolute civil authority in the microstate of Vatican City since 1929.

Ambassadors are accredited not to the Vatican City State but to the Holy See, which was subject to international law even before the state was instituted. The body of officials that assist the Pope in governance of the church as a whole is known as the Roman curia. The term "Holy See" (i.e. of Rome) is generally used only of the Pope and the curia, because the Code of Canon Law, which concerns governance of the Latin Church as a whole and not internal affairs of the see (diocese) of Rome itself, necessarily uses the term in this technical sense.

Finally, the title "Servant of the servants of God" was an addition of Pope Gregory the Great, a reminder that in Christianity, leadership is always about service/ministry (diakonia).

The style of address for the bishop of Rome is "His Holiness".

==== Election ====
The present rules governing the election of a pope are found in the apostolic constitution Universi Dominici Gregis. This deals with the powers, from the death of a pope to the announcement of his successor's election, of the cardinals and the departments of the Roman curia; with the funeral arrangements for the dead pope; and with the place, time and manner of voting of the meeting of the cardinal electors, a meeting known as a conclave. This word is derived from Latin com- (together) and clavis (key) and refers to the locking away of the participants from outside influences, a measure that was introduced first as a means instead of forcing them to reach a decision.

Like all bishops, the pope has the option of resigning, though unlike other bishops, offering resignation is not required. The best known cases are those of Pope Celestine V in 1294, Pope Gregory XII in 1415 and Pope Benedict XVI in 2013. Approximately 10% of all popes left or were removed from office before death.

=== Eastern patriarchs ===
The heads of some autonomous (in Latin, sui iuris) particular churches consisting of several local churches (dioceses) have the title of Patriarch.

The pope, as patriarch of the Latin Church, is the head of the only sui iuris Church in the West, leading to the title Patriarch of the West. Eastern patriarchs are elected by the synod of bishops of their particular church.

The patriarchs who head autonomous particular churches are:

- The Coptic Catholic Patriarch of Alexandria (Coptic Catholic Church)
- The Melkite Greek Catholic Patriarch of Antioch (Melkite Greek Catholic Church)
- The Maronite Patriarch of Antioch (Maronite Church)
- The Syriac Catholic Patriarch of Antioch (Syriac Catholic Church)
- The Chaldean Catholic Patriarch of Babylonia (Chaldean Catholic Church)
- The Armenian Catholic Patriarch of Cilicia (Armenian Catholic Church)

These have authority not only over the bishops of their particular church, including metropolitans, but also directly over all the faithful. Eastern Catholic patriarchs have precedence over all other bishops, with the exceptions laid down by the Pope. The honorary title prefixed to their names is "His Beatitude".

Current and historical Catholic patriarchates
Type	Church	Patriarchate	Patriarch
Patriarchs of sui iuris Churches	Coptic	Alexandria	Patriarch Ibrahim Isaac Sidrak
Patriarchs of sui iuris Churches	Greek-Melkite	Antioch	Patriarch Youssef Absi
Patriarchs of sui iuris Churches	Maronite	Antioch	Cardinal Bechara Boutros al-Rahi
Patriarchs of sui iuris Churches	Syriac	Antioch	Patriarch Ignatius Joseph III Younan
Patriarchs of sui iuris Churches	Armenian	Cilicia	Patriarch Raphaël Bedros XXI Minassian
Patriarchs of sui iuris Churches	Chaldean	Baghdad	Patriarch Paul III Nona

=== Major archbishops ===
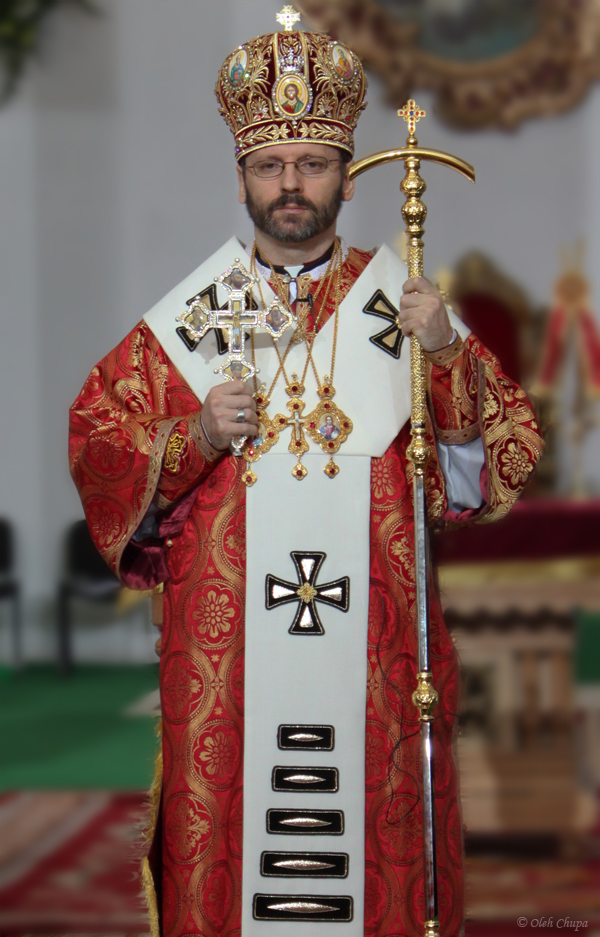
Sviatoslav Shevchuk, the Major Archbishop of Kyiv–Galicia since 2011

Other autonomous particular churches are headed by a major archbishop. The Syro-Malankara Catholic Church uses the title Catholicos for their major archbishop. With few exceptions, the authority of a major archbishop in his sui iuris church is equivalent to that of a patriarch in his church. This less prestigious office was established in 1963 for those Eastern Catholic Churches which have developed in size and stability to allow full self-governance if historical, ecumenical, or political conditions do not allow their elevation to a patriarchate.

At present, there are four major archbishops:

List of Catholic major archbishops
Major archdiocese	Country	Church	Year of Elevation as Major Archeparchy	Major Archbishop
Kyiv–Galicia	Ukraine	Ukrainian	1963	Major Archbishop Sviatoslav Shevchuk
Ernakulam-Angamaly	India	Syro-Malabar	1992	Major Archbishop Raphael Thattil
Trivandrum	India	Syro-Malankara	2005	Cardinal Catholicos Baselios Cleemis
Făgăraş and Alba Iulia	Romania	Romanian	2005	Major Archbishop Claudiu-Lucian Pop

=== Latin patriarchs ===
There are also titular patriarchs in the Latin Church, who, for various historical reasons, were granted the title, but never the corresponding office and responsibilities of "patriarch". They include the Latin Patriarch of Jerusalem, the Patriarch of Venice, the Patriarch of Lisbon, and the Patriarch of the East Indies. All of these offices are honorary, and the patriarchs are not the heads of autonomous particular churches. The Patriarch of the East Indies is the archbishop of Goa, while the other patriarchs are the archbishops of the named cities. The title of Patriarch of the West Indies was in the past granted to some Spanish bishops (not always of the same see), but is long in abeyance.

Current and historical Latin patriarchates
Type	Patriarchate	Patriarch
Patriarchs of the Latin Church	Jerusalem	Cardinal Pierbattista Pizzaballa
Patriarchs of the Latin Church	Lisbon	Patriarch Rui Valério
Patriarchs of the Latin Church	Venice	Patriarch Francesco Moraglia
Titular patriarchs of the Latin Church	East Indies	Cardinal Filipe Neri Ferrão
Titular patriarchs of the Latin Church	West Indies	vacant since 1963
Suppressed titles	Alexandria	suppressed in 1964
Suppressed titles	Antioch	suppressed in 1964
Suppressed titles	Constantinople	suppressed in 1964
Suppressed titles	Aquileia	suppressed in 1751
Suppressed titles	Grado	transferred to Venice in 1451

=== Cardinals ===
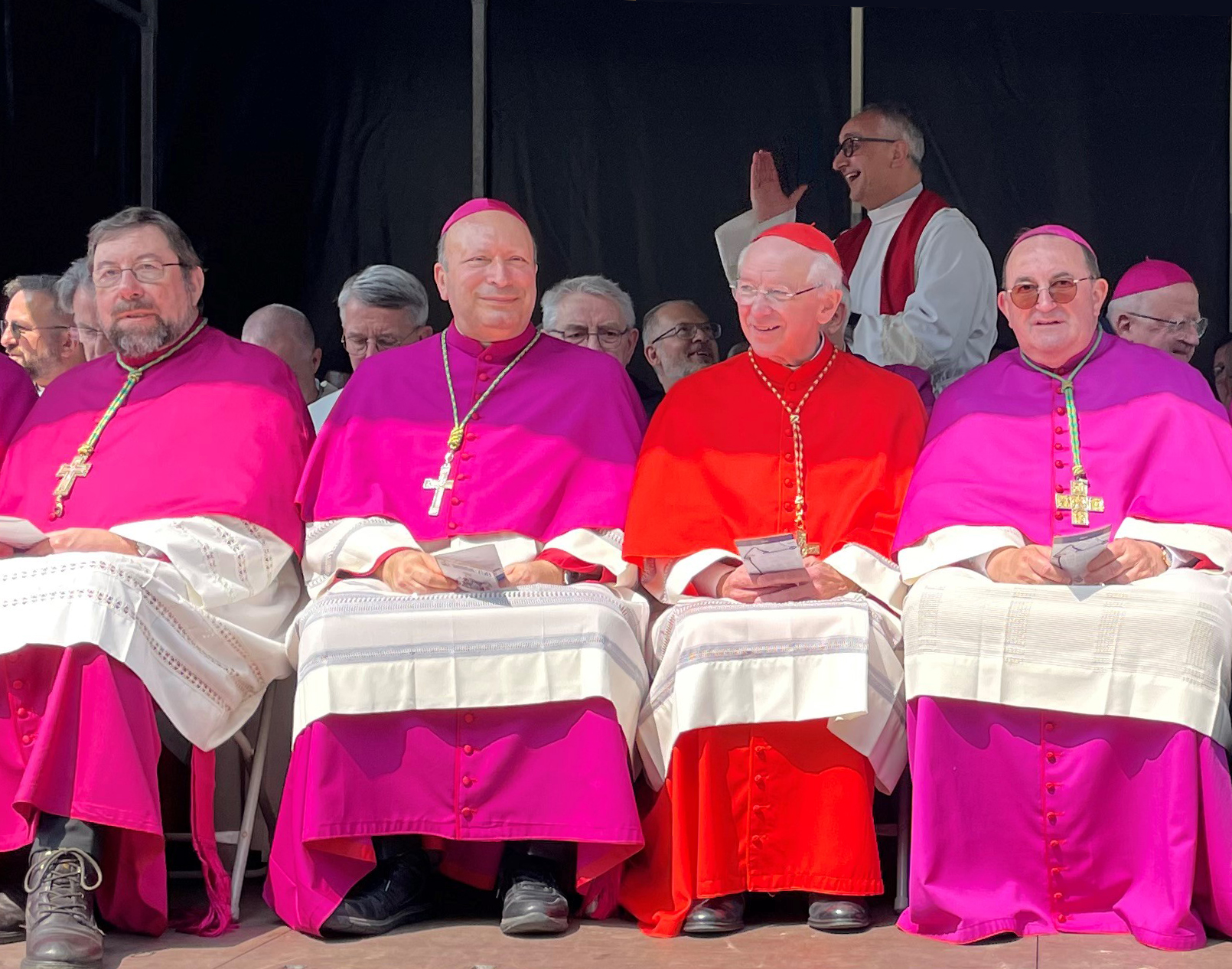
A cardinal (second from right) and bishops

Cardinals are princes of the church appointed by the Pope. He generally chooses bishops who head departments of the Roman Curia or important episcopal sees throughout the world. As a whole, the cardinals compose a College of Cardinals which advises the Pope, and those cardinals under the age of 80 at the death or resignation of a Pope elect his successor. Their heraldic achievement is surmounted by the red galero and tassels as a form of martyred position in the church.

Not all cardinals are bishops. Domenico Bartolucci, Karl Josef Becker, Albert Vanhoye, Roberto Tucci and Timothy Radcliffe are examples of 21st-century non-bishop cardinals. The 1917 Code of Canon Law introduced the requirement that a cardinal must be at least a priest. Previously, they needed only to be in minor orders and not even deacons. Teodolfo Mertel, who died in 1899, was the last non-priest cardinal. In 1962, Pope John XXIII made it a rule that a man who has been nominated a cardinal is required to be consecrated a bishop, if not one already, but some ask for and obtain dispensation from this requirement. It is rare that the Pope will appoint Cardinals who are priests only and not consecrated as a bishop.

The 1917 Code of Canon Law, continuing the tradition observed, for instance, at the First Vatican Council, laid down that cardinals have precedence over all other prelates, including non-cardinal patriarchs. The 1983 Code of Canon Law did not deal with questions of precedence.

The cardinalate is not an integral part of the theological structure of the Catholic Church, but largely an honorific distinction that has its origins in the 1059 assignation of the right of electing the Pope exclusively to the principal clergy of Rome and the bishops of the seven suburbicarian dioceses. Because of their resulting importance, the term cardinal (from Latin cardo, meaning "hinge") was applied to them. In the 12th century the practice of appointing ecclesiastics from outside Rome as cardinals began. Each cardinal is still assigned a church in Rome as his "titular church" or is linked with one of the suburbicarian dioceses. Of these sees, the Dean of the College of Cardinals holds that of Ostia, while keeping his preceding link with one of the other six sees. Traditionally, only six cardinals held the rank of Cardinal Bishop, but when Eastern patriarchs are made cardinals, they too hold the rank of Cardinal Bishop, without being assigned a suburbicarian see. The other cardinals have the rank either of Cardinal Priest or Cardinal Deacon, the former rank being normally assigned to bishops in charge of dioceses, and the latter to officials of the Curia and to priests raised to the cardinalate.

=== Primates ===
The Latin Church title of primate has in some countries been granted to the bishop of a particular (usually metropolitan) see. It once involved authority over all the other sees in the country or region, but now only gives a "prerogative of honor" with no power of governance unless an exception is made in certain matters by a privilege granted by the Holy See or by an approved custom. The title is usually assigned to the ordinary of the first diocese or the oldest archdiocese in the country. Thus in Poland, the primate is the archbishop of the oldest archdiocese (Gniezno, founded in 1000), and not the oldest diocese (Poznań, founded in 968).

Notably, the Archbishop of Baltimore is not formally considered a primate of the Catholic Church in the United States, but "prerogative of the place".

The closest equivalent position in Eastern Orthodoxy is an exarch holding authority over other bishops without being a patriarch. In the Eastern Catholic Churches, exarchs, whether apostolic or patriarchal, do not hold authority over other bishops (see below).

=== Metropolitan bishops ===
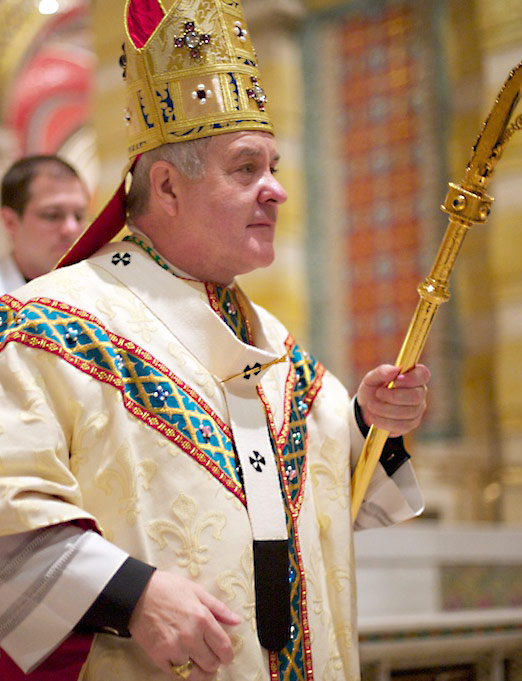
Archbishop Robert Carlson, Metropolitan Archbishop of St. Louis (2009–2020). He is wearing the pallium.

A Latin Church Metropolitan is the bishop of the principal (the "metropolitan") see of an ecclesiastical province composed of several dioceses. The metropolitan receives a pallium from the pope as a symbol of his office. The metropolitan bishop has oversight of his archdiocese and limited oversight authority over the suffragan dioceses in their province, including ensuring that the faith and ecclesiastical discipline are properly observed. He also has the power to name a diocesan administrator for a vacant suffragan see if the diocesan council of consultors fails to properly elect one. His diocesan tribunal additionally serves by default as the ecclesiastical court of appeal for suffragans (court of second instance), and the metropolitan has the option of judging those appeals personally.

The metropolitans of a given territory are also involved in the selection of bishops. Every three years, they compile a list of promovendis – a list of priests who may be suitable for the office of bishop. This is forwarded to the local apostolic nuncio, who evaluates the candidates in a consultative and confidential process. The nuncio in turn forwards the best candidates to the Dicastery for Bishops in Rome, who conduct a final evaluation of candidates and offer their findings to the pope for his final decision of appointment.

Eastern Metropolitans in patriarchal or major archiepiscopal churches have a level of authority similar to that of Latin metropolitans, subject to the specific laws and customs of their sui iuris church. Eastern metropolitans who head a metropolitan sui iuris church have much greater authority within their church, although it is less than that of a major archbishop or patriarch.

All metropolitans have the title of Archbishop, and the metropolitan see is usually referred to as an archdiocese or archeparchy, a title held not only by the 553 metropolitan sees but also by 77 other sees. An exception is the metropolitan Diocese of Rome.

=== Archbishops ===
The title of archbishop is held not only by bishops who head metropolitan sees, but also by those who head archdioceses that are not metropolitan sees (most of these are in Europe and the Levant). In addition, it is held by certain other bishops, referred to as "Titular Archbishops" (see "Other Bishops" below) who have been given no-longer-residential archdioceses as their titular sees—many of these in administrative or diplomatic posts, for instance as papal nuncios or secretaries of curial congregations. The bishop of a non-archiepiscopal see may be given the personal title of archbishop without also elevating his see (such a bishop is known as an archbishop ad personam), though this practice has seen significantly reduced usage since the Second Vatican Council.

=== Diocesan bishops ===
The bishop or eparch of a see, even if he does not also hold a title such as archbishop, metropolitan, major archbishop, patriarch or pope, is the centre of unity for his diocese or eparchy, and, as a member of the College of Bishops, shares in responsibility for governance of the whole church (cf. Catechism of the Catholic Church, 886).

Within the Catholic Church the following posts have similarities to that of a diocesan bishop, but are not necessarily held by a bishop.

==== Equivalents of diocesan bishops in law ====
Canon 368 of the 1983 Code of Canon Law lists five Latin Church jurisdictional areas that are considered equivalent to a diocese. These are headed by:

- A Territorial Prelate, formerly called a Prelate nullius dioceseos (of no diocese), in charge of a geographical area that has not yet been raised to the level of diocese
- A Territorial Abbot, in charge of an area, which in mission countries can be quite vast, associated with an abbey
- A Vicar Apostolic (normally a bishop of a titular see), in charge of an apostolic vicariate, usually in a mission country, not yet ready to be made a diocese
- A Prefect Apostolic (usually not a bishop), in charge of an apostolic prefecture, not yet ready to be made an apostolic vicariate
- A Permanent Apostolic Administrator, in charge of a geographical area that for serious reasons cannot be made a diocese.

To these may be added:

- An Apostolic Exarch (normally a bishop of a titular see), in charge of an apostolic exarchate—not yet ready to be made an eparchy—for the faithful of an Eastern Catholic Church in an area that is situated outside the home territory of that Eastern Church.
- A Patriarchal Exarch, a bishop in charge of a patriarchal exarchate—not yet ready to be made an eparchy—for the faithful of an Eastern Catholic Church in an area situated within the home territory of that patriarchal Eastern Church.
- A Military Ordinary, serving Catholics in a country's armed forces
- A Personal Prelate, in charge of a group of persons without regard to geography: the only personal prelature existing is that of Opus Dei.
- An apostolic administrator of a personal apostolic administration: only one exists, the Personal Apostolic Administration of Saint John Mary Vianney
- An ordinary of a personal ordinariate for former Anglicans
- A superior of an autonomous mission

Of somewhat similar standing is the diocesan administrator (formerly called a vicar capitular) elected to govern a diocese during a vacancy. Apart from certain limitations of nature and law, he has, on a caretaker basis, the same obligations and powers as a diocesan bishop (canons 427–429 of the 1983 Code of Canon Law). Occasionally an apostolic administrator is appointed by the Holy See to run a vacant diocese, or even a diocese whose bishop is incapacitated or otherwise impeded.

=== Other bishops ===
A diocesan bishop may have bishops who assist in his ministry. The coadjutor bishop of a see has the right of succession on the death or resignation of the diocesan bishop, and, if the see is an archdiocese, holds the title of archbishop. Similarly, a retired diocesan bishop keeps his connection with the see to which he was appointed, and is known as bishop (or archbishop) emeritus of that see. On the other hand, an auxiliary bishop, who may also hold posts such as vicar general or episcopal vicar, is appointed bishop of a titular see, a see that in the course of history has ceased to exist as an actual jurisdictional unit.

Important titles or functions usually, but not necessarily, held by (arch)bishops who are not in charge of a diocese or an equivalent community include those of Apostolic Delegate, Apostolic Nuncio, Papal Legate, Patriarchal Vicar, Pontifical Delegate.

== Ordinaries and local ordinaries ==
Local ordinaries are placed over or exercise ordinary executive power in particular churches or equivalent communities.

- The Supreme Pontiff (the Pope) is a local ordinary for the whole Catholic Church.
- In Eastern Catholic Churches, Patriarchs, major archbishops, and metropolitans have ordinary power of governance for the whole territory of their respective autonomous particular churches.
- Diocesan bishops and eparchial eparchs
- Other prelates who head, even if only temporarily, a particular church or a community equivalent to it (see above)
- Vicars general and protosyncelli

- Episcopal vicars and syncelli

Major superiors of religious institutes (including abbots) and of societies of apostolic life are ordinaries of their respective memberships, but not local ordinaries.

== Presbyterate ==
=== In general ===
Bishops are assisted by priests and deacons. All priests and deacons are incardinated in a diocese or religious order. Parishes, whether territorial or person-based, within a diocese are normally in the charge of a priest, known as the parish priest or the pastor.

In the Latin Church, only celibate men, as a rule, are ordained as priests, while the Eastern Churches, again as a rule, ordain both celibate and married men. Among the Eastern particular Churches, the Ethiopic Catholic Church ordains only celibate clergy, while also having married priests who were ordained in the Orthodox Church, while other Eastern Catholic Churches, which do ordain married men, do not have married priests in certain countries. The Western or Latin Church does sometimes, though rarely, ordain married men, usually Protestant clergy who have become Catholics. A married man aged 35 and above may be ordained as a deacon, with his wife's permission. All sui iuris churches of the Catholic Church maintain the ancient tradition that, following ordination, marriage is not allowed. Even a married priest or deacon whose wife dies may not then marry again.

The Catholic Church and the ancient Christian Churches see priestly ordination as a sacrament dedicating the ordinand to a permanent relationship of service, and, like Baptism and Confirmation, having an ontological effect on him. It is for this reason that a person may be ordained to each of the three orders only once. They also consider that ordination can be conferred only on males.

=== Priests in service outside their diocese ===
Although priests are incardinated into a diocese or order, they may obtain the permission of their diocesan ordinary or religious superior to serve outside the normal jurisdiction of the diocese or order. These assignments may be temporary or more permanent in nature.

Temporary assignments may include studying for an advanced degree at a Pontifical University in Rome. They may also include short-term assignments to the faculty of a seminary located outside the diocese's territory.

Long-term assignments include serving the universal church on the staff of a dicastery or tribunal of the Roman Curia or in the diplomatic corps of the Holy See. They may also be appointed the rector or to long-term teaching assignments to the faculty of a seminary or Catholic university. Priests may also serve on the staff of their episcopal conference, as military chaplains in the military ordinariates, or as missionaries.

=== Positions within a diocese at diocesan level ===
The diocesan bishop appoints a vicar general to assist him in the governance of the diocese. Usually, only one vicar general is appointed; particularly large dioceses may have more than one vicar general. The vicar general or one of them is usually appointed moderator of the curia who coordinates the diocesan administrative offices and ministries. A diocesan bishop can also appoint one or more episcopal vicars for the diocese. They have the same ordinary power as a vicar general, however, it is limited to a specified division of the diocese, to a specific type of activity, to the faithful of a particular rite, or to certain groups of people. Vicars general and episcopal vicars must be priests or bishops. In the Eastern Catholic Churches, they are called protosyncelli and syncelli (canon 191 of the Code of Canons of the Eastern Churches).

Diocesan bishops are required to appoint a judicial vicar to whom is delegated the bishop's ordinary power to judge cases (canon 1420 of the 1983 Code of Canon Law, canon 191 of the Code of Canons of the Eastern Churches). In the Latin Church, the judicial vicar may also be called officialis. The person holding this post must be a priest, have earned a doctorate in canon law (or at least a license), be at least thirty years old, and, unless the smallness of the diocese or the limited number of cases suggests otherwise, must not be the vicar general. As one of the jobs of the judicial vicar is to preside over collegiate tribunals, many dioceses have adjutant judicial vicars who can preside over collegiate tribunals in place of the judicial vicar and must have the same qualifications.

The diocesan bishop appoints a chancellor, possibly a vice-chancellor, and notaries to the diocesan chancery. These officials maintain the records and archives of the diocese. They also serve as the secretaries of the diocesan curia. The bishop also appoints a finance officer and a finance council to oversee the budget, temporal goods, income, and expenses of the diocese.

The diocesan bishop may appoint priests to be members of the chapter of his cathedral or of a collegiate church (so called after their chapter). These priests are given the title of canon. He also appoints six to twelve priests from the presbyteral council to serve as a college of consultors. They have the responsibility to elect the diocesan administrator in the event of the vacancy of the see.

The bishop appoints priests and other members of the faithful to various advisory bodies. These include the presbyteral council, the diocesan synod, and the pastoral council.

=== Vicars forane or deans ===
"The Vicar Forane known also as the Dean or the Archpriest or by some other title, is the priest who is placed in charge of a vicariate forane" (canon 553 of the 1983 Code of Canon Law), namely of a group of parishes within a diocese. Unlike a regional Episcopal vicar, a vicar forane acts as a help for the parish priests and other priests in the vicariate forane, rather than as an intermediate authority between them and the diocesan bishop.

=== Parish priest/pastor ===
This section concerns the priest who in the 1983 Code of Canon Law is referred to by the term parochus, which in some English-speaking countries is rendered as "the parish priest", in others as "the pastor". The English term "pastor" is also used in a more generic sense corresponding instead to the Latin term pastor:

The parish priest is the proper pastor of the parish entrusted to him. He exercises the pastoral care of the community entrusted to him under the authority of the diocesan Bishop, whose ministry of Christ he is called to share, so that for this community he may carry out the offices of teaching, sanctifying and ruling with the cooperation of other priests or deacons and with the assistance of lay members of Christ's faithful, in accordance with the law

—canon 519 of the 1983 Code of Canon Law in the English translation by the Canon Law Society of Great Britain and Ireland, assisted by the Canon Law Society of Australia and New Zealand and the Canadian Canon Law Society

The pastor (parochus) is the proper pastor (pastor) of the parish entrusted to him, exercising the pastoral care of the community committed to him under the authority of the diocesan bishop in whose ministry of Christ he has been called to share, so that for that same community he carries out the functions of teaching, sanctifying, and governing, also with the cooperation of other presbyters or deacons and with the assistance of lay members of the Christian faithful, according to the norm of law

—canon 519 of the 1983 Code of Canon Law in the English translation by the Canon Law Society of America).

=== Assistant priests/parochial vicars ===
The parish priest/pastor may be assisted by one or more other priests:

Whenever it is necessary or opportune for the due pastoral care of the parish, one or more assistant priests can be joined with the parish priest. As cooperators with the parish priest and sharers in his concern, they are, by common counsel and effort with the parish priest and under his authority, to labour in the pastoral ministry

—canon 545 of the 1983 Code of Canon Law in the English translation by the Canon Law Society of Great Britain and Ireland, assisted by the Canon Law Society of Australia and New Zealand and the Canadian Canon Law Society

Whenever it is necessary or opportune in order to carry out the pastoral care of a parish fittingly, one or more parochial vicars can be associated with the pastor. As co-workers with the pastor and sharers in his solicitude, they are to offer service in the pastoral ministry by common counsel and effort with the pastor and under his authority

—canon 545 of the 1983 Code of Canon Law in the English translation by the Canon Law Society of America

=== Honorary titles ===
The honorary title of monsignor is conferred by the Pope upon diocesan priests (not members of religious institutes) in the service of the Holy See, and may be granted by him also to other diocesan priests at the request of the priest's bishop. The priest so honored is considered to be a member of the papal household. The title goes with any of the following three awards:

- Chaplain of His Holiness (called Papal Chamberlain until a 1969 reform), the lowest level, distinguished by purple buttons and trim on the black cassock, with a purple sash.
- Honorary Prelate (until 1969 called Domestic Prelate), the middle level, distinguished by red buttons and trim on the black cassock, with a purple sash, and by choir dress that includes a purple cassock.
- Protonotary Apostolic, the highest level, with the same dress as that of an Honorary Prelate, except that the non-obligatory purple silk cape known as a ferraiolo may also be worn.

In December 2013, Pope Francis decided to make future grants of the title of Monsignor to priests not in the service of the Holy See only in the rank of Chaplain of His Holiness and only to priests aged 65 or over.

Under legislation of Pope Pius X, vicars general and vicars capitular (the latter are now called diocesan administrators) are titular (not actual) Protonotaries durante munere, i.e., as long as they hold those offices, and so are entitled to be addressed as Monsignor, as indicated also by the placing of the abbreviated title "Mons", before the name of every member of the secular (diocesan) clergy listed as a vicar general in the Annuario Pontificio. (Honorary titles such as that of "Monsignor" are not considered appropriate for religious.)

Some of the Eastern Catholic Churches of Syriac tradition use the title Chorbishop, roughly equivalent to the Western title of Monsignor. Other Eastern Catholic Churches bestow the honorific title of Archimandrite upon unmarried priests as a mark of respect or gratitude for their services. Married presbyters may be honored with the position of Archpriest, which has two grades, the higher is "Mitred Archpriest" which permits the priest to wear a mitre.

In the Latin Church, the title of Archpriest is sometimes attached to the pastors of historic churches, including the major basilicas in Rome. These archpriests are not presbyters, but bishops or cardinals. Similarly, the title of Archdeacon is sometimes conferred on presbyters.

== Diaconate ==
Deacons are ordained ministers of the church who are co-workers with the bishop alongside presbyters, but are intended to focus on the ministries of direct service and outreach to the poor and needy, rather than pastoral leadership. They are usually related to a parish, where they have a liturgical function as the ordinary minister of the Gospel and the Prayers of the Faithful. They may preach homilies, and in the Roman Rite may preside at non-Eucharistic liturgies such as baptisms, weddings, funerals, and adoration/benediction. In the Eastern Catholic Churches, in the absence of a priest, deacons do not vest and may only lead services as a reader, never presiding at weddings or funerals.

The scriptural basis and description of the role and qualifications of the deacon can be found in Acts 6:1–9, and in 1 Timothy 3:1–13.

They may be seminarians preparing for ordination to the priesthood, "transitional deacons", or "permanent deacons" who do not intend to be ordained as priests. To be ordained deacons, the latter must be at least 25 years old, if unmarried; if married, a prospective deacon must be at least 35 years old and have the consent of his wife. In the Latin Church, married deacons are permanent deacons. In most dioceses there is a cut-off age for being accepted into formation for the diaconate.

The passage from membership of the laity to that of the clergy occurs with ordination to the diaconate. Previously, the Latin Church rule was that one became a cleric on receiving clerical tonsure, which was followed by minor orders and by the subdiaconate, which was reckoned as one of the major orders. By his motu proprio Ministeria quaedam of 15 August 1972, Pope Paul VI decreed: "The orders hitherto called minor are henceforth to be spoken of as 'ministries'." The same motu proprio also decreed that the Latin Church would no longer have the major order of subdiaconate, but it permitted any episcopal conference that so desired to apply the term "subdeacon" to those who hold the ministry (formerly called the minor order) of "acolyte". Even in those societies within the Latin Church that, with the approval of the Holy See, continue to administer the rites of tonsure, minor orders and subdiaconate, those who receive those rites remain lay people, becoming clerics only on being ordained as deacons.

== Laity ==
Most Catholics are laity, a term derived from Greek λαὸς Θεοῦ (Laòs Theoû), meaning "people of God". Canon law specifies that all Christian faithful have the right and duty to bring the gospel message increasingly to "all people in every age and every land". They all have a share in the church's mission and have the right to undertake apostolic activity according to their own state and condition.

Lay ministry can take the form of exercising the priesthood of all the baptized, and more specifically undertaking the work of catechists, serving the church pastorally, administratively, and in other ways, including the liturgical services as acolytes, lectors, cantors, and the like, initiation sponsors, pastoral care ministers, and members of parish and diocesan consultative bodies.

The Second Vatican Council acknowledged the apostolic role of lay Catholics acting both as individuals and in collective associations, emphasising that associations linked with the apostolate of the church, often but not always known as "Catholic Action", should always co-operate with the [ordained] hierarchy and remain subject to hierarchical direction. Conversely, the Council expected that the hierarchy would "promote the apostolate of the laity".

Some lay Catholics carry out full-time professional and vocational service in the name of the church, rather than in a secular calling. Although the phenomenon is widespread in North America and much of Europe, the organization and definition of the ministry is left to national bishops' conferences. The United States Conference of Catholic Bishops has adopted the term lay ecclesial ministry for these individuals, as intentionally distinct from the general apostolate or ministry of the laity described above.

The consultative leadership of the church, in both the diocese and the parish, usually comprises a Pastoral Council and a Finance Council, as well as several Commissions usually focusing on major aspects of the church's life and mission, such as Faith Formation or Christian Education, Liturgy, Social Justice, Ecumenism, or Stewardship.

== Religious ==
Religious, who can be either lay people or clergy, are members of religious institutes, i.e. societies whose members take public vows and live a fraternal life in common. This is a form of consecrated life distinct from other forms, such as that of secular institutes. Religious life is also distinct from forms that do not involve membership of an institute, such as that of consecrated hermits, that of consecrated virgins, and other forms whose approval is reserved to the Holy See.

Lumen gentium affirms that profession of the evangelical counsels by religious does not of itself constitute a role with the hierarchical structure of the Church, but the religious state "nevertheless, undeniably belongs to its life and holiness".

Religious institutes have historically been subdivided into the categories of orders and congregations. Male members of orders or congregations are brothers, monks, or friars, while female members are nuns or religious sisters. Each order may have its own hierarchy of offices such superior general, abbot or abbess, mother superior, prior or prioress, or others, and the specific duties and responsibilities for each office will depend on the specific order or congregation. Those who are in the process of joining a religious institute but have not yet taken their perpetual vows may be referred to as postulants or novices.

== See also ==
- Anglican ministry
- Apostolic Syndic
- Catholic Church by country
- Global organisation of the Catholic Church
- List of Eastern Catholic exarchates
- List of Roman Catholic apostolic administrations
- List of Roman Catholic apostolic prefectures
- List of Roman Catholic apostolic vicariates
- List of Roman Catholic archdioceses
- List of Roman Catholic dioceses (alphabetical)
- List of Roman Catholic dioceses (structured view)
- List of Roman Catholic military dioceses
- List of Roman Catholic missions sui juris
- List of Roman Catholic territorial prelatures
- Lists of patriarchs, archbishops, and bishops
- Order of precedence in the Catholic Church
