= Servant of God =

Catholic title denoting piety

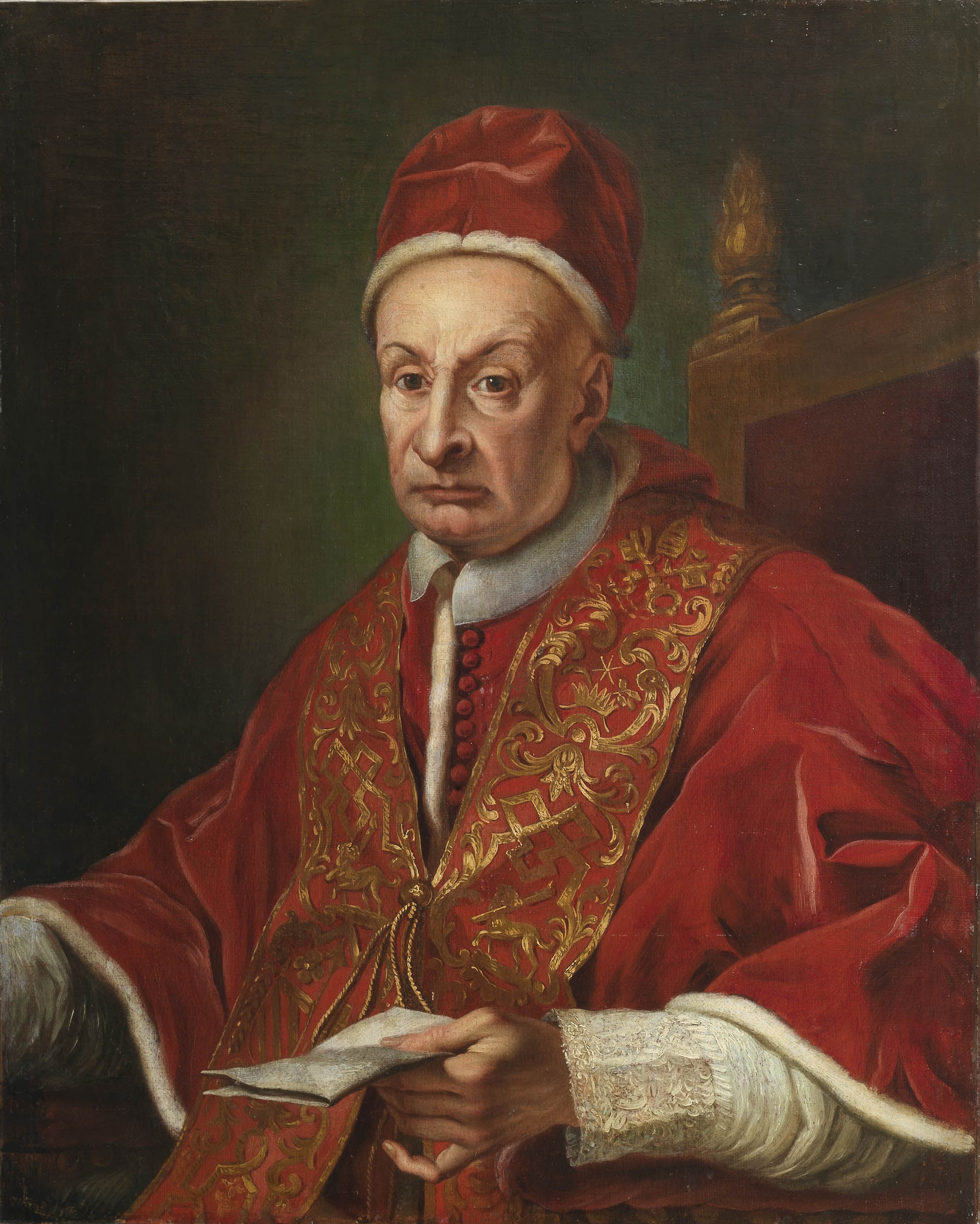
Pope Benedict XIII is one of the popes titled a Servant of God.

Servant of God (Latin: Servus Dei) is a title used in the Catholic Church to indicate that, for an individual, a beatification process has been opened. In a canonical process, the so-called heroic virtue or the authenticity of martyrdom has been proved. The conferral is a procedural step in the beatification process and is based solely on the examination of a person's life by the Dicastery for the Causes of Saints, without examination or consideration of any miracles. The conferral is announced in the presence of the Pope.

== Terminology ==
The expression Servant of God appears nine times in the Bible, the first five in the Old Testament, the last four in the New. The Hebrew Bible refers to Moses as "the servant of Elohim" (עֶֽבֶד הָאֱלֹהִ֛ים ‘eḇeḏ-hā’ĕlōhîm; 1 Chronicles 6:49, 2 Chronicles 24:9, Nehemiah 10:29, and Daniel 9:11). Judges 2:8 and 2 Timothy 2:15 refer to Joshua as "the slave of Yahweh" (עֶ֣בֶד יְהוָ֑ה, ‘eḇeḏ Yahweh).

The New Testament also describes Moses in this way in Revelation 15:3 (τοῦ δούλου τοῦ Θεοῦ, tou doulou tou Theou). Paul calls himself "a servant of God" in Titus 1:1 (δοῦλος Θεοῦ, doulos Theou), while James calls himself "a servant of God and the Lord Jesus Christ" (θεοῦ καὶ κυρίου Ἰησοῦ χριστοῦ δοῦλος, Theou kai Kyriou Iēsou Christou doulos) in James 1:1. 1 Peter 2:16 describes "servants of God" (Θεοῦ δοῦλοι, Theou douloi) being free to act within the bounds of God's will. Following usage conventions established in the King James Bible, the word "servant" is never capitalized or used as a title of nobility. ("The servant is not greater than his lord.")

== Canonical process ==
Servant of God is an expression used for a member of the Catholic Church whose life and works are being investigated in consideration for recognition by the Pope and the Catholic Church as a Blessed. The term Servant of God (Latin: Servus Dei) should not be confused with Servus Servorum Dei (Servant of the Servants of God), one of the titles of the Pope.

The term Servant of God is used in the beginning of a beatification process. The next step is being declared venerable, upon a decree of heroic virtue or martyrdom. That is possibly followed by beatification, which means the veneration of the Blessed by the regional church. Finally, canonization can take place, at which point the person is venerated by the universal church. The process for canonization is under the jurisdiction of the Dicastery for the Causes of Saints.

Servant of God is not considered a canonical title in a strict sense by the Catholic Church (as for instance venerable or Blessed are), but only a technical term used in the beatification process. Hence, any of the faithful can be named a Servant of God in a larger frame of meaning. As the Church waits upon God to confirm a servant of God's status through a miracle before invoking him or her in public prayer, the church states that "one must also refrain, even outside of Church, from any acts which could mislead the faithful into thinking that the inquiry conducted by the Bishop into the life of the Servant of God and his virtues or martyrdom carries with it the certitude that the Servant of God will be one day canonized".

== See also ==
- List of Servants of God
- Candidates for sainthood
