= Milan Chautur =

His Grace, The Most Reverend Milan Chautur C.Ss.R.
- Eparchial Bishop Emeritus of Slovak Catholic Eparchy of Košice
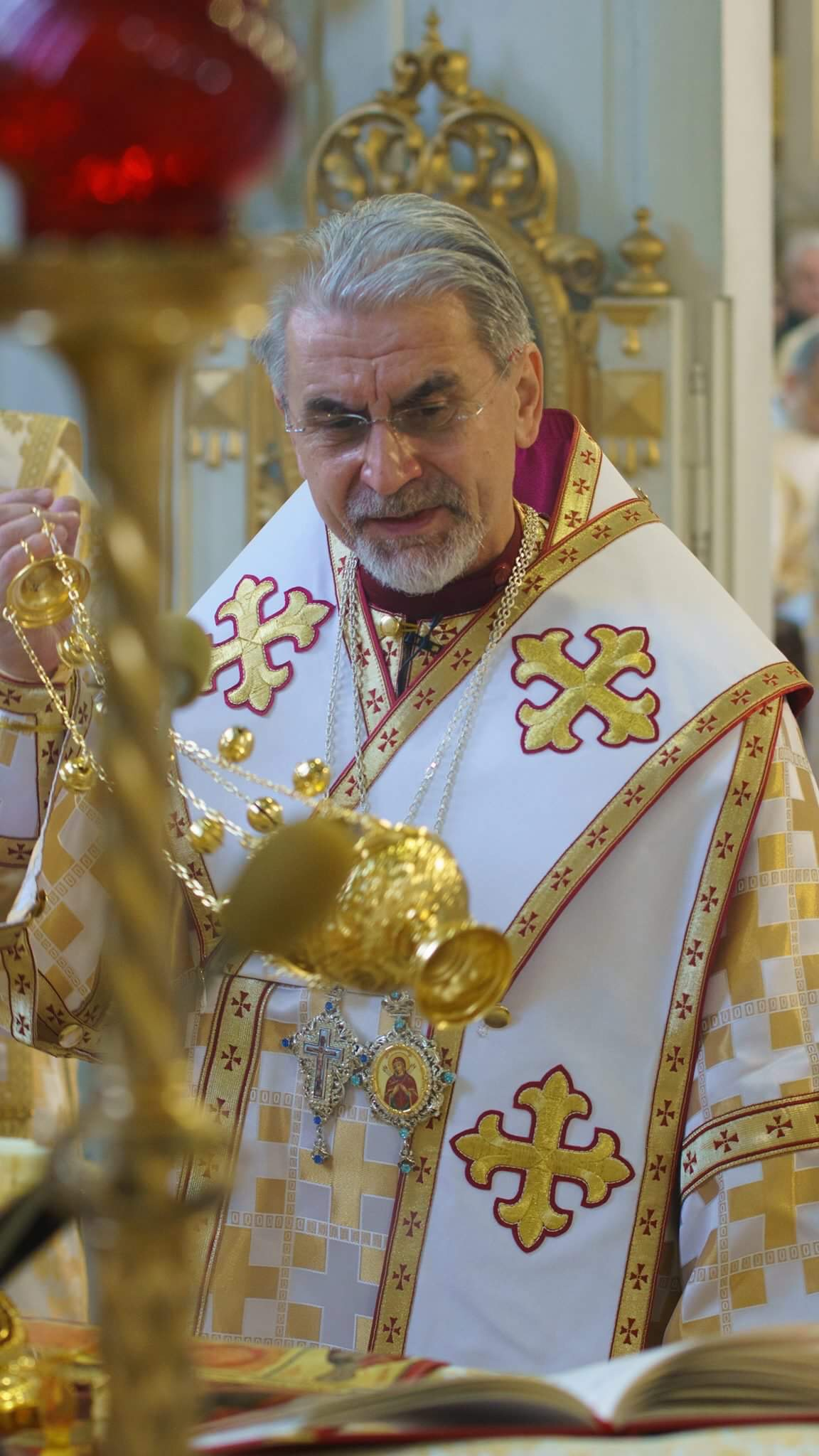
- Church: Slovak Greek Catholic Church
- Appointed: 27 January 1997 (as Apostolic Exarch); 30 January 2008 (as Eparchial Bishop)
- Retired: 24 June 2021
- Predecessor: New creation
- Successor: Cyril Vasiľ
- Other posts: Titular Bishop of Cresima (1992–2008); Auxiliary Bishop of Slovak Catholic Eparchy of Prešov (1992–1997)

Orders
- Ordination: 14 June 1981 (Priest) by Joakim Segedi
- Consecration: 29 February 1992 (Bishop) by Jan Hirka

Personal details
- Born: Milan Chautur; 4 September 1957 (age 68) Snina, Czechoslovakia (present day Slovakia)
- Coat of arms

Milan Chautur, C.Ss.R. (born 4 September 1957 in Snina, Czechoslovakia, present day Slovakia) is a Slovak Greek Catholic hierarch, who served as the first Bishop of the Slovak Catholic Eparchy of Košice from 30 January 2008 until his resignation on 24 June 2021.

Previously he was an auxiliary bishop of the Slovak Catholic Eparchy of Prešov from 11 January 1992 until 27 January 1997 and the Apostolic Exarch of Košice from 29 January 1997 until 30 January 2008.

== Life ==
Chautur was born to a Greek-Catholic family in the Prešov Region of the Eastern Slovakia, but he grew up in the village of Veľká Poľana, which no longer exists. Following his graduation from gymnasium in Humenné, he joined the Congregation of the Most Holy Redeemer.

In the Congregation Chautur made a profession on 2 August 1974 and a solemn profession on 2 August 1980. He was ordained as priest on 14 June 1981, after completed philosophical and theological studies in the Roman Catholic Faculty of Theology of Cyril and Methodius at the Comenius University in Bratislava.

After ordination he served as a parish priest, but during 1982–1984 was forced to make a compulsory service in the Czechoslovak People's Army. Then he continued to serve as a parish priest in Medzilaborce (1984–1985), Šmigovec (1985–1989) and Porúbka (1989–1992). For his active pastoral activity with the youth he was in the attention of the State Security of the Communist regime of the Czechoslovak Socialist Republic. On July 1, 1990, he was elected as a Vice-Provincial of the Slovak Redemptorist Province based in Michalovce.

On 11 January 1992, Chautur was appointed and on 29 February 1992 he was consecrated to the Episcopate as an Auxiliary Bishop of Slovak Catholic Eparchy of Prešov and the Titular Bishop of Cresima. The principal consecrator was Bishop Jan Hirka, the Head of the Slovak Greek Catholic Church.

On 27 January 1997, he was named first Exarch of the newly created Apostolic Exarchate of Košice. On 30 January 2008, Slovak Greek Catholic Church was promoted as a sui iuris church and Exarchate was promoted as Slovak Catholic Eparchy of Košice. Bishop Milan Chautur was promoted as its first bishop.

In January he requested Pope Francis to accept his resignation, that was accepted on 24 June 2021. He was succeeded by Archbishop Cyril Vasiľ.

By the end of the year, in November, sources have emerged stating, that Chautur was suffering from leukemia and further reports further revealed orthopedic issues. Following his retirement from Eparchal see, he went on to reside in a Redemptorist Monastery in Michalovce.

Catholic Church titles
| Preceded by Joseph Francis Cleary | Titular Bishop of Cresima; 1992–2008 | Succeeded by Éric de Moulins-Beaufort |
| New title | Apostolic Exarch of Košice; 1997–2008 | Succeeded by himself as Eparchial Bishop |
| Preceded by himself as Apostolic Exarch | Eparchial Bishop of Košice; 2008–2021 | Succeeded by Cyril Vasiľ |
