= Cyril Vasiľ =

Slovak Jesuit and Greek Catholic archbishop (born 1965)

The Most Reverend Cyril Vasiľ S.J.
- Eparchial Archbishop-Bishop of Slovak Catholic Eparchy of Košice
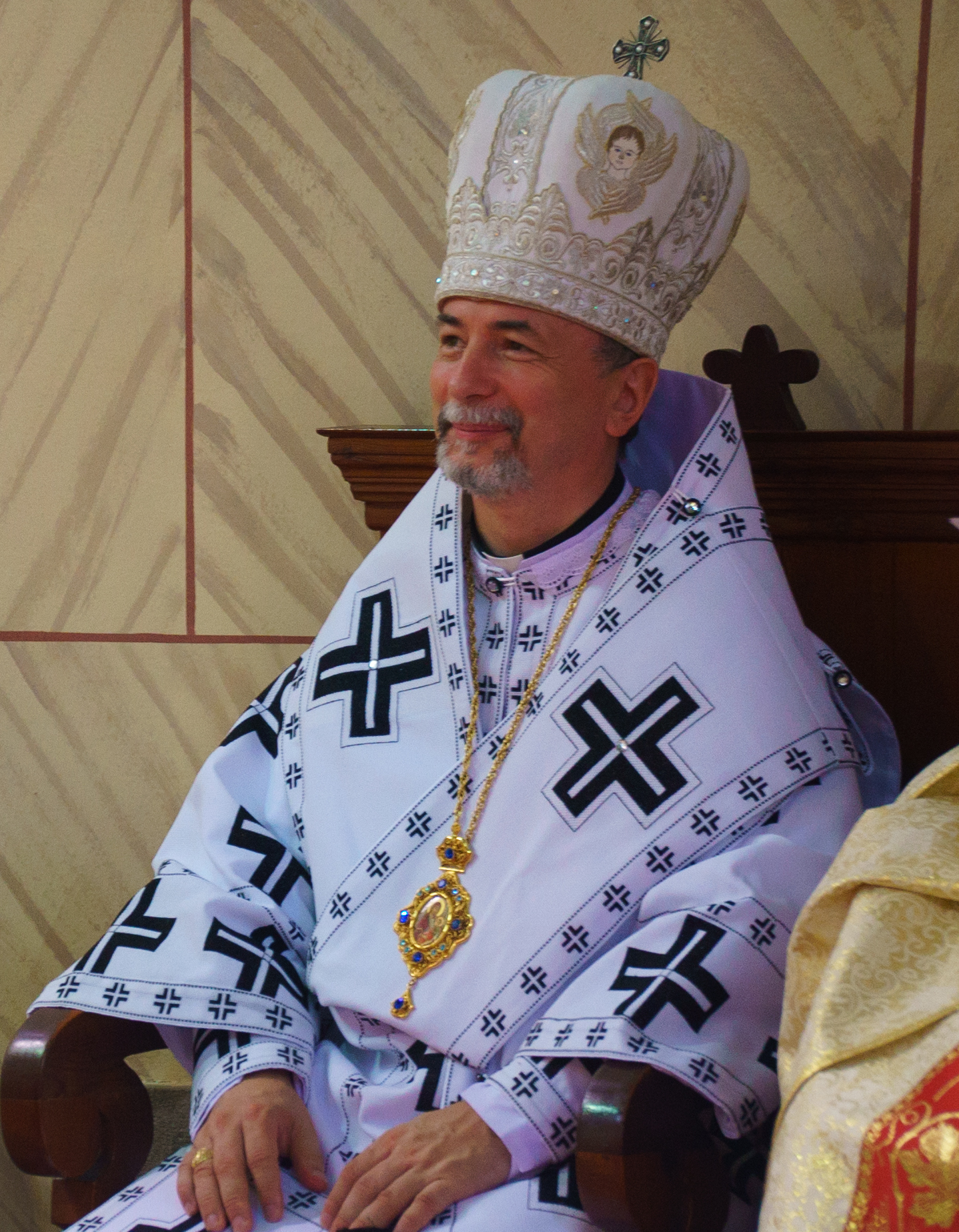
- Appointed: 7 May 2009
- Previous posts: Secretary of the Congregation for the Oriental Churches (2009–2020), Pontifical Delegate to the Major Archeparchy of Ernakulam–Angamaly (2024–2025)

Orders
- Ordination: 14 June 1987 by Slavomir Miklovš
- Consecration: 14 June 2009 by Slavomir Miklovš

Personal details
- Born: Cyril Vasiľ; 10 April 1965 (age 61) Košice, Czechoslovakia
- Motto: Parati Semper - ready always
- Coat of arms

Styles of Cyril Vasil
- Reference style: The Most Reverend
- Spoken style: Your Excellency
- Religious style: Monsignor

Cyril Vasiľ, S.J. (born 10 April 1965) is a Slovak Jesuit prelate who has served as Eparch of Košice in the Slovak Greek Catholic Church since June 2021, after serving as apostolic administrator there for 16 months. He holds the personal title of archbishop.

Vasil held leadership positions at the Pontifical Oriental Institute from 2002 to 2008. He was made a titular archbishop in 2009 and held that title while serving as secretary of the Congregation for the Oriental Churches from 2009 to 2020 and while apostolic administrator of Košice. From 2023 to 2025, he served as Pontifical Delegate to the Syro-Malabar Catholic Major Archeparchy of Ernakulam–Angamaly to resolve liturgical disputes.

== Biography ==
Vasiľ was born in Košice, Slovakia, on 10 April 1965. From 1982 to 1987, he attended the Faculty of Theology of Cyril and Methodius in Bratislava. He was ordained priest for the Slovak Greek Catholic Church in 1987. In 1989, he obtained the licentiate in canon law at the Pontifical Oriental Institute in Rome. On 15 October 1990, he entered the Society of Jesus and in 2001 made his solemn profession. In 1994 he obtained a doctorate in Eastern Canon Law at the Pontifical Oriental Institute.

In 2002, he was elected dean and pro-rector of the Faculty of Eastern Canon Law at the Pontifical Oriental Institute; in May 2007 he was selected rector. He was the first member of the Slovak Greek Catholic Church to hold that post.

He was a Consultor to the Congregation for the Oriental Churches, the Congregation for the Doctrine of the Faith, and the Pontifical Council for the Pastoral Care of Migrants and Itinerants. He was appointed an expert to the 2005 Synod of Bishops on the Eucharist. He was also a professor in the Pontifical Gregorian University, the Theological Faculty of the University of Bratislava and the University of Trnava. In 2003, he was appointed Spiritual Director of the Union Internationale des Guides et Scouts d′Europe. He served as Spiritual Director of this traditional faith-based scouting organization until 2007.

On 7 May 2009, Pope Benedict XVI appointed him Titular Archbishop of Ptolemais in Libya and Secretary of the Congregation for the Oriental Churches. He received his episcopal consecration on 14 June 2009 from Slavomir Miklovš, Bishop Emeritus of Križevci, Croatia.

On 21 January 2010, he was named a consultor to the Pontifical Council for Promoting Christian Unity.

On 20 January 2020, he was named Apostolic administrator sede plena of the Slovak Catholic Eparchy of Košice, following a private audience with Pope Francis on 18 January. After bishop Milan Chautur resigned on 24 June 2021, Pope Francis named him second eparchial bishop of Eparchy of Košice, while allowed him to use title of archbishop.

On 31 July 2023, Pope Francis named him Pontifical Delegate to the Syro-Malabar Catholic Major Archeparchy of Ernakulam–Angamaly and charged him with studying and overcoming resistance to the adoption of a uniform liturgy. He said he was not tasked with negotiating between the disputing parties but with implementing the liturgy adopted by the Syro-Malabar Synod. Following the adoption of compromise arrangement, commencing on 3 July 2025, Vasiľ was relieved of delegate duties on 7 July.

He is the author of numerous books and articles and has worked with Vatican Radio.

Preceded by Antonio Maria Vegliò	Secretary of the Congregation for the Oriental Churches; 7 May 2009 – 20 January 2020	Succeeded by Giorgio Demetrio Gallaro
Preceded by Milan Chautur	Eparchial Bishop of Košice; 24 June 2021 –	Succeeded by Incumbent
