= Pontifical Delegation for the Shrine of Our Lady of the Rosary of Pompeii =

Catholic delegation in Pompei, Italy

The Pontifical Delegation for the Shrine of Our Lady of the Rosary of Pompeii is the office, vested in a Pontifical Delegate, that represents the Holy See in the administration of the papal minor basilicas and Shrine of Our Lady of the Rosary of Pompeii.

== History ==
It was founded in 1996 as one of the new Pontifical delegations taking over the shrines previously entrusted collectively to the then suppressed Commission of Cardinals for the Pontifical Shrines of Pompeii, Loreto and Bari.

== Pontifical delegates ==
(So far, all Italian Archbishops holding the prelature of (Bishop-)Prelate of the Territorial Prelature of Pompei, de facto rendering the appointment an honorary sinecure)

- Archbishop Carlo Liberati (2003.11.05 – 2012.11.10), Bishop-Prelate of Pompei (Italy) (2003.11.05 – 2012.11.10)
- Archbishop Tommaso Caputo (2012.11.10 – ...), Bishop-Prelate of Pompei (Italy) (2012.11.10 – ...)

== Source and External links ==
- GigaCatholic, with incumbent biography links
