= Cathedral of the Nativity of the Mother of God, Košice =

Slovakian Greek Catholic church

Coordinates: 48°43′14″N 21°15′10″E

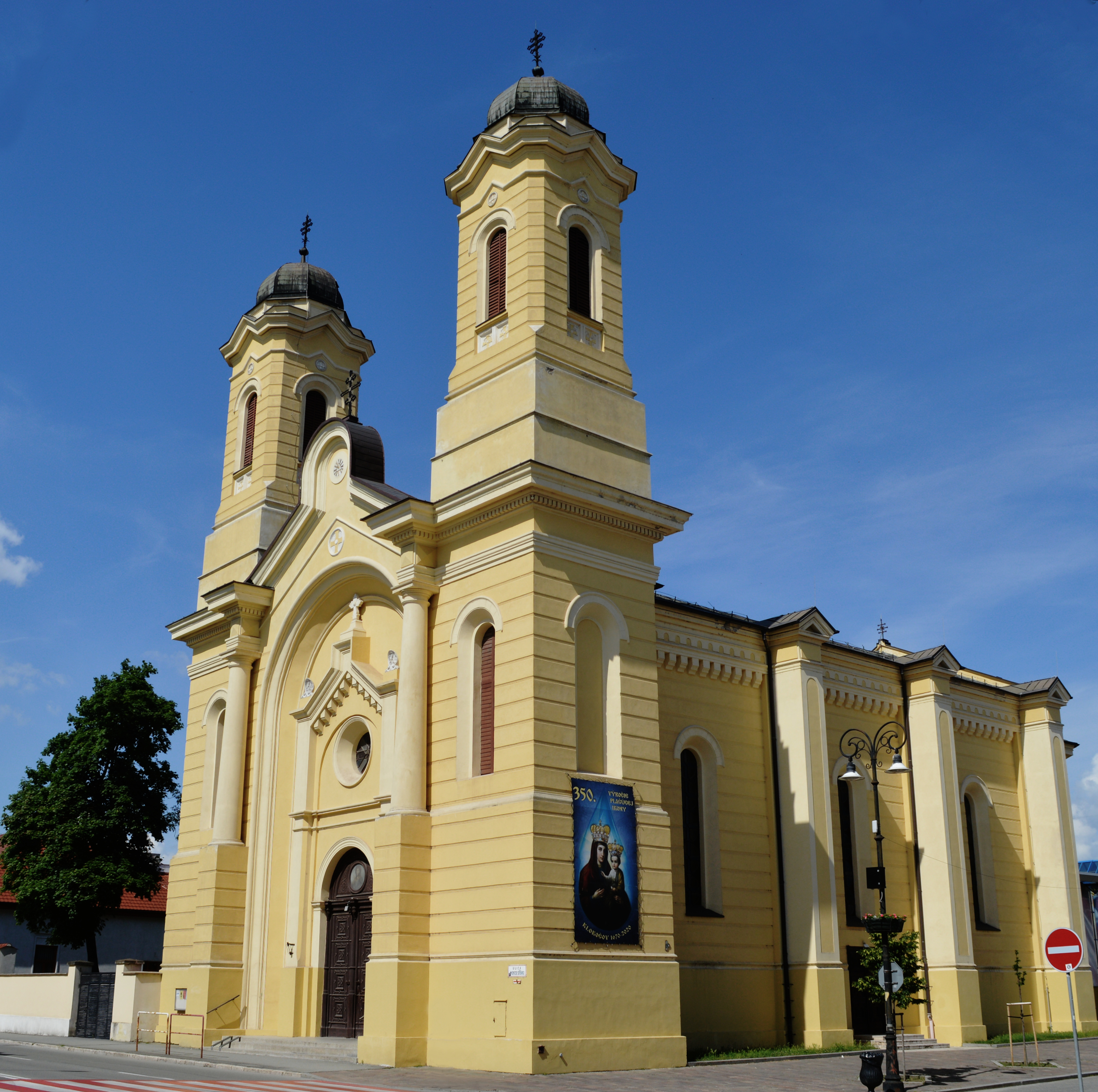
The Greek Catholic Church of Virgin Mary's Birth

The Greek Catholic Cathedral Church of Virgin Mary's Birth (Slovak: Gréckokatolícky katedrálny chrám Narodenia presvätej Bohorodičky) is located at Moyzesova Street in the historic centre of Košice, Slovakia. It is the cathedral of the Eparchy of Košice of the Slovak Greek Catholic Church.

Greek Catholics started to settle in Košice in the 17th century. As late as 1852 their bishop established a chapel in Košice. Till then, the divine services were served in the Franciscan Church, and rarely at the Premonstrates or in St. Michael Chapel.

In 1880, the community were able to buy grounds near the chapel and to build the church in the years 1882–1898.

In the Communist era of former Czechoslovakia, the church was given to the Eastern Orthodox Church after the banning of the Greek Catholic (Byzantine Catholic) Church. After 1990, it was returned to the Greek Catholics and the church was restored and repaired to its current condition.

== Gallery ==
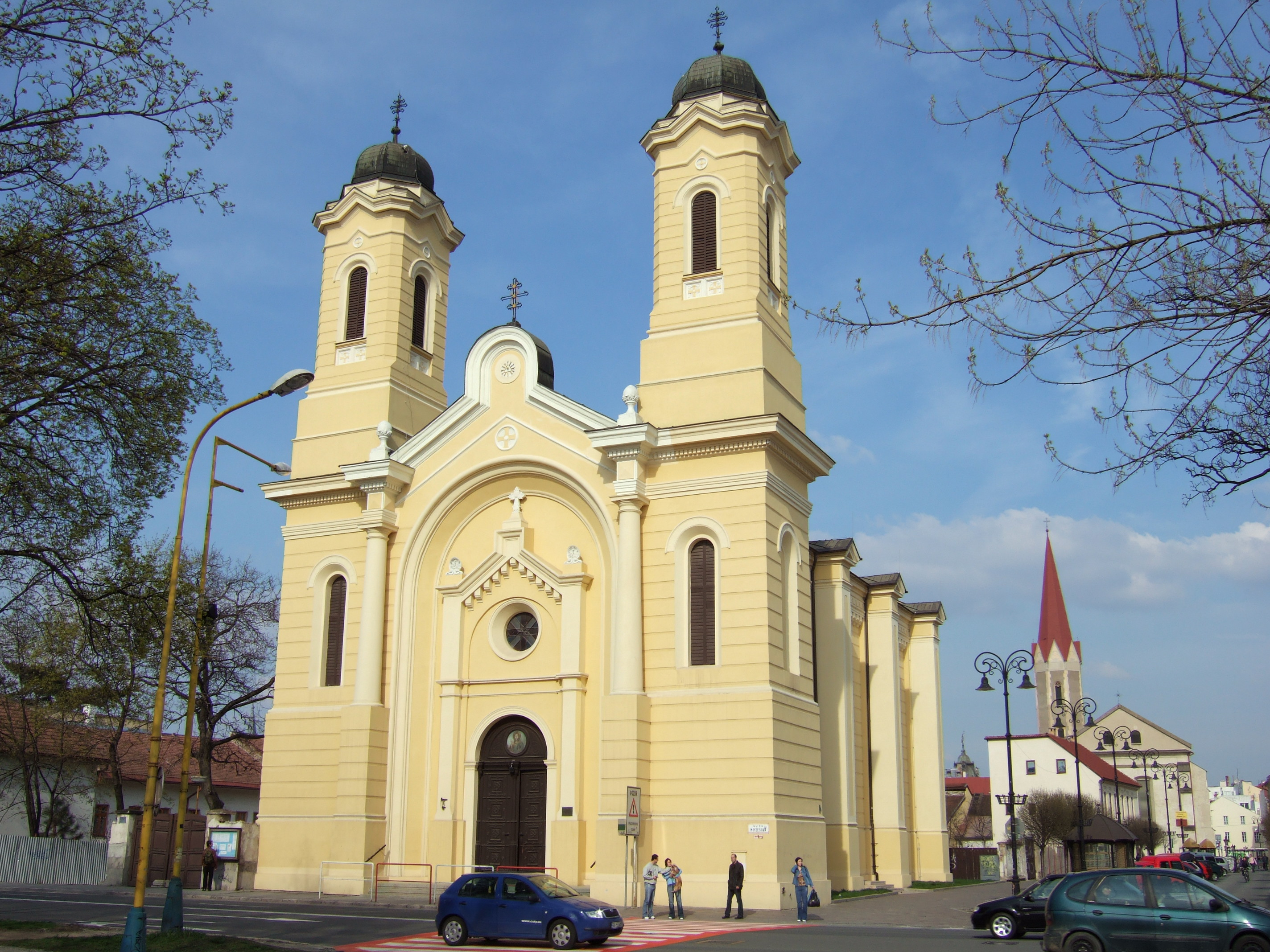
The Greek Catholic Church of Virgin Mary's Birth

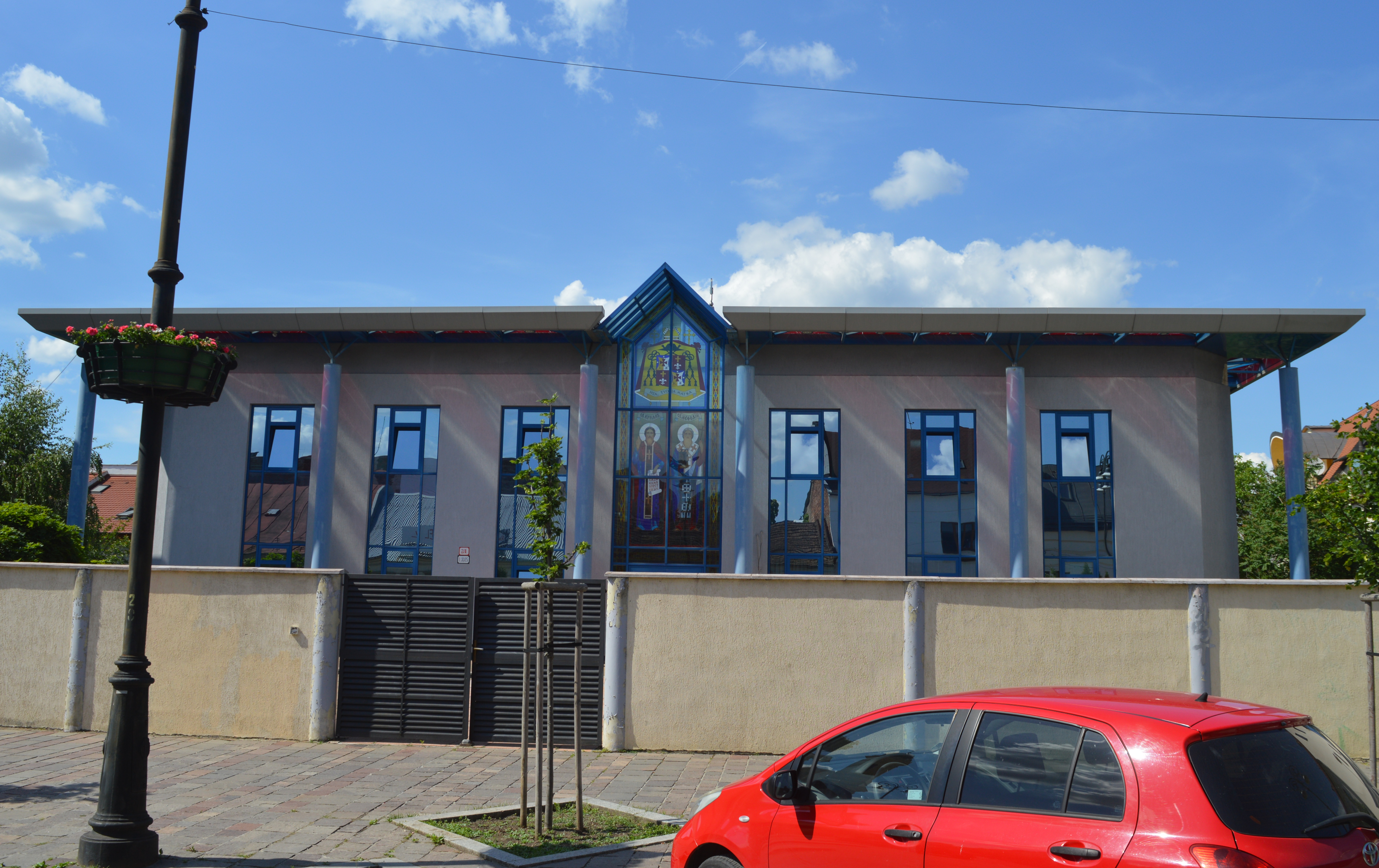
Greek-Catholic Eparchy

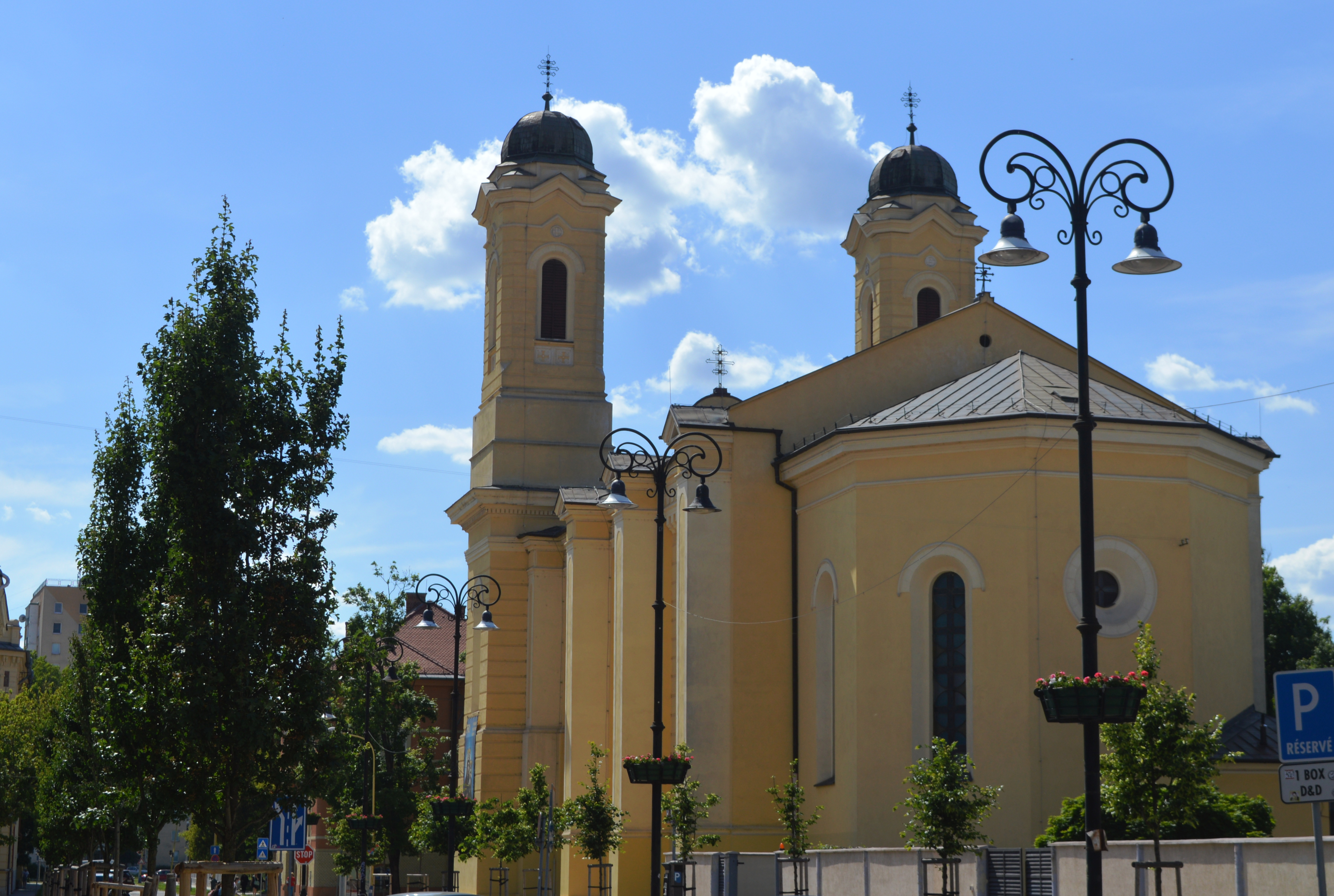
Greek Catholic Cathedral from the other side, 2021
