= Slovak Catholic Eparchy of Košice =

Eastern Catholic eparchy in Slovakia

Coordinates: 48°43′N 21°15′E

Eparchy of Košice Eparchia Kosicensis Košická eparchia
- Coat of arms

Location
- Country: Slovakia
- Ecclesiastical province: Prešov
- Population: (as of 2013); 72,593

Information
- Denomination: Catholic Church
- Sui iuris church: Slovak Greek Catholic Church
- Rite: Byzantine Rite
- Established: 30 January 2008 (21 February 1997 - Exarchate)
- Cathedral: Cathedral of the Nativity of the Mother of God in Košice
- Patron saint: Saints Cyril and Methodius

Current leadership
- Pope: Leo XIV
- Eparch: Cyril Vasiľ
- Metropolitan Archbishop: Vacant
- Bishops emeritus: Milan Chautur

Map
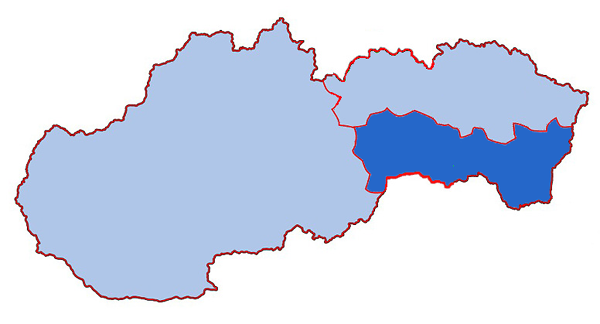

Website
- Website of the Diocese

The Eparchy of Košice is an eparchy (diocese) of the Slovak Greek Catholic Church that is situated in south-eastern Slovakia. Its episcopal seat is the Cathedral of the Nativity of the Mother of God in the city of Košice. The eparchy is a suffragan of the metropolitan Archeparchy of Prešov. As an Eastern Catholic church, it uses the Byzantine Rite in the Slovak, Hungarian and Church Slavonic languages.

== History ==
- Established on 27 January 1997 by Pope John Paul II as the Apostolic Exarchate of Košice, on territory that was split from the Eparchy of Prešov.
- Elevated on 30 January 2008 by Pope Benedict XVI to the Slovak Catholic Eparchy of Košice.

== List of eparchs ==
- Milan Chautur (27 January 1997 – 24 June 2021)
  - named eparch 30 January 2008
- Cyril Vasiľ (24 June 2021 – present)
  - apostolic administrator sede plena (20 January 2020 – 24 June 2021)
