= Porúbka, Bardejov District =

Porúbka
- Municipality
- Flag

- Location of Porúbka in the Prešov Region Location of Porúbka in Slovakia
- Coordinates: 49.20°N 21.43°E
- Country: Slovakia
- Region: Prešov Region
- District: Bardejov District
- First mentioned: 1427

Area
  - Total: 3.14 km^{2} (1.21 sq mi)
- Elevation: 203 m (666 ft)

Population (2025)
  - Total: 209
- Time zone: UTC+1 (CET)
  - Summer (DST): UTC+2 (CEST)
- Postal code: 864 6
- Area code: +421 54
- Vehicle registration plate (until 2022): BJ
- Website: www.obec-porubka.sk

Porúbka (Hungarian: Tapolyortovány) is a village and small municipality in Bardejov District in the Prešov Region of north-east Slovakia.

== History ==
In historical records the village was first mentioned in 1427. Before the establishment of independent Czechoslovakia in 1918, Porúbka was part of Sáros County within the Kingdom of Hungary. From 1939 to 1945, it was part of the Slovak Republic. On 15 January 1945, the Red Army and the 1st Czechoslovak Army Corps dislodged the Wehrmacht from Porúbka and it was once again part of Czechoslovakia.

== Geography ==
The municipality lies at an altitude of 203 metres (666 ft) and covers an area of 3.14 km^{2} (1.21 sq mi) (2025).

== Population ==
Population statistic (10 years)
Year	1995	2005	2015	2025
Count	248	233	218	209
Difference		−6.04%	−6.43%	−4.12%

Population statistic
Year	2024	2025
Count	213	209
Difference		−1.87%

It has a population of 209 people (31 December 2025).

=== Ethnicity ===
Census 2021 (1+ %)
Ethnicity	Number	Fraction
Slovak	215	96.41%
Not found out	8	3.58%
Total	223	

In year 2021 was 223 people by ethnicity 215 as Slovak, 8 as Not found out, 1 as Czech, 1 as Russian and 1 as Hungarian.

Note on population: The difference values of population numbers in the table "Population statistic" and in the sections "Ethnicity" & "Religion" is caused by the use of various statistical methods.

=== Religion ===
Census 2021 (1+ %)
Religion	Number	Fraction
Evangelical Church	101	45.29%
Roman Catholic Church	97	43.5%
Church of the Brethren	9	4.04%
Not found out	7	3.14%
None	7	3.14%
Total	223	

In year 2021 was 223 people by religion 101 from Evangelical Church, 97 from Roman Catholic Church, 9 from Church of the Brethren, 7 from Not found out, 7 from None and 2 from Greek Catholic Church.
