= Apostolic Syndic =

An Apostolic Syndic is a Catholic layman, who in the name, and by the authority, of the Holy See, assumes the care and civil administration of the temporalities and in particular the pecuniary alms destined for the support and benefit of Franciscan convents, and thence provides for the requirements of the brethren.

== History ==
To the Friars Minor, corporate as well as individual ownership was forbidden by the constitution or the rule. During the first years of the order's existence, the literal observance of this precept, being feasible as well as possible, presented no difficulty; but as time went on, and the order developed as a vast organization, and spread over the whole world, countless difficulties had to be faced and fierce controversy arose, the quaestio de paupertate lasting for centuries. To preserve and safeguard as far as possible the letter as well as the spirit of the complete "expropriation" advocated by Francis of Assisi, the popes adopted the fictio juris of assuming to themselves the ownership of all goods bestowed upon the friars. Thus the friars were legally regarded as mere users, the right of property being vested in the Roman pontiff, except in cases where the donors made explicit reservation in their own behalf. But as the civil administration of property in one's own interest is an act of ownership, and this was prohibited by the rule, such administration had to be exercised by a steward appointed, or at least authorized, by the Holy See.

According to the Decretal of Nicholas III, "Exiit qui seminat" (art. 12, n. 2) of 14 August 1279, the appointment of the Apostolic Syndic rested with the sovereign pontiff or the order's cardinal protector; sometimes bishops acted as their delegates in this matter; but Martin IV ("Exultantes", 18 January 1283) empowered the superiors of the order —the general, the provincials, and the custodes— within their respective spheres of jurisdiction, to appoint and remove syndics as circumstances might require.

The larger powers with which the syndic was invested by Martin IV and by his successors, Martin V ("Constitutiones Martinianae" in Wadding, "Annales", X, 301) and Paul IV ("Ex Clementi", 1 July 1555), gave rise to the appellation syndicus Martinianus in contradistinction to syndicus communis. This latter, as constituted by Nicholas III (Exiit) and Clement V ("Exivi de Paradiso", 6 May 1312), could deal only with movable property (valuables excepted) and with purchase moneys. The Martinian syndic on the other hand, as trustee and agent of the Holy See on behalf of the friars, might receive and dispose of all goods movable and immovable (money offerings, legacies, and remunerations) and, in pursuance of his trust, institute proceedings in the courts and take such other steps as might be deemed necessary to protect the interest of the community in whose favour he acted.

The Apostolic syndic and his wife and children were accorded the enjoyment of all and sundry indulgences, pardons, and privileges which the friars themselves have obtained, or shall obtain, from the Holy See (Clement VII, "Dum Consideramus", 16 April 1526).
