= Porúbka, Žilina District =

Village and municipality in Slovakia

Porúbka
- Municipality
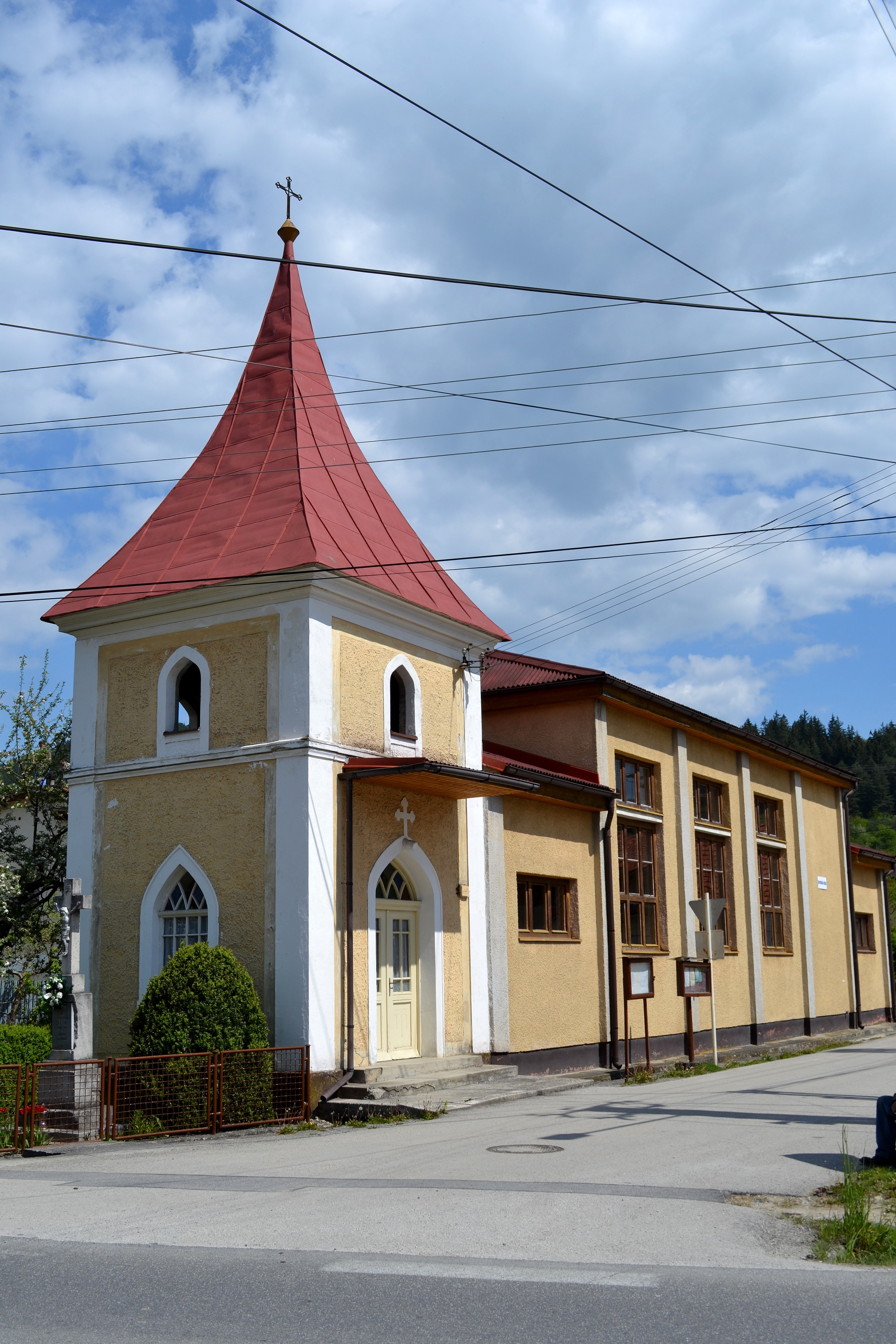

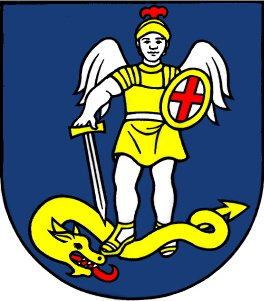
- Flag Coat of arms

- Location of Porúbka in the Žilina Region Location of Porúbka in Slovakia
- Coordinates: 49°09′15″N 18°43′30″E
- Country: Slovakia
- Region: Žilina Region
- District: Žilina District
- First mentioned: 1362

Area
  - Total: 3.45 km^{2} (1.33 sq mi)
- Elevation: 376 m (1,234 ft)

Population (2025)
  - Total: 531
- Time zone: UTC+1 (CET)
  - Summer (DST): UTC+2 (CEST)
- Postal code: 131 1
- Area code: +421 41
- Vehicle registration plate (until 2022): ZA
- Website: www.obecporubka.sk

Porúbka (Hungarian: Túrirtovány, until 1899 Porubka) is a village and municipality in Žilina District in the Žilina Region of northern Slovakia.

== History ==
In historical records the village was first mentioned in 1362.

== Geography ==
The municipality lies at an altitude of 376 metres (1,234 ft) and covers an area of 3.45 km^{2} (1.33 sq mi) (2025).

== Population ==
Population statistic (10 years)
Year	1995	2005	2015	2025
Count	444	449	481	531
Difference		+1.12%	+7.12%	+10.39%

Population statistic
Year	2024	2025
Count	519	531
Difference		+2.31%

It has a population of 531 people (31 December 2025).

=== Ethnicity ===
Census 2021 (1+ %)
Ethnicity	Number	Fraction
Slovak	517	99.23%
Total	521	

In year 2021 was 521 people by ethnicity 517 as Slovak, 5 as Russian, 4 as Not found out, 2 as Czech, 2 as Other, 1 as Austrian and 1 as Canadian.

Note on population: The difference values of population numbers in the table "Population statistic" and in the sections "Ethnicity" & "Religion" is caused by the use of various statistical methods.

=== Religion ===
Census 2021 (1+ %)
Religion	Number	Fraction
Roman Catholic Church	359	68.91%
None	94	18.04%
Not found out	48	9.21%
Greek Catholic Church	6	1.15%
Ad hoc movements	6	1.15%
Total	521	

In year 2021 was 521 people by religion 359 from Roman Catholic Church, 94 from None, 48 from Not found out, 6 from Greek Catholic Church, 6 from Ad hoc movements, 3 from Evangelical Church, 2 from Other, 1 from Old Catholic Church, 1 from Calvinist Church and 1 from Other and not ascertained christian church.
