= Servant of the servants of God =

One of the titles of the Pope

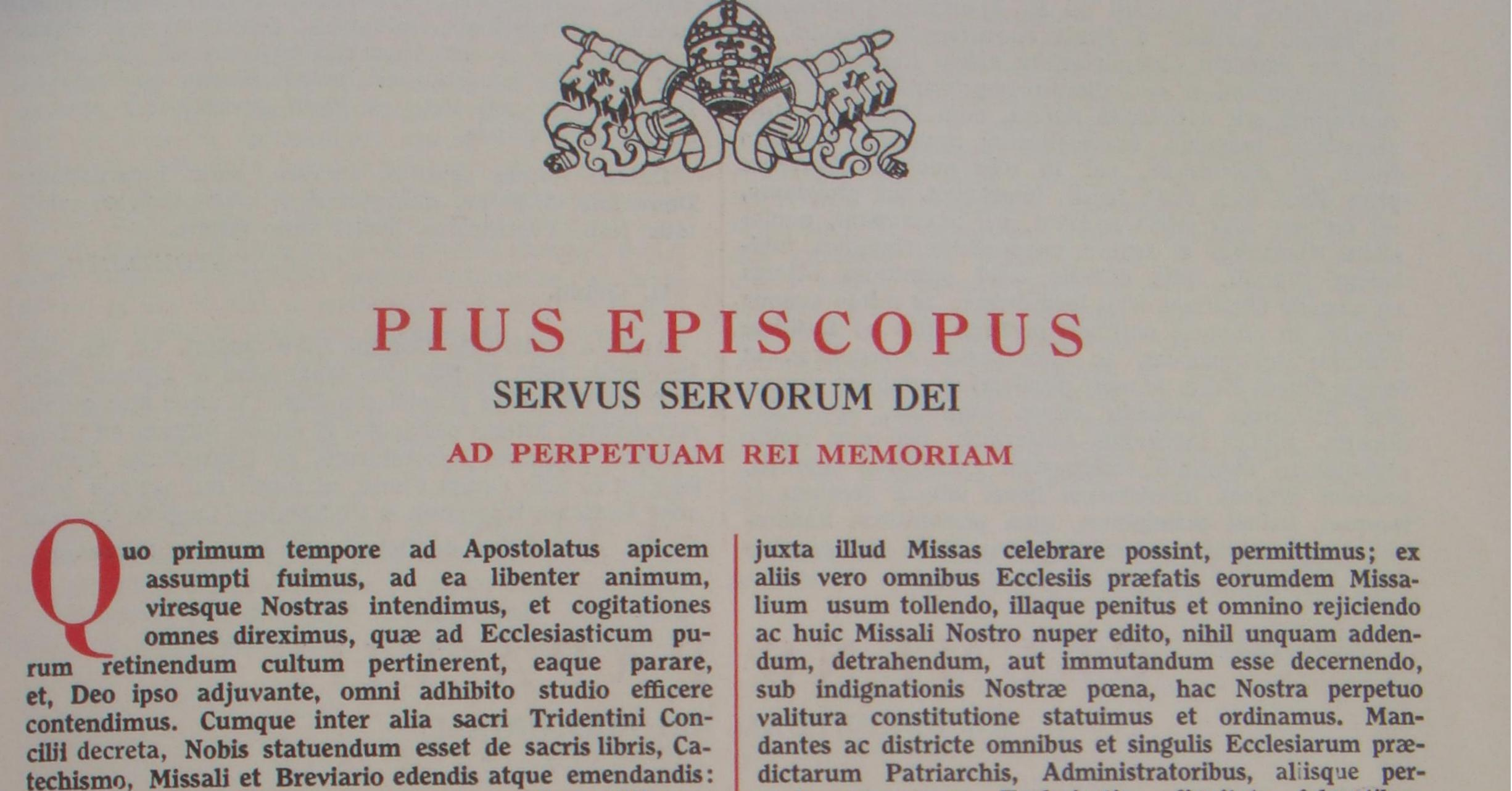
The 1570 bull Quo primum of Pope Pius V in a Roman Missal. Below the name of the Pope Pius Episcopus (Pius Bishop) appears his title Servus servorum Dei. Not all papal documents begin in this way, but bulls do.

"Servant of the servants of God" (Latin: servus servorum Dei) is one of the titles of the Pope and is used at the beginning of papal bulls.

== History ==
Pope Gregory I (pope from 590 to 604), the first Pope to use this title extensively to refer to himself, deployed it as a lesson in humility for the archbishop of Constantinople John the Faster (in office 582–595), who had been granted the traditional title "Ecumenical Patriarch" by a Council convened in Constantinople in 587. Gregory reportedly reacted negatively to the Patriarch's title, claiming that "whoever calls himself universal bishop [the imprecise Latin translation of "Ecumenical Patriarch"], or desires this title, is, by his pride, the precursor to the Antichrist."

== Bibliography ==
- Camillo Ruini (2007). Alla sequela di Cristo : Giovanni Paolo II, il servo dei servi di Dio [Imitating Christ: John Paul II, the servant of the servant of God] (in Italian). Siena: Cantagalli. p. 103. ISBN 9788882722982. OCLC 238896950.
- George Weigel (September 14, 2010). The end and the beginning : Pope John Paul II : the victory of freedom, the last years, the legacy. New York: Crown Publishing Group- Doubleday. p. 556. ISBN 9780307715869. OCLC 688480029.
