= Pontifical Delegate =

Catholic title with unrelated uses

A Pontifical Delegate is a cleric who is delegated by the Pope.

Specifically, this title is used for the following ecclesiastical offices in the gift of the Pope (who is Pontifex Maximus, hence the adjective):

- a prelate (usually an Archbishop or Cardinal) appointed to represent the Holy See in the administration of certain pontifical minor basilicas, notably:
  - Pontifical Delegation for the Basilica of St. Nicholas of Bari
  - Pontifical Delegation for the Shrine of the Holy House of Loreto
  - Pontifical Delegation for the Basilica of St. Anthony of Padua
  - Pontifical Delegation for the Shrine of Our Lady of the Rosary of Pompeii
- a papal legate or papal diplomat, such as a Nuncio
- an extraordinary papal representative to a religious congregation, e.g. the thirty-third General Congregation of the Jesuits
- a papal representative appointed to exercise certain rights reserved, thus limiting the authority of a major archbishop, as in the case of the Syro-Malabar Catholic Church

== See also ==
- Apostolic delegate
- Pontifical legate
