= Porúbka, Humenné District =

Porúbka
- Municipality
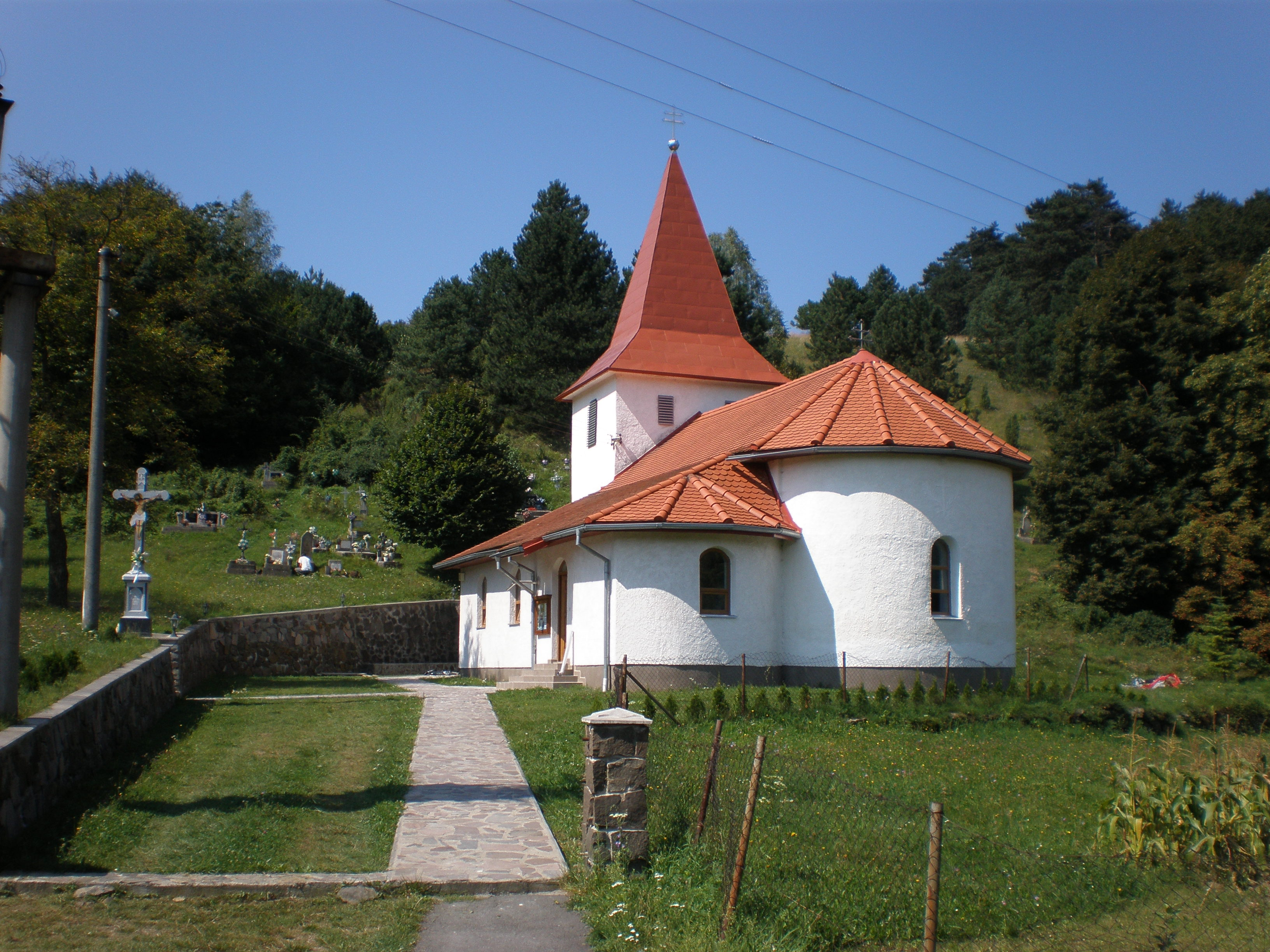

- Flag

- Location of Porúbka in the Prešov Region Location of Porúbka in Slovakia
- Coordinates: 48.86°N 21.96°E
- Country: Slovakia
- Region: Prešov Region
- District: Humenné District
- First mentioned: 1451

Area
  - Total: 4.32 km^{2} (1.67 sq mi)
- Elevation: 288 m (945 ft)

Population (2025)
  - Total: 261
- Time zone: UTC+1 (CET)
  - Summer (DST): UTC+2 (CEST)
- Postal code: 674 1
- Area code: +421 54
- Vehicle registration plate (until 2022): HE
- Website: www.porubkahe.sk

Porúbka (Hungarian: Kisortovány) is a village and municipality in Humenné District in the Prešov Region of north-east Slovakia.

== History ==
In historical records the village was first mentioned in 1451. Before the establishment of independent Czechoslovakia in 1918, Porúbka was part of Zemplén County within the Kingdom of Hungary. From 1939 to 1944, it was part of the Slovak Republic. On 26 November 1944, the Red Army dislodged the Wehrmacht from Porúbka and it was once again part of Czechoslovakia.

== Geography ==
The municipality lies at an altitude of 288 metres (945 ft) and covers an area of 4.32 km^{2} (1.67 sq mi) (2025).

== Population ==
Population statistic (10 years)
Year	1995	2005	2015	2025
Count	257	289	268	261
Difference		+12.45%	−7.26%	−2.61%

Population statistic
Year	2024	2025
Count	263	261
Difference		−0.76%

It has a population of 261 people (31 December 2025).

=== Ethnicity ===
Census 2021 (1+ %)
Ethnicity	Number	Fraction
Slovak	248	96.49%
Rusyn	10	3.89%
Not found out	6	2.33%
Total	257	

In year 2021 was 257 people by ethnicity 248 as Slovak, 10 as Rusyn, 6 as Not found out, 1 as Czech, 1 as Polish, 1 as Hungarian and 1 as Other.

Note on population: The difference values of population numbers in the table "Population statistic" and in the sections "Ethnicity" & "Religion" is caused by the use of various statistical methods.

=== Religion ===
Census 2021 (1+ %)
Religion	Number	Fraction
Greek Catholic Church	165	64.2%
Roman Catholic Church	75	29.18%
None	8	3.11%
Not found out	5	1.95%
Total	257	

In year 2021 was 257 people by religion 165 from Greek Catholic Church, 75 from Roman Catholic Church, 8 from None, 5 from Not found out, 2 from Eastern Orthodox Church, 1 from Buddhism and 1 from Ad hoc movements.
