= St. Stephen Cathedral (Phoenix, Arizona) =

Ruthenian Greek Catholic cathedral in the US

- St. Stephen Byzantine Catholic Cathedral
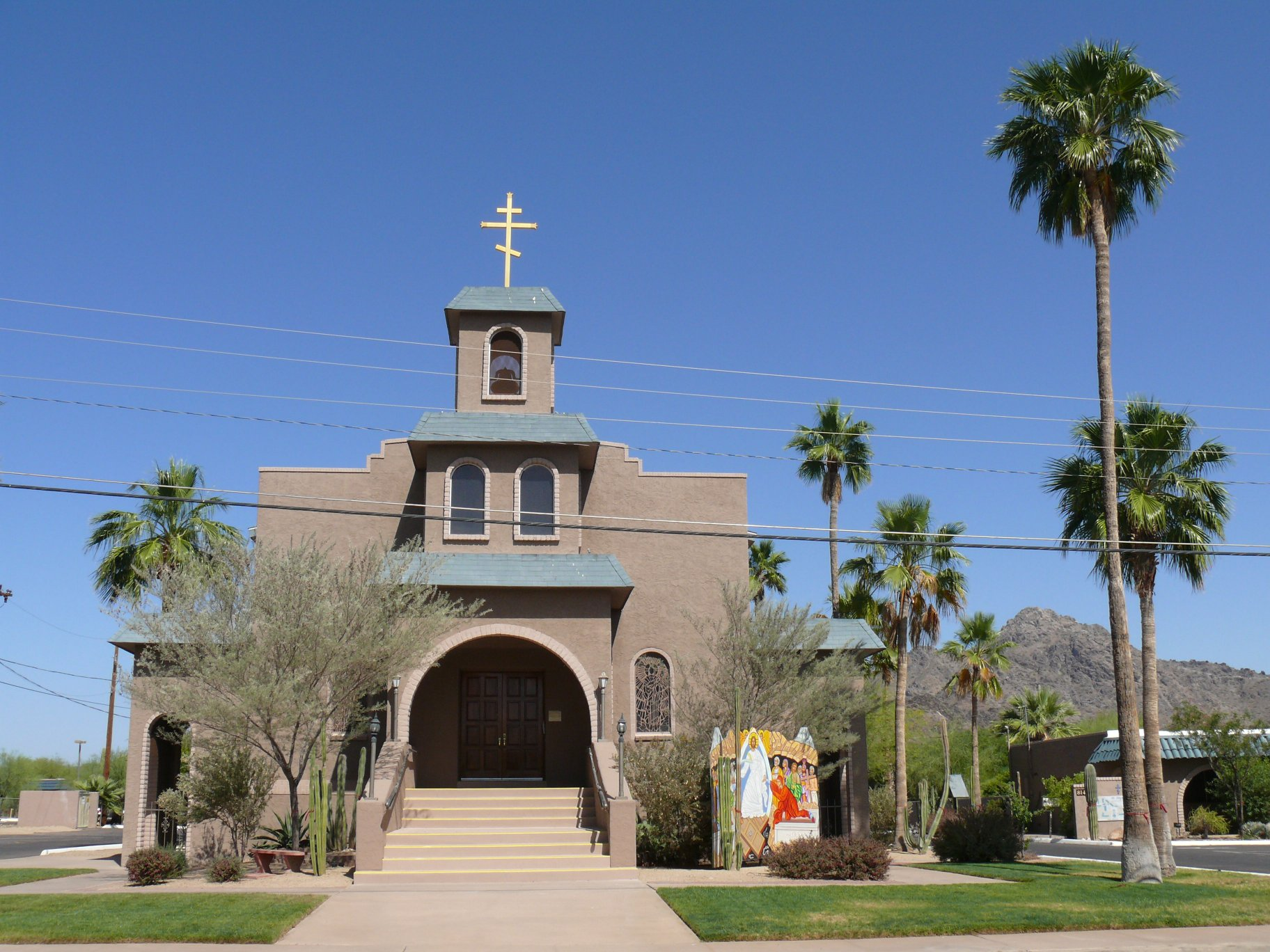
- Front view of the Cathedral

- Location within Arizona Location within the United States
- 33°33′24.36″N 112°02′51.59″W
- Location: 8141 N. 16th St. Phoenix, Arizona
- Country: United States
- Denomination: Catholic Church
- Sui iuris church: Ruthenian Catholic Church
- Website: www.stsbcc.org

History
- Founded: 1968

Administration
- Diocese: Holy Protection of Mary Byzantine Catholic Eparchy of Phoenix

Clergy
- Bishop: Most Rev. Artur Bubnevych
- Rector: Very Rev. Michael Mandelas

The St. Stephen Cathedral is a Ruthenian Greek Catholic cathedral located in Phoenix, Arizona, United States. It is the cathedral for the Holy Protection of Mary Byzantine Catholic Eparchy of Phoenix.

== History ==
Byzantine Catholics moved to the western United States from the east and in Phoenix they began to plan for a church of their own as early as 1956. Ten years later they formally requested a parish from Bishop Nicholas Elko of Pittsburgh. Permission was granted to acquire the property of the former St. Thomas the Apostle Antiochene Orthodox Church in 1968. The first Divine Liturgy was celebrated on Easter Sunday. The church was dedicated by Bishop Stephen Kocisko under the patronage of St. Stephen, the Proto-Martyr, on June 28, 1968. The Rev. Paul Bovankovich was appointed the parish's first pastor. A rectory and parish hall were built in 1974, and a columbarium was added in 1991.

The Northridge earthquake in 1994 damaged the chancery offices of the Eparchy of Van Nuys and the Cathedral of St. Mary. Bishop George Kuzma and his staff relocated to Phoenix and as a result St. Stephen's was named the pro-cathedral. In 2010 the Eparchy of Van Nuys was officially renamed the Holy Protection of Mary Byzantine Catholic Eparchy of Phoenix and St. Stephen's was elevated to a cathedral from its pro-cathedral status.

In 2016, Father Diodoro Mendoza was appointed rector and pastor of St. Stephen Cathedral. In 2016, Bishop John Stephen Pazak succeeded Bishop Gerald Nicholas Dino as the bishop. Bishop Dino died on November 14, 2020. Bishop Pazak retired in August 2021 and is a Bishop Emeritus. Bishop Thomas Olmsted served as Apostolic Administrator from 2018-2023, under appointment by Pope Francis. Bishop Kurt Burnette of the Byzantine Eparchy of Passaic succeeded Bishop Olmsted, and was appointed Apostolic Administrator of the Byzantine Catholic Eparchy of Phoenix by Pope Francis in 2023. The current eparch is Artur Bubnevych who was installed on 28 January 2025.

== Gallery ==
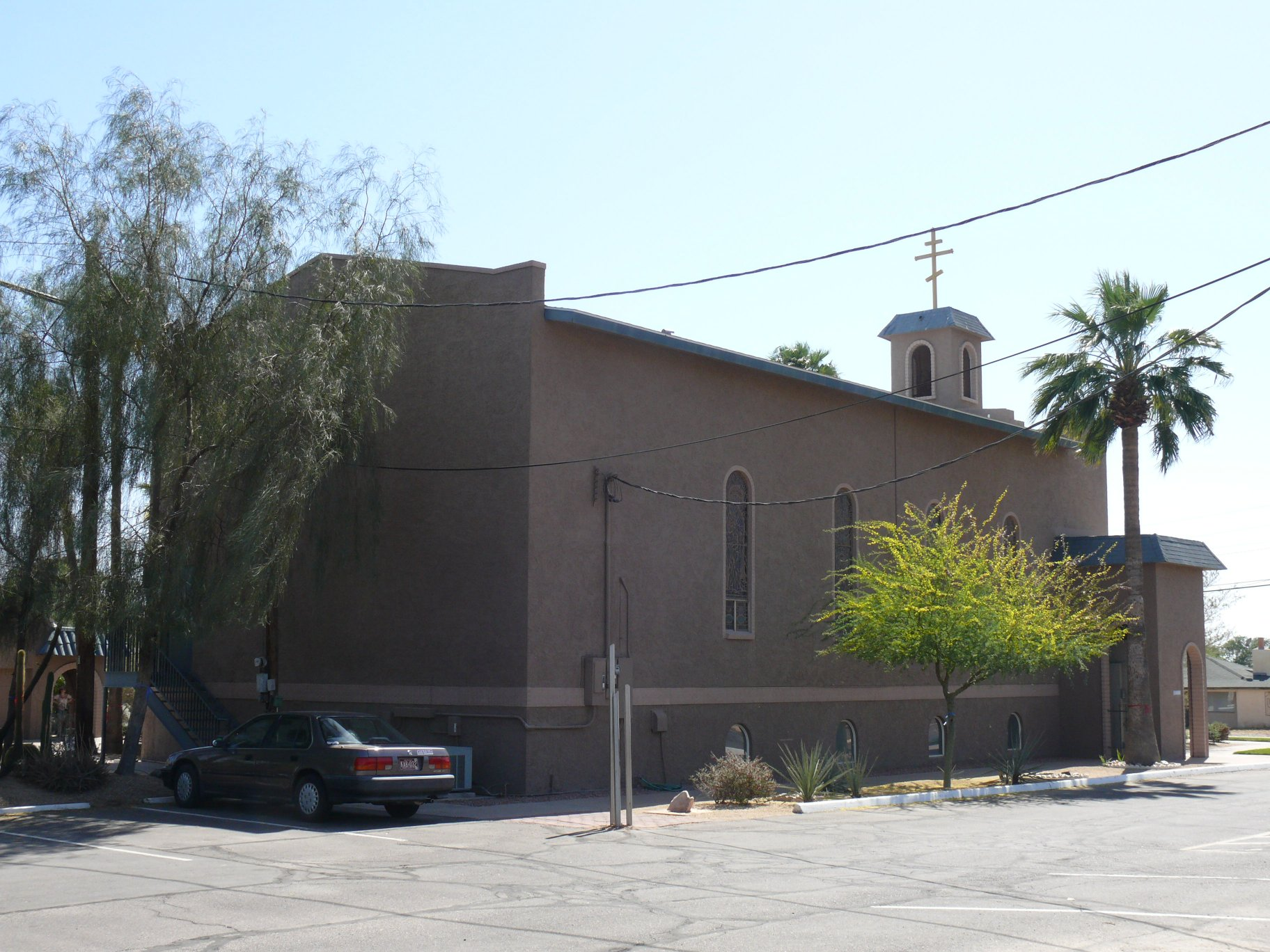
The church from behind

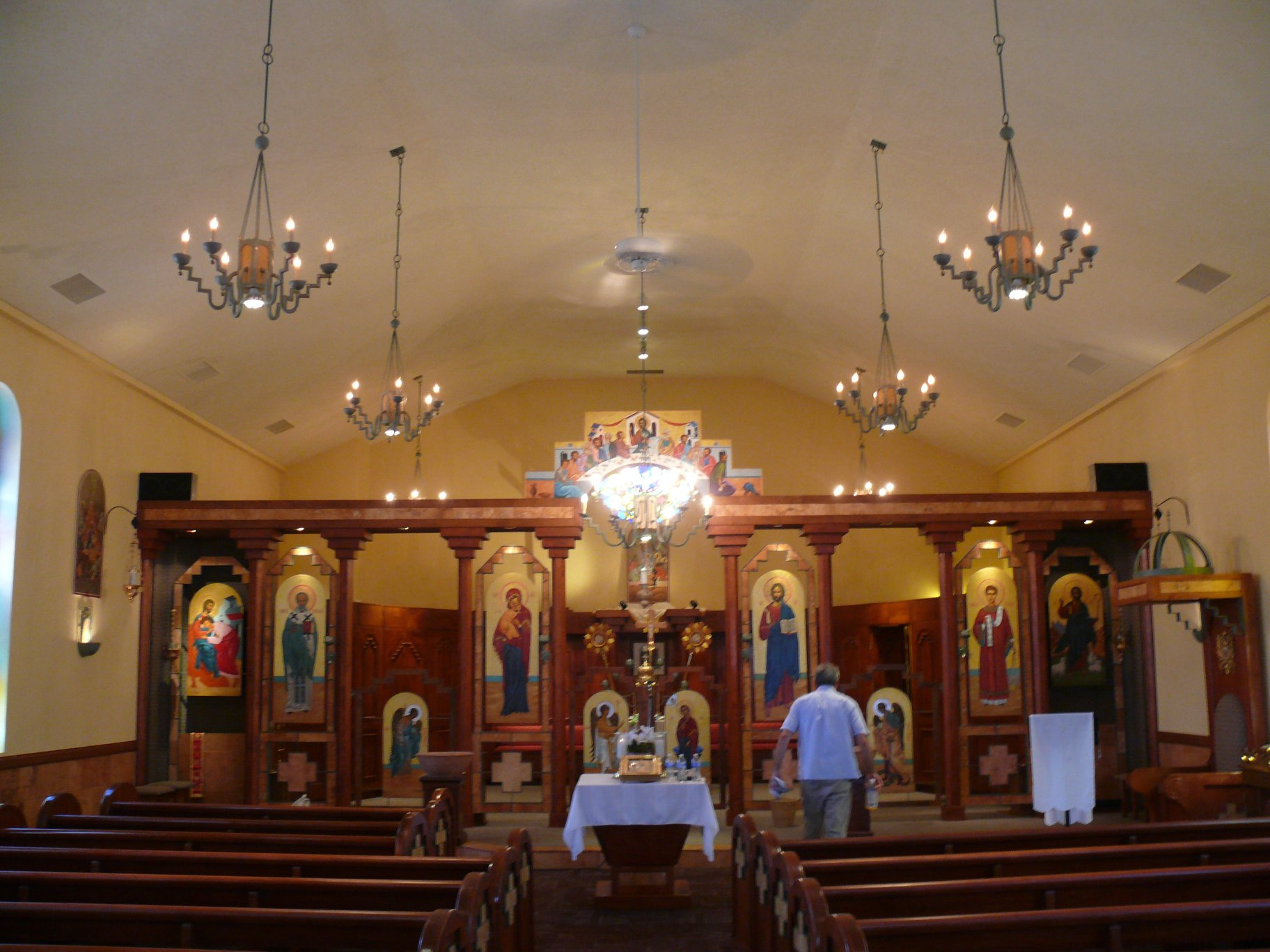
Iconostasis

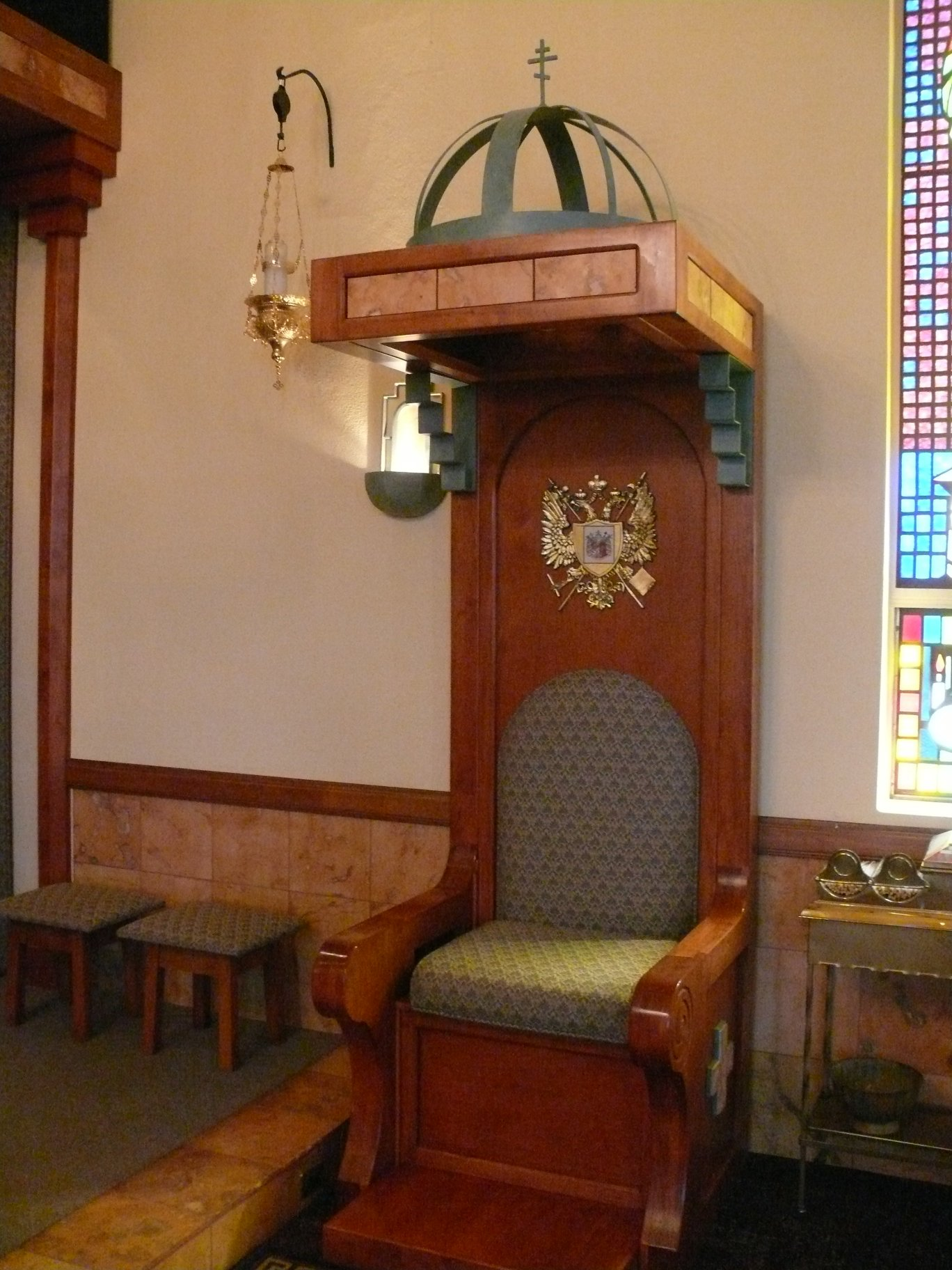
Chair

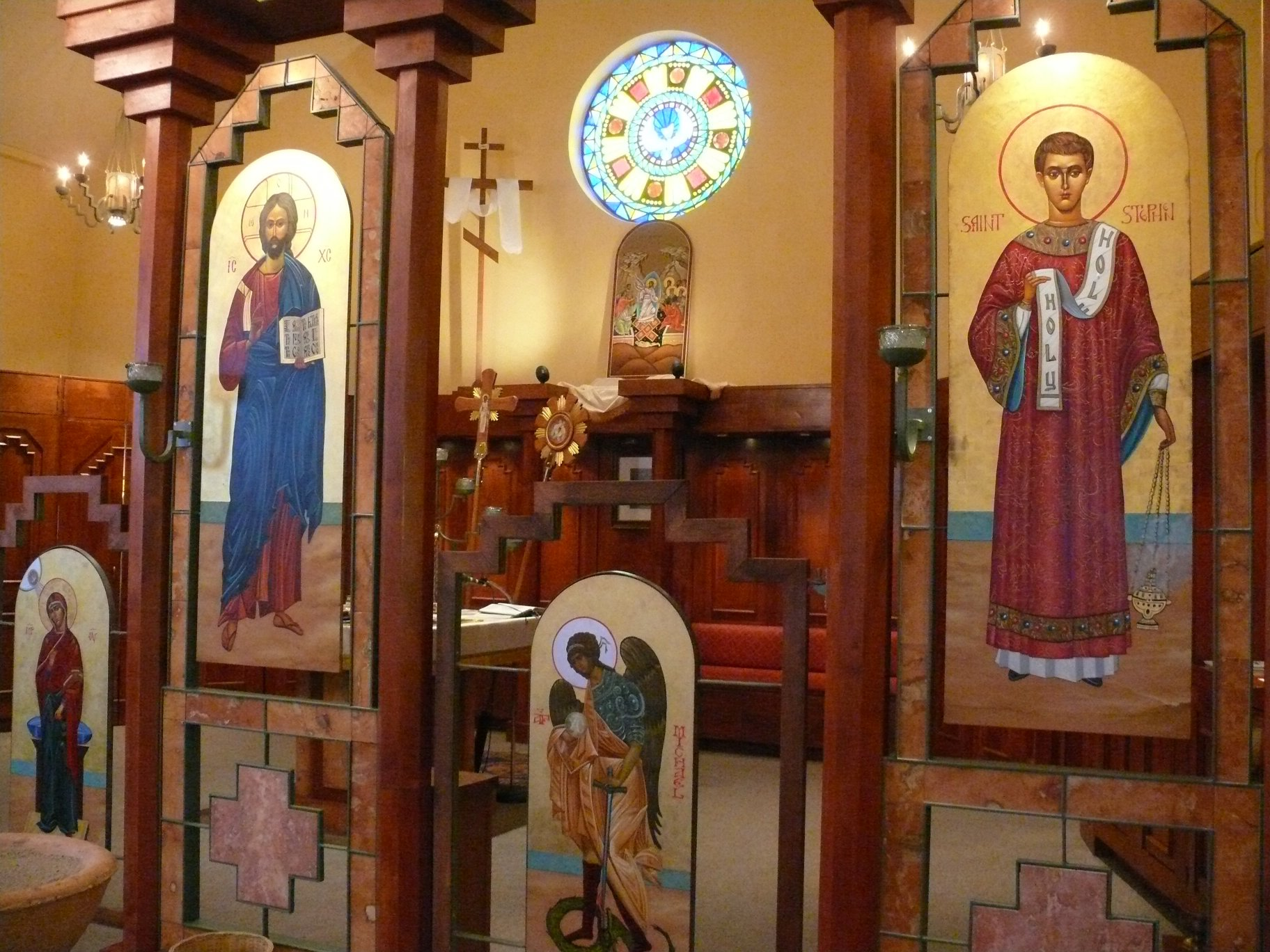
Deacon door

== See also ==
- List of Catholic cathedrals in the United States
- List of cathedrals in the United States
