= Saint Anne Byzantine Catholic Church =

Coordinates: 35.29474°N 120.6827°W

- Saint Anne Byzantine Catholic Church; 222 East Foothill Blvd. San Luis Obispo, CA 93405 www.stanneslo.org/

Religion
- Affiliation: Holy Protection of Mary Byzantine Catholic Eparchy of Phoenix
- Ecclesiastical or organisational status: Parish church
- Leadership: Most Rev. Bishop John S. Pazak, Byzantine Catholic Bishop of Phoenix; Father Michael Bezruchka, Pastor; Deacon John F. Bradley

Location
- Location: San Luis Obispo, California; United States
- Interactive map of Saint Anne Byzantine Catholic Church

Architecture
- Architect: David Tsow
- Style: California Mission with a Byzantine Influence
- General contractor: James V. Shepard & Co. Paso Robles, CA
- Completed: 2008
- Construction cost: $675,000 for remodeling

Specifications
- Direction of façade: North
- Capacity: 184 people

Saint Anne Byzantine Catholic Church is a Catholic Christian parish of the Byzantine Ruthenian Tradition located in the city of San Luis Obispo, California. It was founded in 1986. It is a parish of the Holy Protection of Mary Byzantine Catholic Eparchy of Phoenix.

== History ==
The history of the Byzantine Catholic Church on the Central Coast of California began in the early 1950s when the Petrick, Kubek and Bereczky families settled in San Luis Obispo. Father Anthony Kubek maintained his own private chapel, and for many years celebrated the Divine Liturgy for his family and other interested people. Father Eugene Bereczky also celebrated the Divine Liturgy at his own private chapel in San Luis Obispo during this era to support the needs of the small Eastern Catholic community. After the passing of Frs. Kubek and Bereczky, the community was ministered to for its sacramental needs by visiting priests from the former Pittsburgh Greek Catholic Exarchate including Father Joseph Ridella, Father Eugene Chromoga and Father John Lucas.

With the close of World War II, Eastern Catholics whose ancestors had settled and helped to establish parishes in Pennsylvania, New Jersey, Ohio and the Northeast were now migrating to the Western States. By the mid 1980s, former parishioners of the Cathedral of Saint Mary in Sherman Oaks and the Church of the Annunciation in Anaheim who had relocated to the Central Coast of California requested a priest from the Eparchy of Van Nuys to serve their spiritual needs. In 1986, Most Reverend Thomas Dolinay, the first Bishop of Van Nuys, sent his secretary, Father Edmund M. Idranyi, to ascertain the feasibility of beginning a new mission on the Central Coast.

San Luis Obispo was chosen as the perfect location, given its central location within the region. Through the good graces of Father James Nisbet, pastor of Old Mission San Luis Obispo de Tolosa, and with the approval of Most Reverend Thaddeus Shubsda, the Bishop of Monterey, the new San Luis Obispo/Santa Maria Byzantine Catholic Mission was given the use of the Old Mission's former convent chapel (now the Oratory of the Immaculate Heart of Mary) for Sunday Divine Liturgies. The first Divine Liturgy was celebrated on Sunday, June 22, 1986 with about 25 of the faithful in attendance. Father Idranyi was assigned to care for the new mission community while continuing his duties at the Eparchy's Chancery Office in Northridge, about 200 miles to the south of San Luis Obispo in the San Fernando Valley.

== Elevated to parish status and the purchase of premises ==
In the beginning, monthly and major holy day liturgies were celebrated for the growing community. Soon bi-weekly liturgies were the norm, and by September 1986, it was decided that the Divine Liturgy would be celebrated every Sunday and all major holy days. Bishop Dolinay visited the growing community two times, each time celebrating the Divine Liturgy in the main church of the Old Mission. On January 17, 1989, Bishop Dolinay raised the San Luis Obispo/Santa Maria Byzantine Catholic Mission to the canonical status of a parish under the patronage of Saint Anne, the Mother of Mary. Saint Anne was chosen as the patroness largely due to Father Idranyi's long-held devotion to her.

The growing parish was quickly outgrowing the Old Mission chapel. In 1990 the opportunity to secure a permanent facility arose. The former Disciples of Christ Church facility at 222 E. Foothill Boulevard was for sale. After protracted negotiations, Most Reverend George Kuzma, the second Bishop of Van Nuys gave permission to purchase the land and structure in 1991 for US$500,000. Bishop Kuzma was concerned that the young parish did not have a pastor, and about Father Idranyi having to commute between Northridge and San Luis Obispo; he assigned Father Idranyi to be the administrator and resident priest of Saint Anne Byzantine Catholic Church. Saint Anne's new home was ready for the celebration of the Divine Liturgy on Christmas Day of 1991. The church was blessed on the following January 6 by Bishop Kuzma.

== Parish maturity, church remodel and the future ==
On December 6, 2007, it was announced that Pope Benedict XVI had accepted the resignation of 80-year-old Bishop Andrew Pataki of the Byzantine Catholic Eparchy of Passaic and appointed Bishop William C. Skurla of the Byzantine Eparchy of Van Nuys, 51, as his successor. The pope also named the Reverend Gerald N. Dino, 67, protosyncellus of the Passaic Eparchy and pastor of St. George Parish, Linden, New Jersey, to succeed Skurla as bishop of Van Nuys. On March 27, 2008, Bishop Gerald N. Dino was ordained as the fourth bishop of the Eparchy of Van Nuys.

In 2008, Saint Anne's Church was redesigned by architect David Tsow and completely remodeled. The remodel included moving the sanctuary so the Divine Liturgy could be celebrated ad orientem, the installation of a new iconostasis, the creation of an office for the pastor, and a sound-proofed room set aside for the Sacrament of the Mystery of Reconciliation which is most certainly the tradition at Saint Anne Parish. On May 18, 2009, Bishop Gerald N. Dino announced the retirement of the Father Edmund Idranyi as Pastor of Saint Anne's Parish effective June 30, 2009. In the same communication he appointed Father Idranyi as Pastor Emeritus of Saint Anne's, recognizing his 23 years of service as the founding pastor of Saint Anne's. Bishop Gerald named Father James Lane as the new pastor of Saint Anne's effective July 1, 2009. On August 1, 2013, Father Milan Kasperek was appointed administrator of the parish.

Bishop John S. Pazak, C.Ss.R. of the Eparchy of Phoenix, named Father Michael Bezruchka as Saint Anne's new pastor, effective June 1, 2018, spurring great hope for the future.

== Gallery ==
Original – remodeling phase – current

Saint Anne's main entrance in 2007 prior to remodeling

Saint Anne's exterior facing Foothill Blvd. in 2008 prior to remodeling

Saint Anne's church interior in 2006 prior to remodeling

Saint Anne's church interior in 2006 prior to remodeling

Saint Anne's parish rectory in 2008 facing Foothill, Blvd.

Saint Anne's main entrance during remodeling

Saint Anne's church exterior remodeling

Gutted church interior during remodeling

Heroic on-site refinishing of Saint Anne's pews

Here comes the new stucco during remodeling

Saint Anne's main entrance in 2009 after remodeling

Saint Anne's exterior facing Foothill Blvd. in 2009 following remodeling

Saint Anne's church interior in 2009 after remodeling

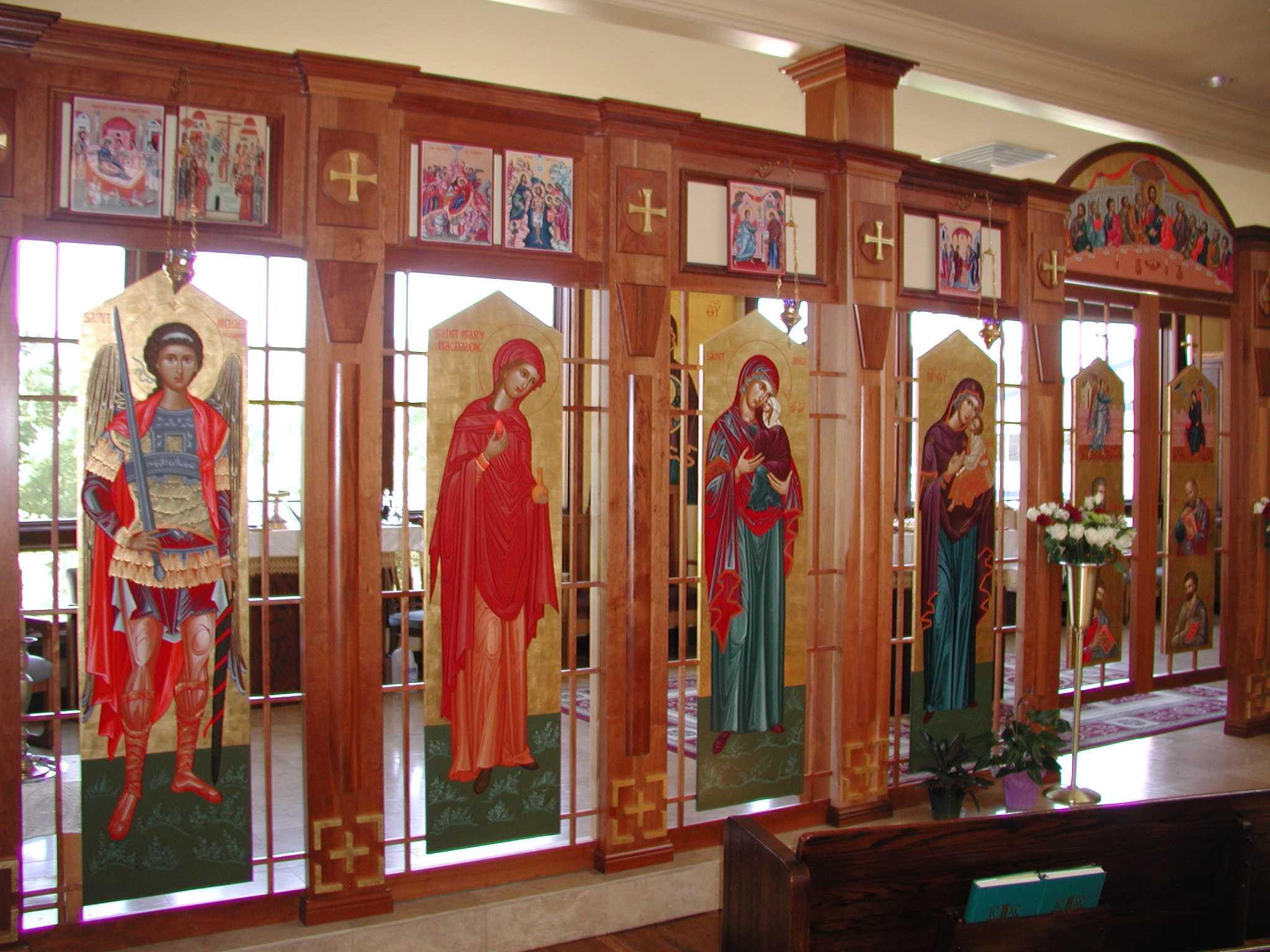
Saint Anne's church interior in 2013 after remodeling

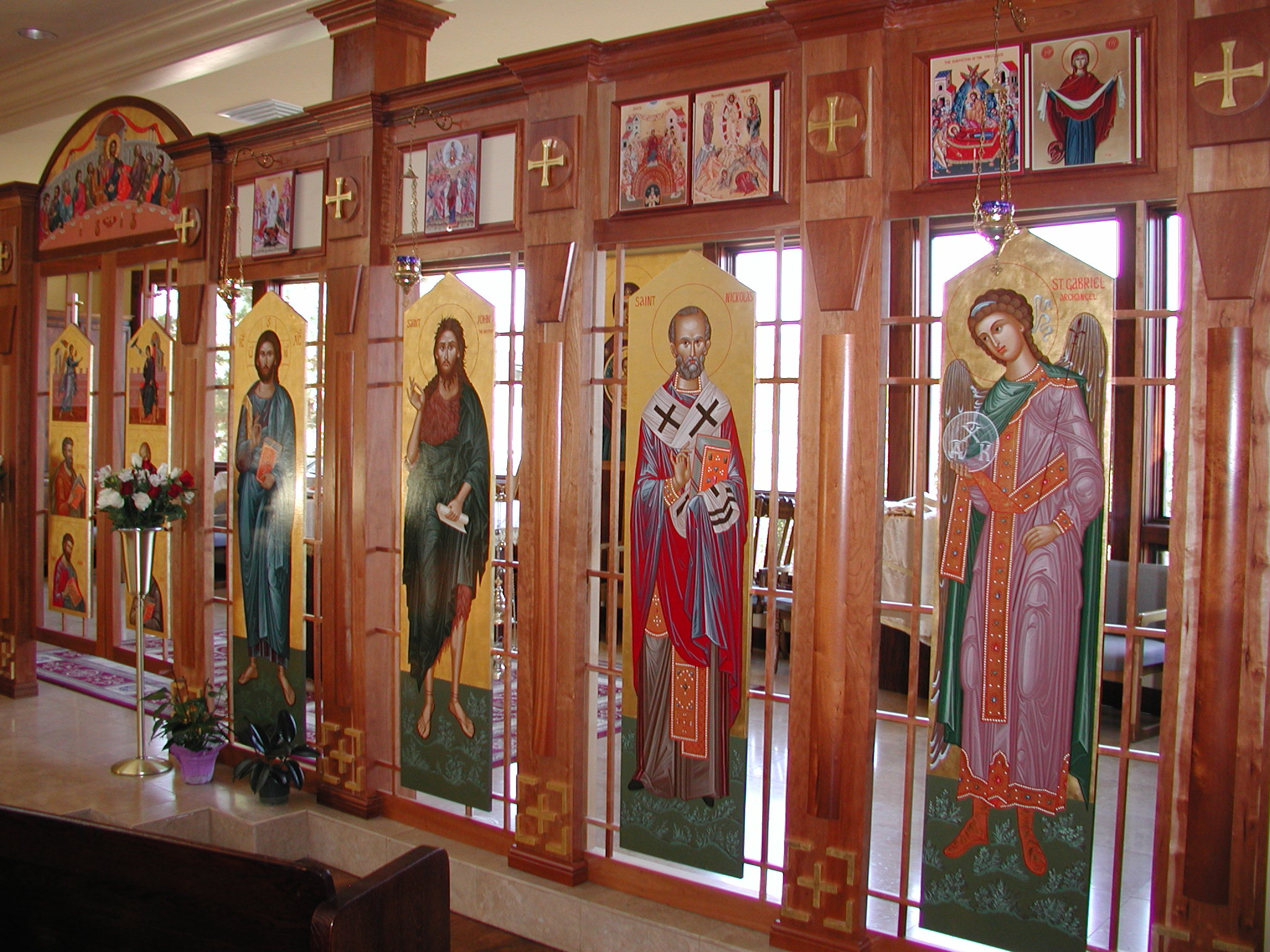
Saint Anne's church interior in 2013 after remodeling

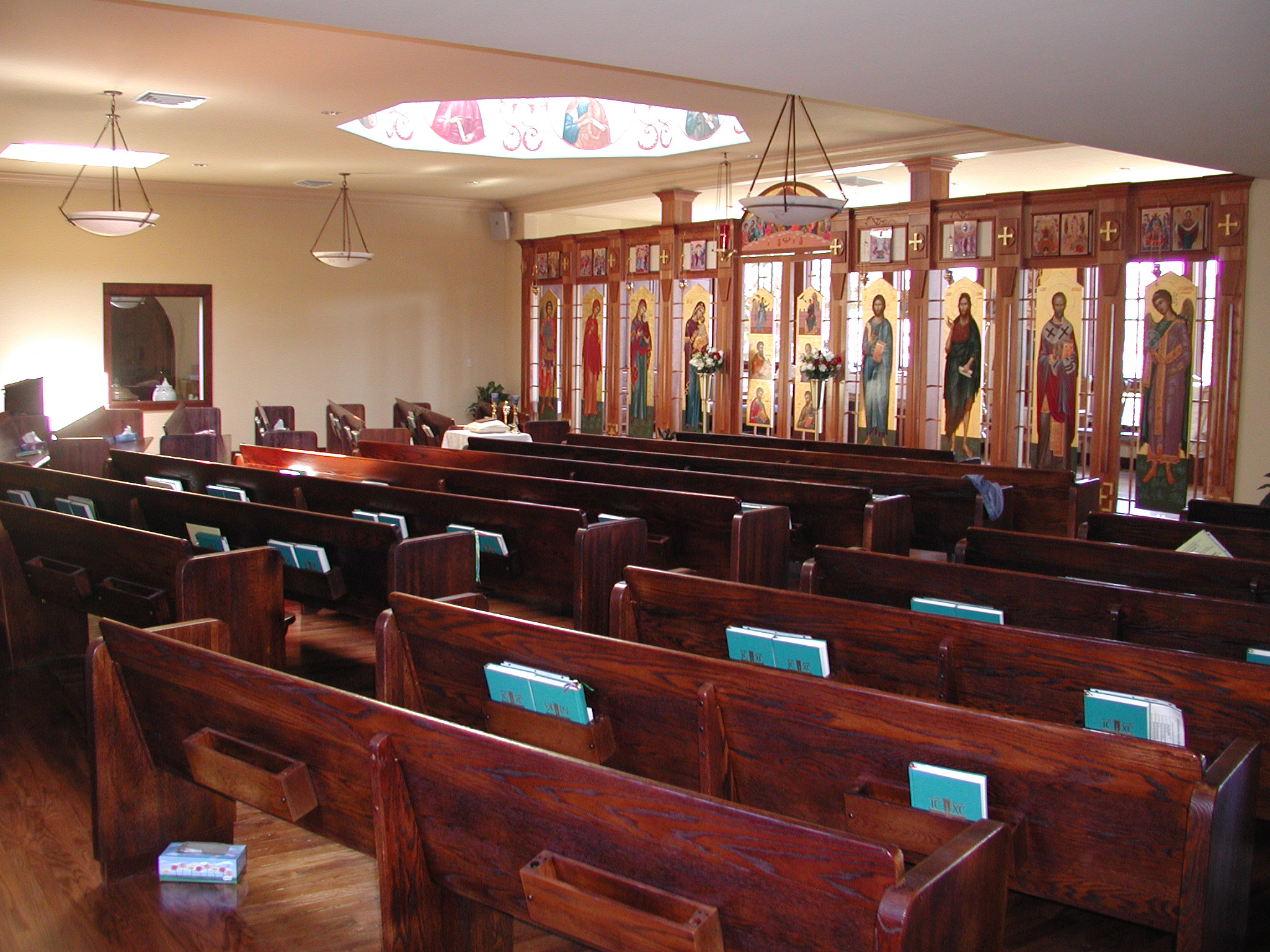
Saint Anne's church interior in 2013 after remodeling

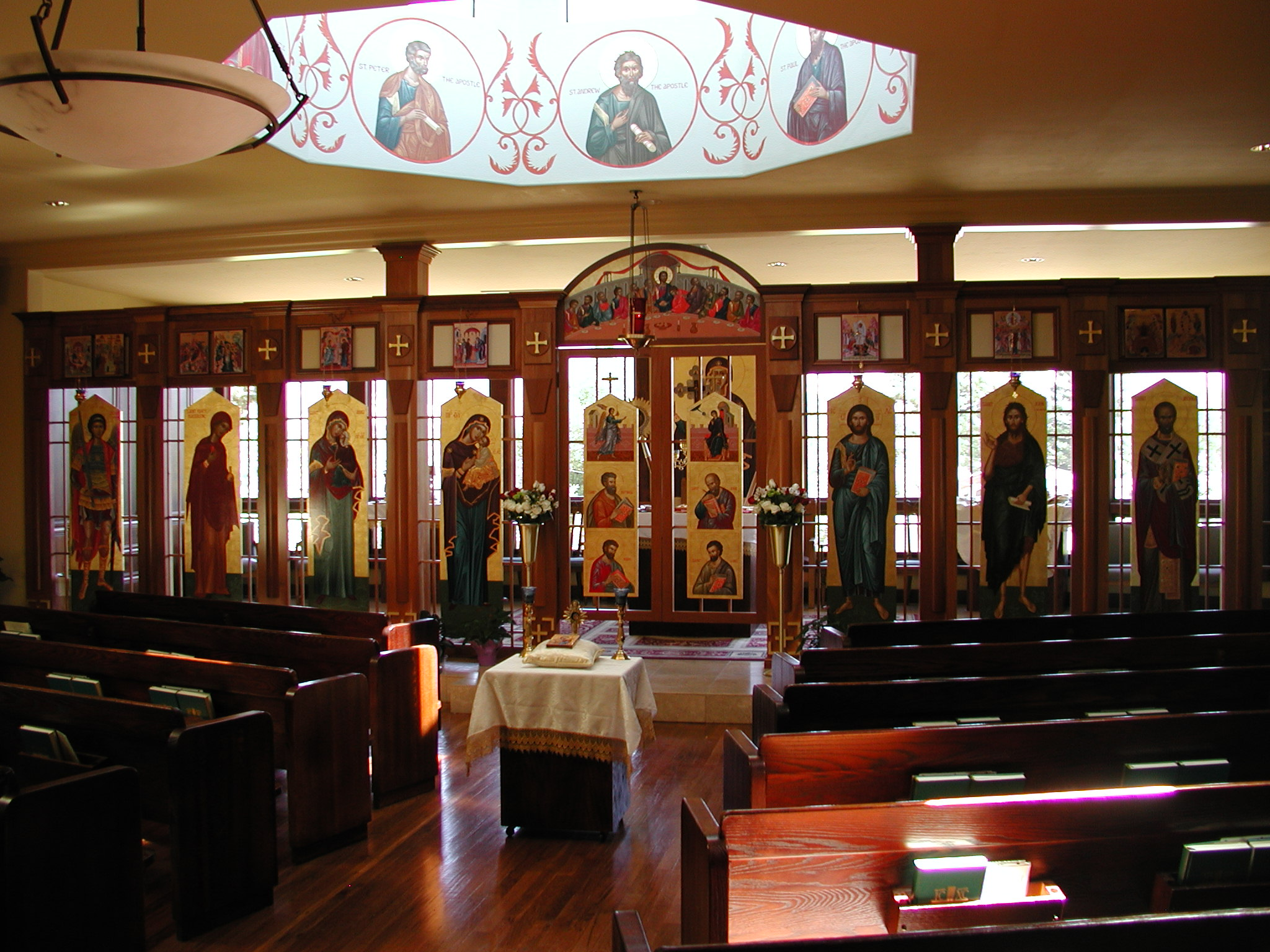
Saint Anne's church interior in 2013 after remodeling

== See also ==
- Byzantine Catholic Eparchy of Van Nuys
- Byzantine Catholic Archeparchy of Pittsburgh
- Category:Byzantine Catholic Metropolia of Pittsburgh
- Byzantine Rite
- Ruthenian Greek Catholic Church
