= Artur Bubnevych =

Ruthenian Catholic eparch-elect

His Grace, The Most Reverend Artur Olexandrovych Bubnevych
- Eparch of Phoenix
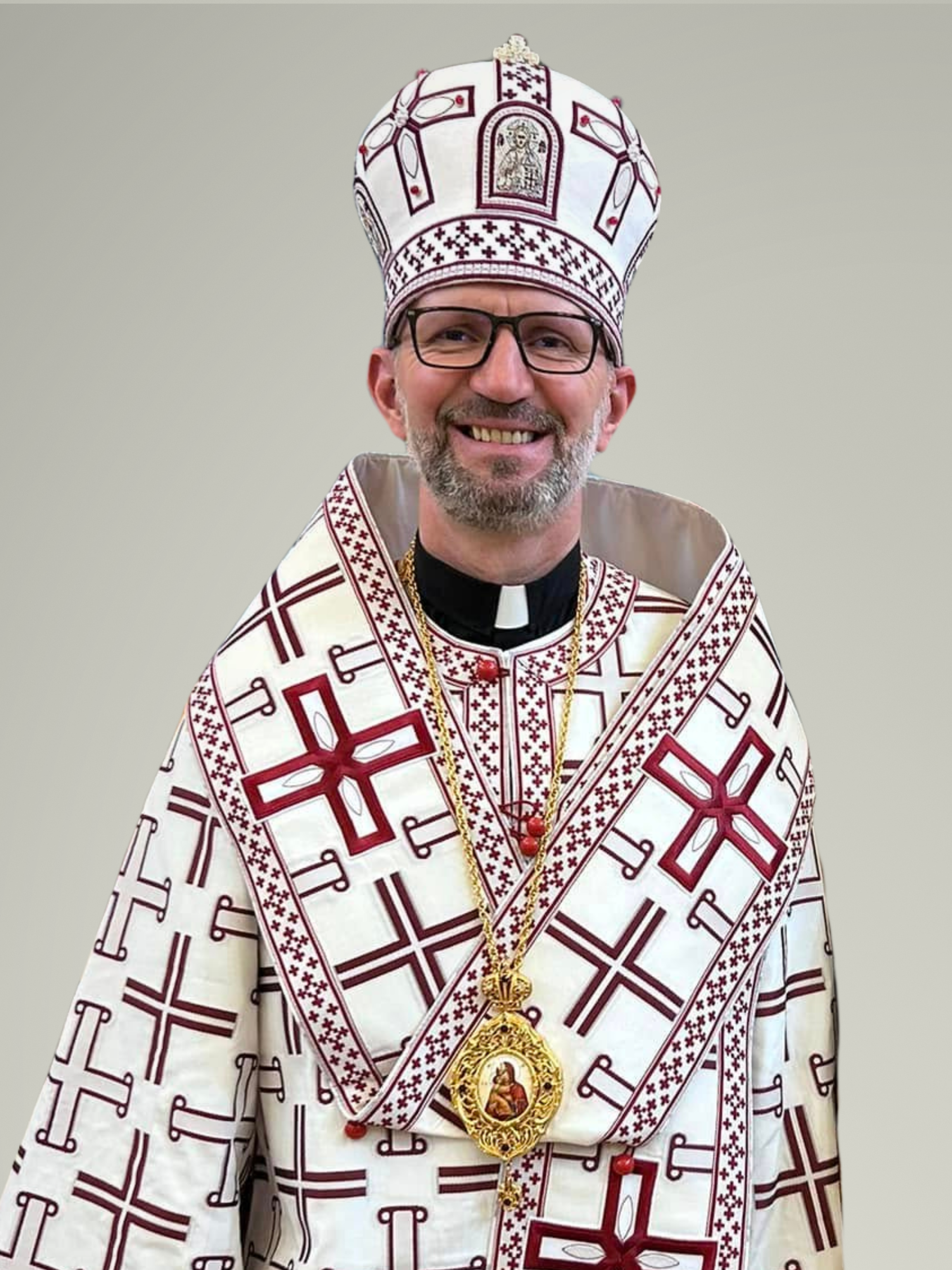
- Church: Ruthenian Greek Catholic Church
- Metropolis: Pittsburgh
- Diocese: Phoenix
- Appointed: 8 November 2024
- Installed: 28 January 2025
- Predecessor: John Stephen Pazak

Orders
- Ordination: 14 September 2014 by Gerald Nicholas Dino
- Consecration: 28 January 2025 by William C. Skurla, Kurt Burnette, and Robert Mark Pipta

Personal details
- Born: 22 June 1975 (age 51) Perechyn, Ukrainian SSR, Soviet Union
- Education: International Theological Institute

Styles of Artur Bubnevych
- Reference style: His Grace; The Most Reverend
- Spoken style: His Grace
- Religious style: Eparch

Artur Olexandrovych Bubnevych (born 22 June 1975) is a Ukrainian-American prelate of the Ruthenian Greek Catholic Church who has served as the Eparch of Phoenix since 2025.

== Biography ==
=== Early life ===
Bubnevych was born in Perechyn, Ukrainian SSR. He graduated from Uzhgorod Greek Catholic Seminary in 1998 and received the minor orders up to subdeacon the next year. Following this, he studied theology at the International Theological Institute in Gaming, Austria, where he earned a degree in 2001. Beginning in 2007, he worked with Milan Šašik at the Eparchy of Mukačevo, also ministering to youth and teaching English in the seminary. In 2013, he was invited to the United States by Gerald Dino to serve in a pastoral role. He was ordained to the diaconate on 9 March 2014 and to the priesthood on 14 September of the same year by Dino.

=== Priesthood ===
In January 2015, Bubnevych was named pastor of Our Lady of Perpetual Help Byzantine Catholic Church in Albuquerque, New Mexico, and oversaw significant growth in the population of that parish during the COVID-19 pandemic. He was also one of 5 priests from the United States who was selected to attend the Sixteenth Ordinary General Assembly of the Synod of Bishops.

He is a supporter of Ukraine in the Russo-Ukrainian War, stating that "It was always my prayer that life in Ukraine would become better and the Ukrainian state would become more Democratic and more pro-Western." His parents, who had lived in Ukraine until 2022, now live in Hungary as refugees.

=== Episcopacy ===
On 8 November 2024, Bubnevych was appointed eparch of the Ruthenian Catholic Eparchy of the Holy Protection of Mary of Phoenix, succeeding John Stephen Pazak. He was consecrated and enthroned on 28 January 2025 at Annunciation Byzantine Catholic Church in Anaheim. The principal consecrator was William C. Skurla, with Kurt Burnette and Robert Mark Pipta as principal co-consecrators.

== See also ==
- Catholic Church hierarchy
- Catholic Church in the United States
- Historical list of the Catholic bishops of the United States
- List of Catholic bishops of the United States
- Lists of patriarchs, archbishops, and bishops
