= Cathedral of the Nativity of the Mother of God (Toronto) =

Slovak Byzantine Catholic cathedral in Canada

Coordinates: 43°38′56″N 79°25′03″W

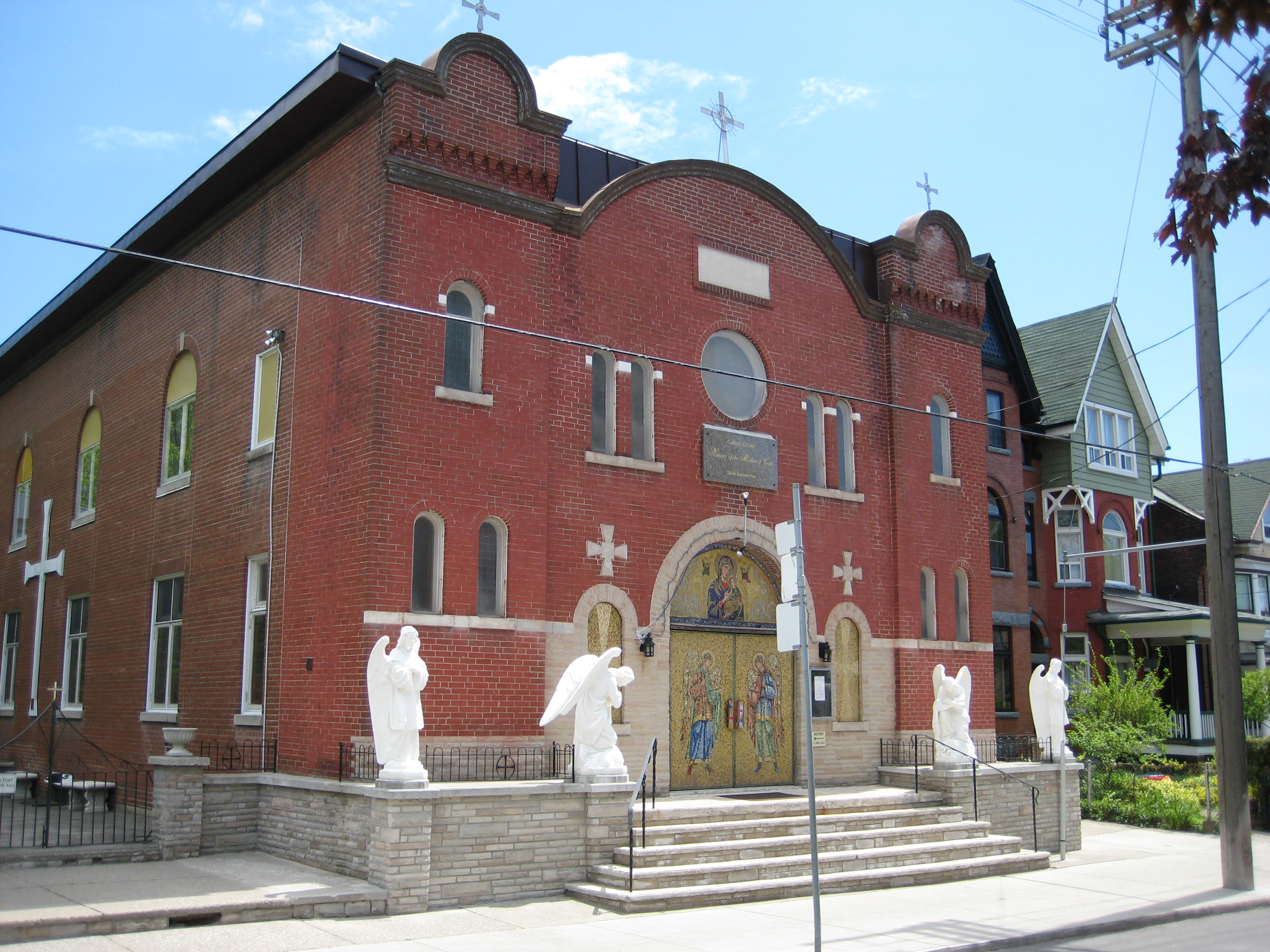
- Byzantine Slovak Cathedral of the Nativity of the Mother of God in 2010
- Cathedral of the Nativity of the Mother of God
- Location: 257 Shaw Street, Toronto, Ontario
- Denomination: Catholic
- Sui iuris church: Ruthenian Greek Catholic Church

Administration
- Diocese: Exarchate of Saints Cyril and Methodius of Toronto

The Cathedral of the Nativity of the Mother of God is the cathedral church of the Exarchate of Saints Cyril and Methodius of Toronto, located on Shaw Street in Toronto, Canada. Ministering to members of the Slovak Byzantine Catholic Church exarchate, it falls under the jurisdiction of the Ruthenian Greek Catholic Church.

== History ==
The Church of the Nativity of the Mother of God in Toronto for Slovaks of the Eastern Rite was established in October 1951. L. Minya was appointed the first pastor of the newly formed church.

In 1952, Michael Rusnak was appointed as a pastor of the church. It was during this time that the congregation acquired the B'Nai Israel Synagogue on Shaw Street in Toronto and converted it to a church.

In 2006, Bishop John Pazak moved the tabernacle and the antimension from the Cathedral of the Transfiguration in Markham to the Church of the Nativity of the Mother of God, elevating the church to a Cathedral.

In 2022, Pope Francis lowered the Eparchy of Saints Cyril and Methodius in Toronto to an exarchate and transferred it from the Slovak Greek Catholic Church to the Byzantine Catholic Metropolitan Church of Pittsburgh, a Ruthenian Greek Catholic ecclesiastical province. The cathedral, as part of the eparchy, was transferred the jurisdiction of Ruthenian Greek Catholic Church.

In 2024, fundraising for a renovation project began. One of the primary goals was the installation of an iconostasis, which the cathedral church had never had since being converted from a synagogue.

== See also ==
- Exarchate of Saints Cyril and Methodius of Toronto
