= Holy Protection of Mary Byzantine Catholic Eparchy of Phoenix =

Eastern Catholic eparchy in Western United States

Eparchy of Holy Protection of Mary Byzantine Catholic Eparchy of Phoenix Eparchia Sanctae Mariae a Patrocinio in urbe Phoenicensi
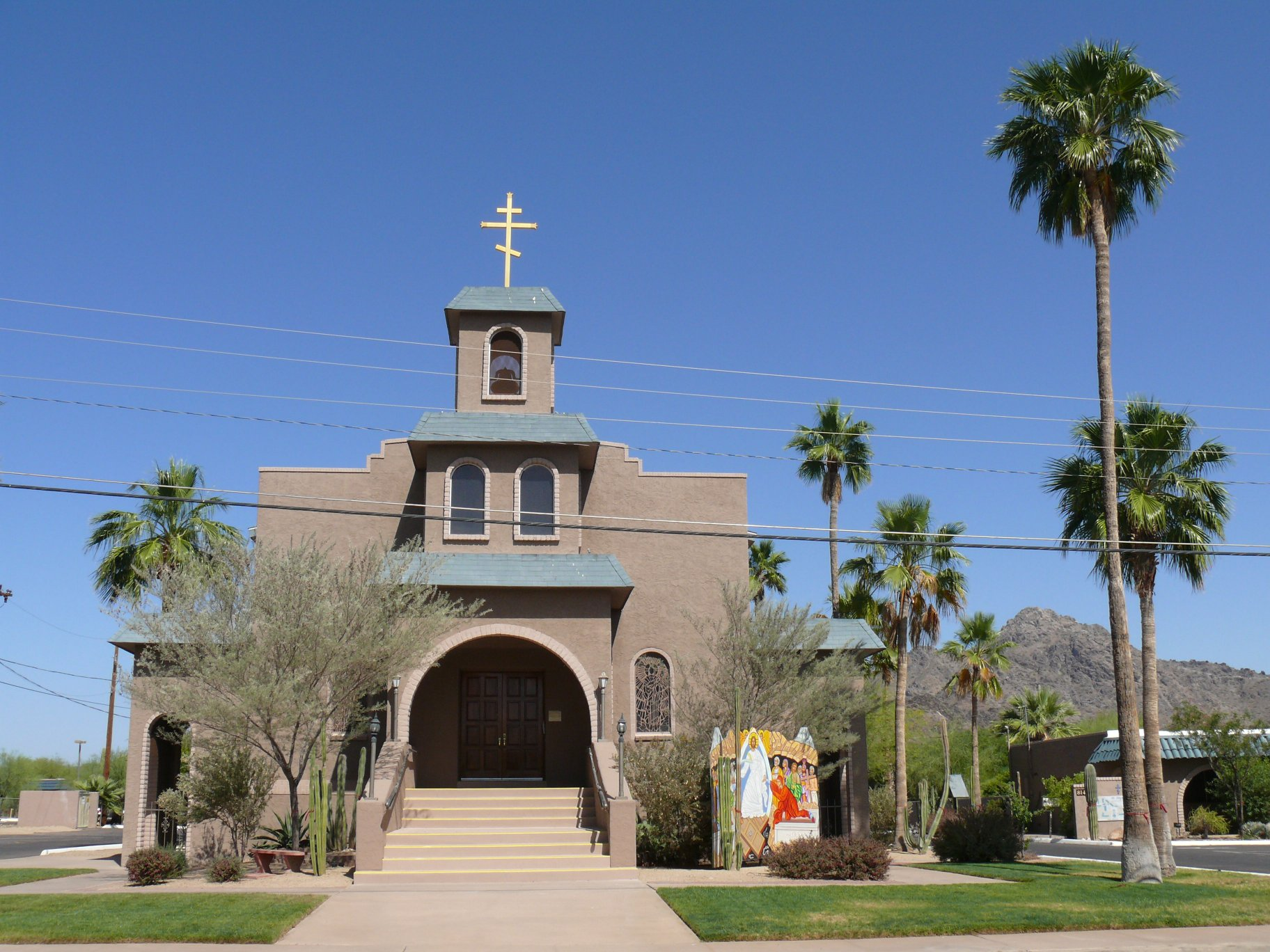
- Saint Stephen Cathedral in Phoenix

Location
- Country: United States
- Territory: Alaska, Arizona, California, Colorado, Nevada, New Mexico, Oregon, and Washington
- Ecclesiastical province: Pittsburgh
- Metropolitan: William C. Skurla

Statistics
- Population: (as of 2019); 2,261
- Parishes: 19

Information
- Denomination: Catholic Church
- Sui iuris church: Ruthenian Greek Catholic Church
- Rite: Byzantine Rite (Ruthenian and Russian recensions)
- Established: December 3, 1981 (44 years ago)
- Cathedral: St. Stephen Cathedral
- Co-cathedral: Proto-Cathedral of St. Mary
- Patron saint: Holy Protection of Mary

Current leadership
- Pope: Leo XIV
- Eparch: Artur Bubnevych
- Bishops emeritus: John Stephen Pazak

Map
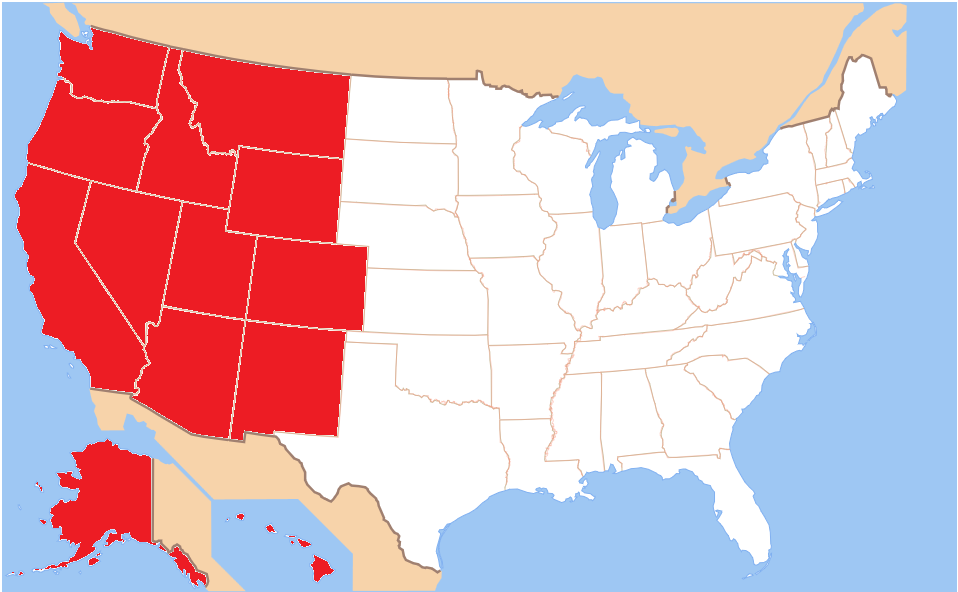

Website
- www.ephx.org

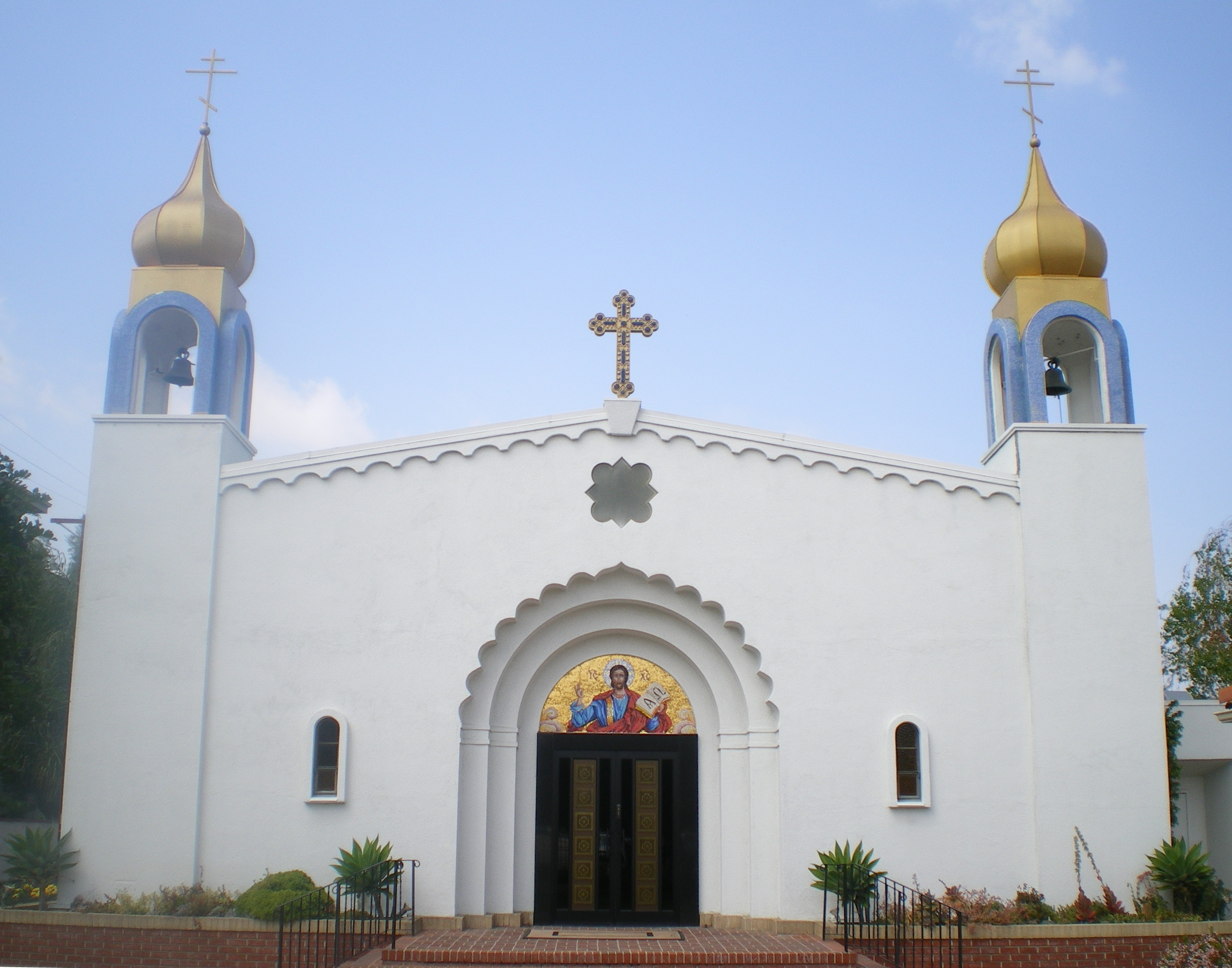
Proto-Cathedral of St. Mary in Van Nuys, California

The Holy Protection of Mary Byzantine Catholic Eparchy of Phoenix, commonly known as the Eparchy of Phoenix and formerly known as the Byzantine Catholic Eparchy of Van Nuys, (Latin: Eparchia Vannaisensis) is a Ruthenian Greek Catholic Church territory jurisdiction or eparchy of the Catholic Church in the western United States. Its episcopal see is Phoenix, Arizona. The eparch as of 28 January 2025 is Artur Bubnevych.

The Eparchy of Phoenix's territorial jurisdiction consists of thirteen western states. Churches are presently located in the states of Alaska, Arizona, California, Colorado, Nevada, New Mexico, Oregon, and Washington. It is a suffragan eparchy in the ecclesiastical province of the metropolitan Archeparchy of Pittsburgh. As of 2019, Holy Protection Eparchy of Phoenix has 19 parishes and 2 missions under its canonical jurisdiction. Most parishes follow the Ruthenian recension, although the eparchy includes one parish of the Italo-Albanian Catholic Church.

== History ==
The creation of a new eparchy for the western United States was proposed by the metropolitan Council of Hierarchs in 1981. The Congregation for the Oriental Churches, a dicastery of the Roman Curia responsible for the Eastern Catholic Churches in communion with the Holy See, recommended the erection of a new eparchy, and it was approved by Pope John Paul II.

The Eparchy of Van Nuys was canonically inaugurated on March 9, 1982, when Archbishop Stephen Kocisko, Metropolitan of the Metropolia of Pittsburgh enthroned Thomas Dolinay as the first bishop of the eparchy. Archbishop Pio Laghi, Apostolic Delegate to the United States, represented the Roman Pontiff and read the Papal Bulla creating the eparchy and appointing Dolinay. Cardinal Timothy Manning, Archbishop of Los Angeles delivered the homily. The Church of St. Mary in Sherman Oaks, California, was designated as the cathedral.

In 1990, with the retirement of Archbishop Kocisko of Pittsburgh approaching, Pope John Paul II relieved Dolinay of his duties as Bishop of Van Nuys and appointed him Coadjutor Archbishop of the Byzantine Catholic Archeparchy of Pittsburgh on February 19, 1990. The Pope appointed the Auxiliary Bishop of Passaic, George M. Kuzma, to succeed Bishop Dolinay.

After the Northridge earthquake of 1994 damaged the Cathedral of St. Mary, the eparchial offices, and the bishop's residence, Bishop Kuzma moved his office and residence to Phoenix, Arizona. On February 10, 2010, the seat of the diocese was officially changed to Phoenix. Accordingly, the former pro-cathedral of St. Stephen was given the title of Cathedral, and the Cathedral of St. Mary received the title of Proto-Cathedral.

== Eparchs ==
The eparchal headquarters are at 8105 North 16th Street, Phoenix, Arizona.

=== Ordinaries ===
1. Bishop Thomas Dolinay (1982–1990) †
2. Bishop George Kuzma (1991–2000) †
3. Bishop William C. Skurla (2002–2007)
4. Bishop Gerald N. Dino (2007–2016) †
5. Bishop John Stephen Pazak (2016–2021)
  1. Bishop Thomas Olmsted (Apostolic Administrator, 2018-2023; Apostolic Administrator Sede vacante as of August 1, 2018)
  2. Bishop Kurt Burnette (Apostolic Administrator, 2023–2025; Apostolic Administrator *Sede vacante as of January 23, 2023)
6. Artur Bubnevych (2025–present)

† = deceased

=== Other priests of this eparchy who became bishops ===
- Kurt Richard Burnette, appointed Bishop of Passaic (Ruthenian) in 2013
- Robert Mark Pipta, appointed Bishop of Parma (Ruthenian) in 2023

== Statistics ==
The eparchy has 19 parishes, 1 mission, 5 outreaches, and 2 shrines.

== See also ==
- Byzantine Catholic Metropolitan Church of Pittsburgh
- Byzantine Catholic Archeparchy of Pittsburgh
- Byzantine Catholic Eparchy of Parma
- Byzantine Catholic Eparchy of Passaic
- Byzantine Catholic Exarchate of Saints Cyril and Methodius of Toronto
- List of the Catholic bishops of the United States § Eastern Catholic eparchs

Parishes

- St. Stephen Byzantine Catholic Cathedral, the current cathedral
- Cathedral of St. Mary Byzantine Catholic Church, the former cathedral
- Saint Anne Byzantine Catholic Church
- St. Thomas The Apostle Byzantine Catholic Church

== Bibliography ==
- Byzantine Catholic Metropolia of Pittsburgh (1999). Byzantine-Ruthenian Metropolitan Church of Pittsburgh Directory. Pittsburgh: Byzantine Catholic Metropolitan Church of Pittsburgh. ISBN none.
- Magocsi, Paul Robert and Ivan Pop (2005). Encyclopedia of Rusyn History and Culture. Toronto: University of Toronto Press. ISBN 0-8020-3566-3.
