= Marián Andrej Pacák =

Canadian Slovak Greek Catholic hierarch

Marián Andrej Pacák, C.Ss.R.
- Apostolic visitator in North America Eparchial Bishop Emeritus of Slovak Catholic Eparchy of Saints Cyril and Methodius of Toronto
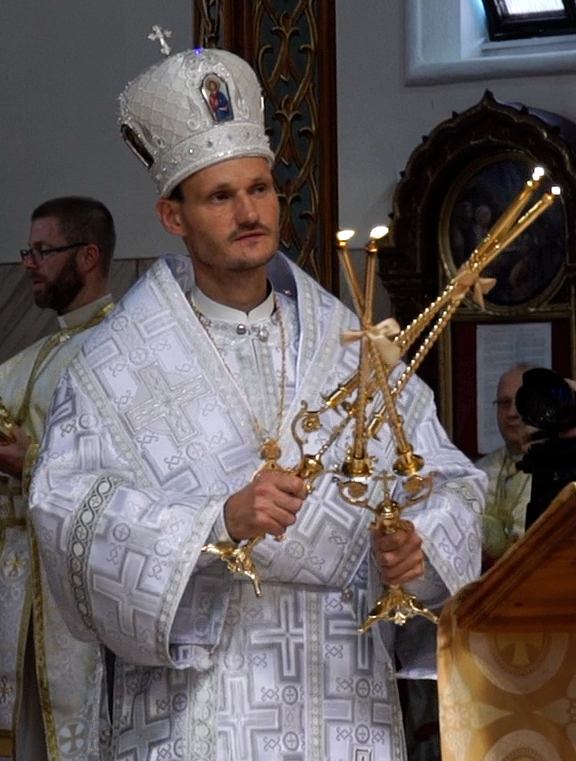
- Church: Slovak Greek Catholic Church
- Appointed: 5 July 2018
- Term ended: 20 October 2020
- Predecessor: John Stephen Pazak
- Successor: Kurt Burnette (Apostolic Administrator)

Orders
- Ordination: 12 July 1998 (Priest) by Milan Chautur
- Consecration: 2 September 2018 (Bishop) by Ján Babjak

Personal details
- Born: Marián Andrej Pacák; 24 April 1973 (age 53) Levoča, Czechoslovakia (present day Slovakia)
- Education: Alphonsian Academy
- Coat of arms

Bishop Marián Andrej Pacák, C.Ss.R. (born 24 April 1973) is a Canadian Slovak Greek Catholic hierarch, who serves as aposotolic visitator in North America of the Slovakia byzantine catholic church, he also served as the third Eparchial Bishop of the Slovak Catholic Eparchy of Saints Cyril and Methodius of Toronto from 5 July 2018 until his resignation on 20 October 2020.

== Life ==
Pacák was born in a Greek-Catholic family in the Prešov Region of the Eastern Slovakia. After his graduation from high-school, he joined the Congregation of the Most Holy Redeemer on 16 August 1991.

Pacák made his solemn profession as a Redemptorist on 16 August 1997. After completing his studies in philosophy and theology at the Major Redemptorists Theological Seminary in Tuchów, Poland, and at the Pontifical Theological Academy in Kraków, Poland, he was ordained a priest on 16 August 1997.

After ordination Pacák served as a parish priest in Stará Ľubovňa (1998–2001, 2008–2015) and in Michalovce (2004–2008). During 2001–2004 he interrupted his pastoral work to study at the Alphonsian Academy in Rome where he earned a licentiate in moral theology. From 2015 to 2018 he served at the parish in Vranov nad Topľou.

On 5 July 2018, Pacák was appointed the Eparchial Bishop of the Slovak Catholic Eparchy of Saints Cyril and Methodius of Toronto by Pope Francis. His episcopal consecration took place in the Basilica of the Descent of the Holy Spirit in Michalovce, Slovakia, on 2 September 2018, and he was installed in Toronto on 15 September.

Pope Francis accepted Pacák's resignation on 20 October 2020. Bishop emeritus returned to Slovakia and is residing in the Redemptorist community in Stará Ľubovňa.

Catholic Church titles
Preceded by John Stephen Pazak	Eparch of Sts. Cyril and Methodius of Toronto for the Slovaks; 2018–2020	Succeeded by Kurt Burnette (as Apostolic Administrator)
