= Cathedral of St. John the Baptist (Parma, Ohio) =

Ruthenian Greek Catholic cathedral in the US

- Cathedral of St. John the Baptist
- 41°24′44″N 81°43′25″W
- Location: 5500 W. 54th St. Parma, Ohio
- Country: United States
- Denomination: Catholic Church
- Sui iuris church: Ruthenian Greek Catholic Church
- Website: www.parma.org/cathedral

History
- Founded: 1898

Architecture
- Style: Modern
- Completed: 1969

Administration
- Diocese: Eparchy of Parma

Clergy
- Bishop: Robert Mark Pipta
- Rector: Rev. Fr. Michael Lee

The Cathedral of St. John the Baptist is the cathedral church of the Eparchy of Parma in the Ruthenian Greek Catholic Church. It is located in Parma, Ohio, United States.

== History ==
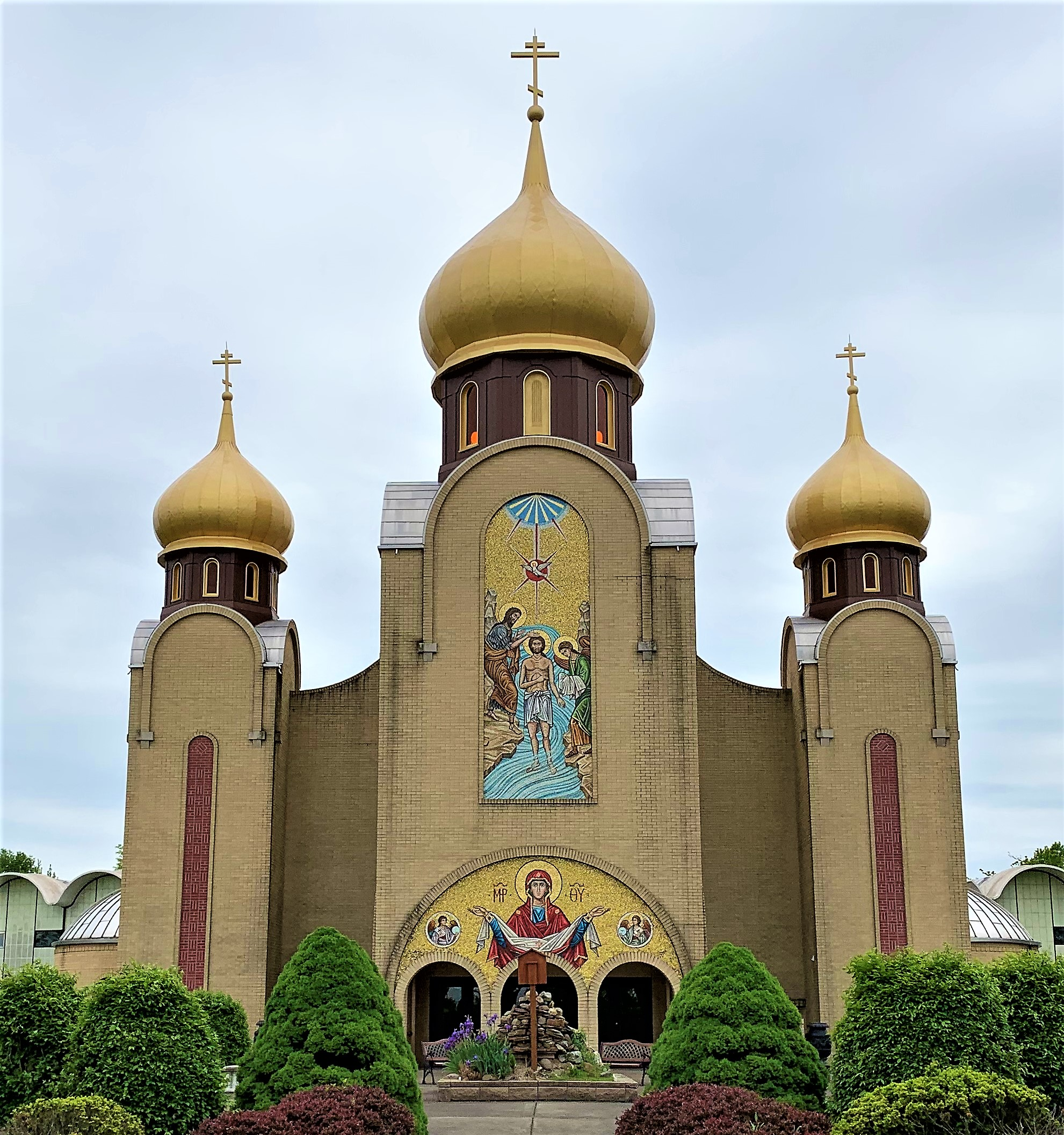
The former Cathedral of St. John the Baptist on Snow Road.

St. John's parish was founded in 1898 with Father Peter Keselak as its first pastor. Divine Services were initially celebrated in St. Joseph's Chapel at East 23rd and Woodland Avenue in Cleveland. A hall was then rented on East 22nd and Woodland. As the congregation continued to grow they purchased a church and parish house at East 22nd and Scovill Avenue (now East 22nd and Tri-C Way) in August 1901. When Father Stefan Makar was pastor a triple-domed church was built in 1913 on the site of the old church. The parish continued to use that facility until the property was bought by the State of Ohio for a new interstate and a new church was built in 1960 on the parish picnic grounds in Parma. The old church was torn down the following year. An elementary school was built and a convent was purchased in 1962. The Eparchy of Parma was established in 1969 and St. John's Church became the cathedral.

On March 5, 2021, Bishop Milan Lach decreed that St. John's parish would merge with Holy Spirit parish in Parma and Dormition of the Mother of God Parish (St. Mary's) in Cleveland. The decree of merger was quickly reversed by the Congregation for the Eastern Churches. Bishop Lach emended the decree merging the three parishes and republished it on March 29, 2021. The merged parish utilizes the facilities of the Dormition of the Mother of God in Cleveland and retains that name.

Bishop Robert Pipta decreed the transfer of the Cathedral church of St. John the Baptist to Holy Spirit Church in Parma on October 7, 2024. This decree affirmed the merger of the three parishes in 2021 and transferred the cathedral and its name to Holy Spirit Church. The eparchial offices were transferred to the same location. On the same day, Bishop Pipta deconsecrated the former St. John the Baptist church on Snow Road to non-sacred but not sordid use. Plans were announced to renovate the former Holy Spirit Church, which was built in 1969 in the modernist style. The proposed renovation to the exterior adds multiple domes and reflects the Hutzul architectural style of the Ruthenian Byzantine Catholic Church found in Central and Eastern Europe.

== See also ==
- List of Catholic cathedrals in the United States
- List of cathedrals in the United States
