= John Michael Kudrick =

His Grace, The Most Reverend John Michael Kudrick
- Eparch Emeritus of Parma for the Byzantines
- Church: Ruthenian Greek Catholic Church
- Diocese: Ruthenian Catholic Eparchy of Parma
- Appointed: May 3, 2002
- Installed: July 10, 2002
- Retired: May 7, 2016
- Predecessor: Basil Myron Schott
- Successor: Milan Lach

Orders
- Ordination: May 3, 1975 by Adrian Veigle, TOR
- Consecration: July 10, 2002 by Basil Schott, Andrew Pataki and William C. Skurla

Personal details
- Born: John Michael Kudrick; December 23, 1947 (age 78) Lloydell, Pennsylvania, U.S.
- Parents: George and Amelia Kudrick deceased
- Education: Saint Francis College, St. Francis Seminary, Indiana University of Pennsylvania, Ohio State University
- Motto: Behold the Lamb of God

Styles of John Michael Kudrick
- Reference style: His Grace; The Most Reverend
- Spoken style: His Grace
- Religious style: Eparch

John Michael Kudrick (born December 23, 1947) is an American Eastern Catholic hierarch and, since the acceptance of his resignation by Pope Francis on Saturday, May 7, 2016, the Bishop Emeritus of Parma for the Byzantines.

== Early life ==
The son of George and Amelia Kudrick, John Kudrick was born in Lloydell, Pennsylvania in 1947.

== Education ==
He graduated as valedictorian of his class from Adams-Summerhill High School. Joining the Third Order Regular of St. Francis on January 29, 1967, Kudrick studied at Saint Francis College in Loretto, Pennsylvania, graduating with a bachelor of arts in philosophy and in mathematics in 1970. Kudrick continued his studies for the priesthood at St. Francis Seminary, also in Loretto, from which he received a master of divinity degree in 1975. He also received a master of science degree in mathematics in 1973 from Indiana University of Pennsylvania as well as a master of science degree in computer and information science from Ohio State University in 1977.

== Work ==
Kudrick was ordained a priest on May 3, 1975, staying on at Saint Francis College as a member of the mathematics and computer science faculty. In 1978, he was named director of the university's computer services. He was director of postulants for the Order from 1976 until 1980. Kudrick assisted at parishes of the Byzantine Catholic Archeparchy of Pittsburgh during his time as a Franciscan friar, and eventually petitioned for incardination into the archeparchy, which he received in May 1987. He served at several parishes as a priest under Archbishop Judson Procyk, and his last assignment was as proto-presbyter of the Cathedral of St. John in Munhall from 1998 until 2002.

When Procyk died on April 13, 2001, Kudrick was elected administrator of the vacant Archeparchy of Pittsburgh on April 24, 2001. He served as administrator of the Archeparchy of Pittsburgh until the installation of the new Archeparch, Metropolitan Basil Schott, on July 9, 2002. Kudrick was consecrated a Bishop by him a day later on July 10, 2002.

== See also ==
- Catholic Church hierarchy
- Catholic Church in the United States
- Historical list of the Catholic bishops of the United States
- List of Catholic bishops of the United States
- Lists of patriarchs, archbishops, and bishops

== Episcopal succession ==
Catholic Church titles
Preceded by Basil M. Schott	Eparch of Parma for the Byzantines; 2002–2016	Succeeded by Milan Lach
