= Munhall =

Munhall may refer to:

- Munhall, Pennsylvania, a borough in Allegheny County, Pennsylvania
- the former Ruthenian Catholic Archeparchy of Munhall, a US Byzantine Rite Metropolitanate, meanwhile renamed as -Ruthenian Catholic Archeparchy of Pittsburgh
