= Exarchate of Saints Cyril and Methodius of Toronto =

Eastern Catholic ecclesiastical jurisdiction in Canada

Exarchate of Saints Cyril and Methodius of Toronto Exarchát svätých Cyrila a Metoda byzantského obradu v Toronte Exarchatus Sanctorum Cyrilli et Methodii Torontini ritus Byzantini
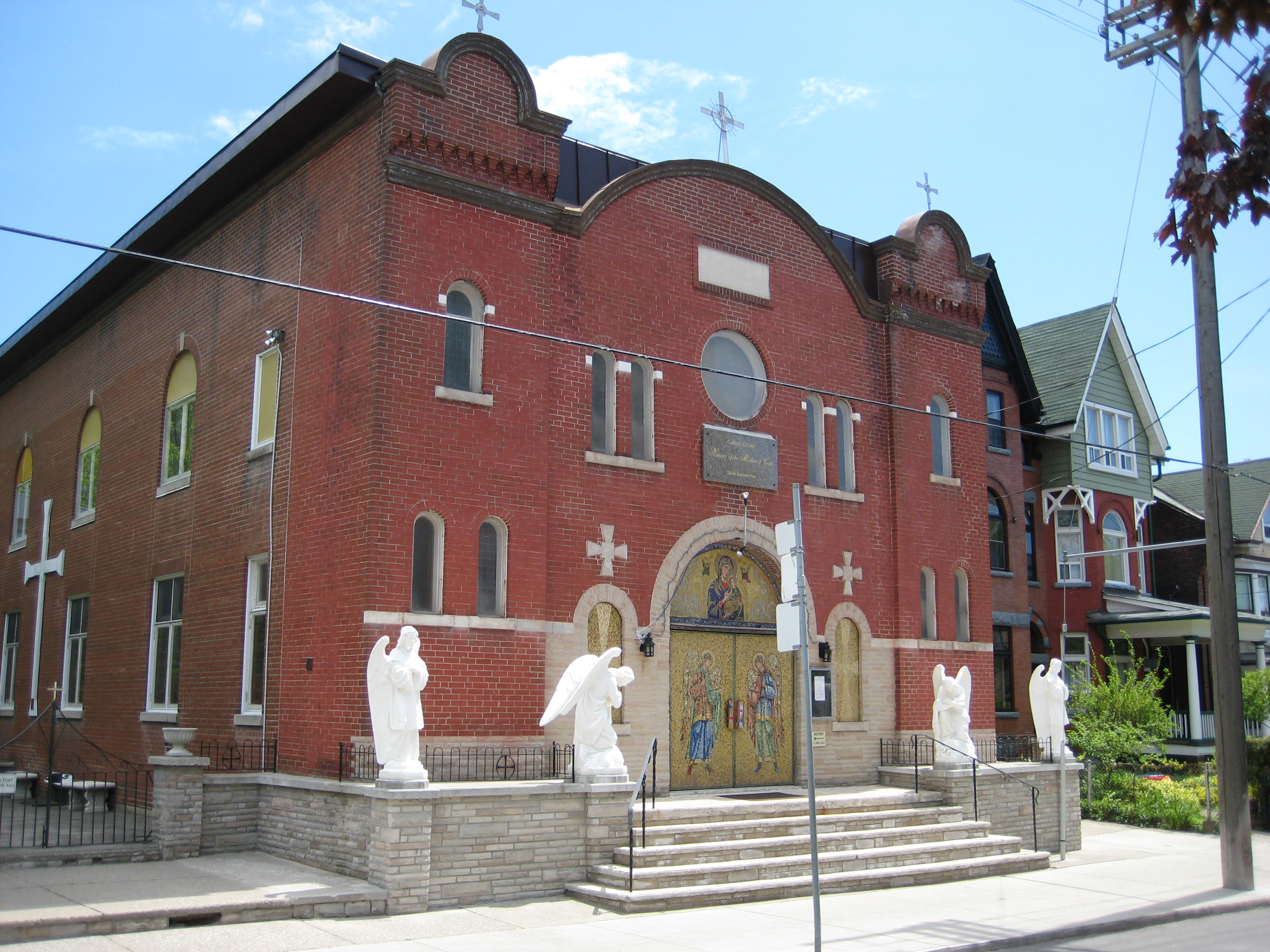
- Cathedral of the Nativity of the Mother of God, Toronto

Location
- Country: Canada
- Ecclesiastical province: Metropolis of Pittsburgh

Statistics
- Population: (as of 2013); 4,800
- Parishes: 4

Information
- Denomination: Catholic Church
- Sui iuris church: Ruthenian Greek Catholic Church (Slovak Greek Catholic Church until 2022)
- Rite: Byzantine Rite
- Established: 13 October 1980
- Cathedral: Cathedral of the Nativity of the Mother of God

Current leadership
- Pope: Leo XIV
- Apostolic administrator: Kurt Richard Burnette
- Bishops emeritus: Marián Andrej Pacák

The Exarchate of Saints Cyril and Methodius of Toronto (Latin: Exarchatus Sanctorum Cyrilli et Methodii Torontini ritus Byzantini, Slovak: Exarchát svätých Cyrila a Metoda byzantského obradu v Toronte) is a ecclesiastical territory or exarchate that serves the Slovak Greek Catholic Church — a sui juris or self governing Eastern Catholic Church. Its geographical remit includes the whole territory of Canada. In 2022, Pope Francis transferred the ecclesiastical jurisdiction of the exarchate from the Slovak Greek Catholic Church to the Ruthenian Greek Catholic Church. It became part of the ecclesiastical Metropolis of Pittsburgh. This changed the territory's status from an eparchy to an exarchate at the same time.

== History ==
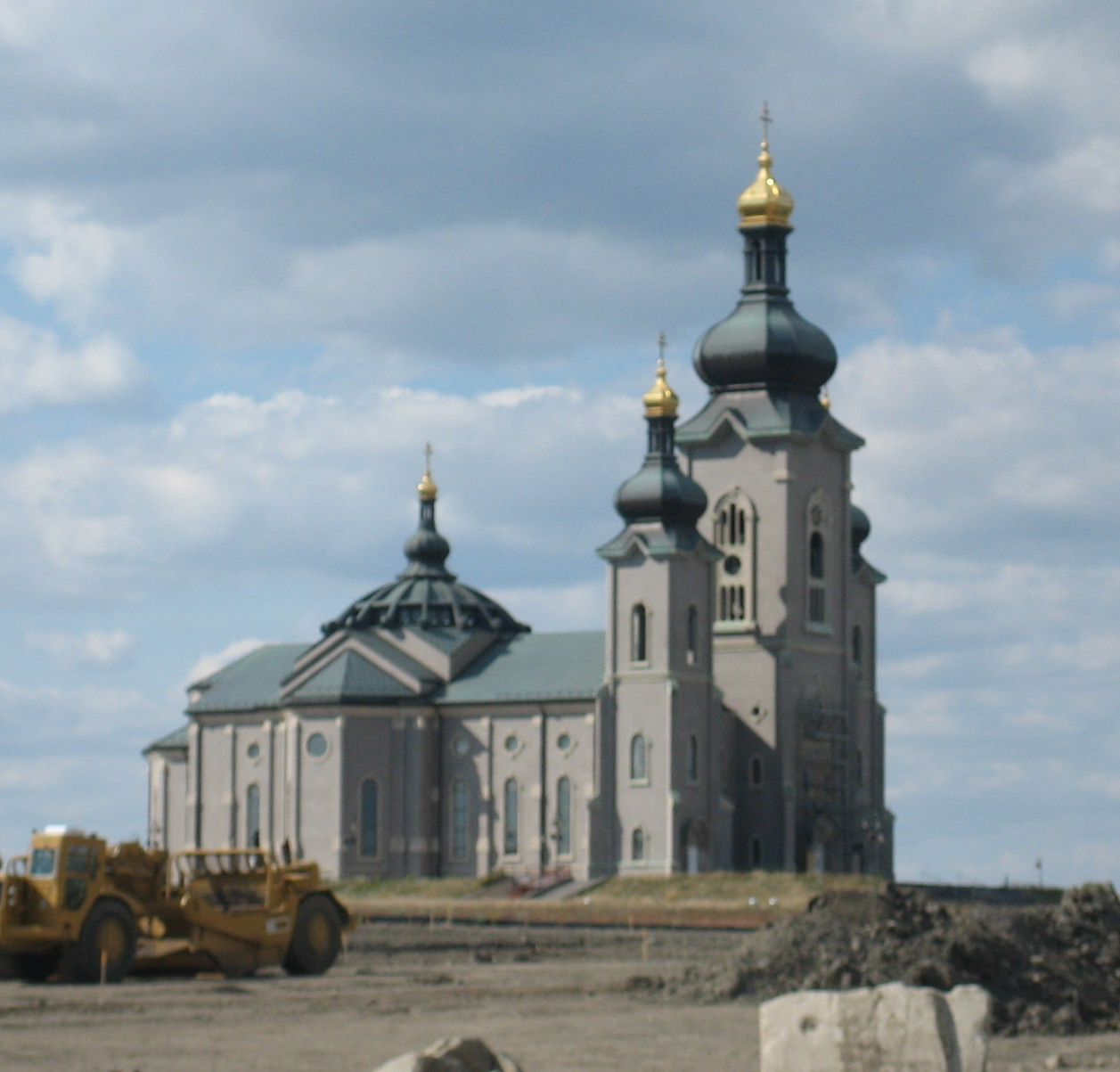
Church of the Transfiguration of our Lord in Markham, former cathedral church of the eparchy

Since the end of the 19th century, several Eastern Catholic ethnic groups, including Slavs of the Byzantine Rite, started to arrive in Canada. Among them, there were Byzantine Catholics from Slovakia, who came under jurisdiction of common exarchates, and later eparchies, that were initially created for all Byzantine Catholics in Canada. Since those jurisdictions were subsequently redefined as "Ukrainian," other groups, including Slovak Greek Catholics, wanted to have their own episcopal ordinary. In 1964, Michael Rusnak was appointed as auxiliary bishop, with jurisdiction over Slovak parishes, and that solution was also welcomed by the Rusyn community in Canada.

The eparchy was erected on 13 October 1980 by Pope John Paul II. Its patron saints are Saints Cyril and Methodius. The former cathedral church of the eparchy was Cathedral of the Transfiguration in Markham, Ontario.

The eparch was Michael Rusnak, C.SS.R. (from 13 October 1980 to 11 November 1996). The eparchy was sede vacante for more than two years, because on 7 May 2016, Pope Francis transferred Eparch John Stephen Pazak, who had been in office since December 2000 as bishop (eparch) of the Eparchy of Holy Mary of Protection of Phoenix of the Ruthenians, in Phoenix, Arizona, to serve as apostolic administrator of the Eparchy of Saints Cyril and Methodius of Toronto until the appointment of a new eparch. On 5 July 2018, Fr. Marián Andrej Pacák, C.SS.R. was named the bishop of the eparchy. On 20 October 2020, Pope Francis accepted his resignation and named Kurt Richard Burnette as apostolic administrator.

As of 2016 the Cathedral of the Nativity of the Mother of God in Toronto was the cathedral church.

Upon establishing the territory as an exarchate under the Archeparchy of Pittsburgh in March 2022, Pope Francis reappointed Eparch Kurt Burnette as Apostolic Administrator sede vacante et ad nutum Sanctae Sedis of the Exarchate.

== Ordinaries ==
As part of the Slovak Greek Catholic Church

- Eparch Michael Rusnak, C.SS.R. (13 October 1980 – 11 November 1996)
  - Fr. John Fetsco, C.SS.R. – apostolic administrator (22 November 1996 – 2 December 2000)
- Eparch John Stephen Pazak, C.Ss.R. (2 December 2000 – 7 May 2016)
  - Eparch John Stephen Pazak, C.Ss.R. – apostolic administrator (7 May 2016 – 5 July 2018); appointed bishop of Holy Protection of Mary of Phoenix (Ruthenian), Arizona, US
- Eparch Marián Andrej Pacák, C.Ss.R. (5 July 2018 - 20 October 2020)
  - Eparch Kurt Richard Burnette – apostolic administrator (20 October 2020 - 3 March 2022

As part of the Ruthenian Greek Catholic Church

- Sede vacante
  - Eparch Kurt Richard Burnette - apostolic administrator sede vacante et ad nutum Sanctae Sedis 3 March 2022 - Present

== See also ==
- Byzantine Catholic Metropolitan Church of Pittsburgh
- Byzantine Catholic Archeparchy of Pittsburgh
- Byzantine Catholic Eparchy of Parma
- Byzantine Catholic Eparchy of Passaic
- Byzantine Catholic Eparchy of Phoenix

== Sources ==
- Magocsi, Paul R. (1999). Of the Making of Nationalities There is No End. Vol. 1. Boulder: East European Monographs. ISBN 9780880334389.
- Magocsi, Paul R. (2005) [1984]. Our People: Carpatho-Rusyns and their Descendants in North America (4. rev. ed.). Wauconda: Bolchazy-Carducci Publishers. ISBN 9780865166110.
