= John Stephen Pazak =

His Grace, The Most Reverend John Stephen Pazak, C.Ss.R.
- Eparch Emeritus of Phoenix for the Ruthenians
- Church: Ruthenian Greek Catholic Church
- Metropolis: Pittsburgh
- Diocese: Phoenix
- Appointed: May 7, 2016
- Installed: July 20, 2016
- Retired: August 23, 2021
- Predecessor: Gerald Nicholas Dino
- Successor: Artur Bubnevych
- Previous posts: Eparch of Slovak Catholic Eparchy of Saints Cyril and Methodius of Toronto (2001-2016); Rector of Saint Vladimir's College (1973-1990)

Orders
- Ordination: August 27, 1972 by Emil John Mihalik
- Consecration: February 14, 2001 by Michael Bzdel, C.Ss.R., Milan Chautur and Basil Schott

Personal details
- Born: August 13, 1946 (age 80) Gary, Indiana, United States
- Parents: Stephen Pazak & Johanna Hennessy
- Education: Saint Paul University
- Motto: Prepare the way of the Lord

Styles of John Stephen Pazak
- Reference style: His Grace; The Most Reverend
- Spoken style: His Grace
- Religious style: Eparch

John Stephen Pazak, C.Ss.R. (born August 13, 1946) is an American-born Eastern Catholic hierarch, who served as an eparch of the Ruthenian Greek Catholic Church. He served as the Eparch of the Eparchy of Phoenix, which is based in Phoenix, Arizona from July 2016 until his retirement in 2021. He is member of the Congregation of the Most Holy Redeemer, commonly known as the Redemptorists.

== Life ==
=== Family ===
Pazak was born in Gary, Indiana, on August 13, 1946, to Stephen Pazak, an American of Ruthenian descent, and Johanna Hennessy, who was of Irish descent, both members of the Ruthenian Greek Catholic Church.

=== Religious life ===
Pazak was admitted to the novitiate of the Canadian Province of the Redemptorists at Yorkton, Saskatchewan, on September 14, 1965. He studied at the Redemptorist seminary, St. Alphonsus College, in Suffield, Connecticut, and earned a bachelor's degree there in 1969. He made his perpetual profession of religious vows as a member of the Congregation on August 24 of that same year. After completing a baccalaureate in theology at Saint Paul University in Ottawa, he was ordained a priest on August 27, 1972.

After serving in a Saskatoon parish for a year, Pazak was appointed Rector of Saint Vladimir's College in Manitoba, and continued in this position until 1990, except during 1978–1979, when he served as superior at the Redemptorist scholasticate in Toronto. From 1990 1996, he was pastor at Ss. Peter and Paul Ukrainian Catholic Church in Saskatoon, then from 1996 to 2000 he was parish priest at St. Joseph Church in Winnipeg.

Pazak also served as vicar of his Redemptorist province, as a member of the provincial council, and as a consultor to the Ukrainian Catholic Eparchy of Saskatoon.

=== Eparchial appointments ===
Pope John Paul II appointed Pazak eparch of the Slovak Catholic Eparchy of Saints Cyril and Methodius of Toronto on December 2, 2000. The Ukrainian Catholic Archbishop of Winnipeg, Michael Bzdel, C.Ss.R., consecrated him a bishop on February 14, 2001; the co-consecrators were Milan Chautur, C.Ss.R., Apostolic Exarch of Košice and Basil Schott, O.F.M., the Ruthenian Eparch of Parma.

Pope Francis named Pazak the Eparch of the Ruthenian Catholic Eparchy of the Holy Protection of Mary in Phoenix on May 7, 2016. On the same day he was appointed Apostolic Administrator of the Eparchy of Saints Cyril and Methodius of Toronto, until the appointment of a successor. He was enthroned as Eparch of Phoenix for the Ruthenians on July 20, 2016. On August 23, 2021, Pope Francis accepted his resignation after reaching the age of 75.

== See also ==
- Catholic Church hierarchy
- Catholic Church in the United States
- Historical list of the Catholic bishops of the United States
- List of Catholic bishops of the United States
- Lists of patriarchs, archbishops, and bishops

== Episcopal succession ==
Catholic Church titles
Preceded by Gerald Nicholas Dino	Eparchy of Phoenix; 2016–2021	Succeeded by Artur Bubnevych
Preceded by Michael Rusnak	Eparch of Sts. Cyril and Methodius of Toronto for the Slovaks; 2001–2016	Succeeded by Marián Andrej Pacák
