= St. Michael Byzantine Catholic Church Toledo =

Coordinates: 41.403883°N 81.692668°W

St. Michael Byzantine Church
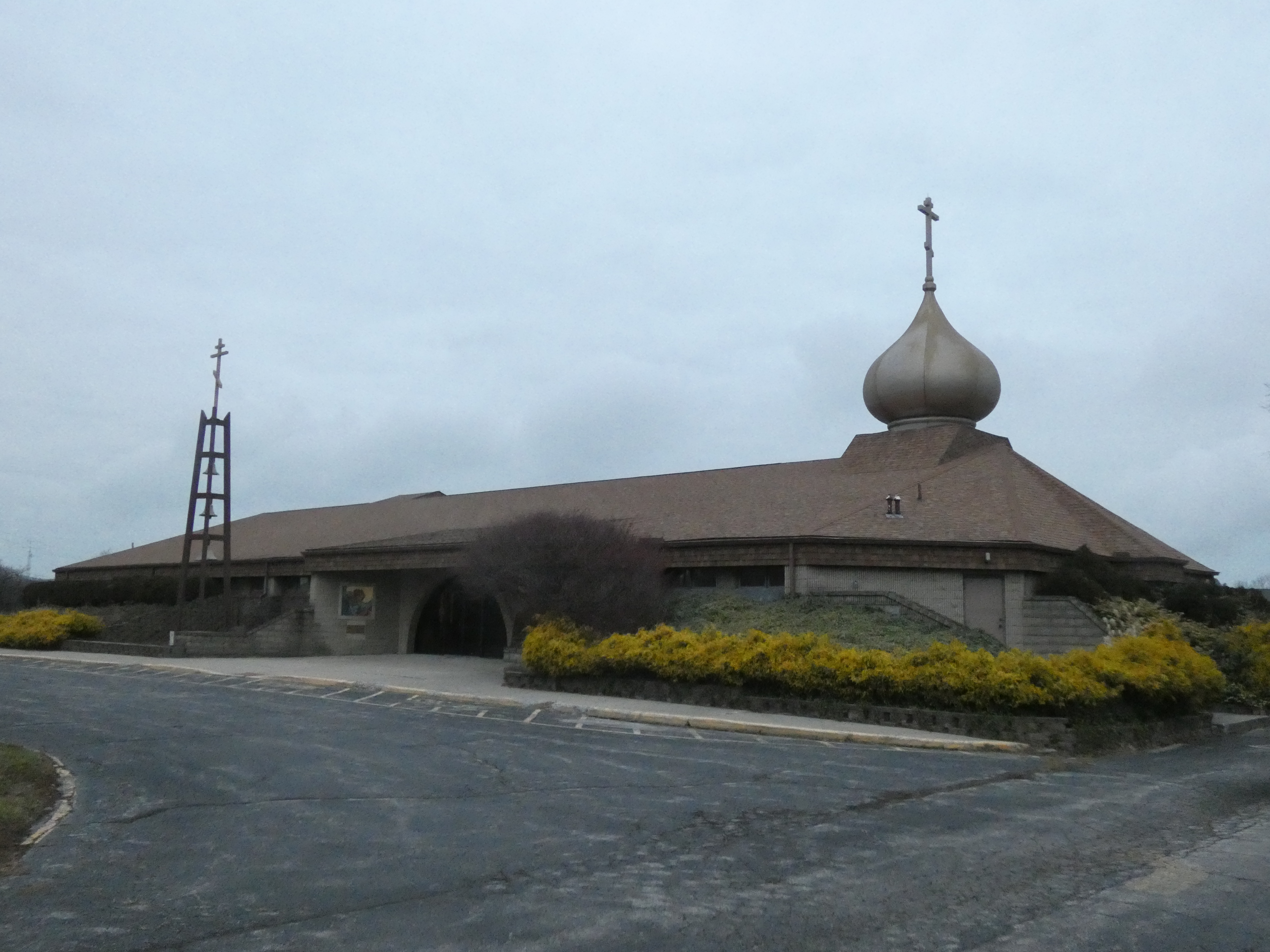
- Front portion of the church
- St. Michael Byzantine Church
- Location: Oregon, Ohio
- Country: United States
- Denomination: Eastern Catholic

Clergy
- Pastor: Andriy Kovach

St. Michael parish is a Ruthenian Greek Catholic Church, which uses the Divine Liturgy of the Byzantine Rite. Accordingly, St. Michael is in full communion with the Bishop of Rome (more commonly referred to as the Pope of Rome) and is a parish within the Byzantine Catholic Eparchy of Parma.
