= Kurt Burnette =

American Byzantine Catholic bishop

His Grace, The Most Reverend Kurt Richard Burnette
- Eparch of Passaic
- Coat of arms with motto Psalm 150:3a
- Church: Ruthenian Greek Catholic Church
- Metropolis: Pittsburgh
- Diocese: Passaic
- Appointed: 29 October 2013
- Installed: 4 December 2013
- Predecessor: William Charles Skurla
- Other posts: Apostolic Administrator, Eparchy of the Holy Protection of Mary of Phoenix; Apostolic Administrator, Eparchy of Parma; Apostolic Administrator, Exarchate of Saints Cyril and Methodius of Toronto
- Previous posts: Rector of the Byzantine Catholic Seminary of SS. Cyril and Methodius (2012-2013); Pastor of Our Lady of Perpetual Help Byzantine Catholic Church, (2008-2013)

Orders
- Ordination: 26 April 1989 by John Bilock
- Consecration: 4 December 2013 by William C. Skurla, John Michael Kudrick and Gerald Nicholas Dino

Personal details
- Born: Kurt Richard Burnette; 7 November 1955 (age 70) Fakenham, Norfolk, England, UK
- Denomination: Ruthenian Greek Catholic Church
- Profession: Professor of Mathematics
- Education: J.D., Ph.D., J.C.L.
- Alma mater: Rice University, University of Utah, Pontifical Oriental Institute

Styles of Kurt Richard Burnette
- Reference style: His Grace; The Most Reverend
- Spoken style: His Grace
- Religious style: Eparch

Kurt Richard Burnette (born 7 November 1955) is an American Catholic prelate who serves as the Eparch of Passaic in the Ruthenian Greek Catholic Church. He succeeded Bishop William C. Skurla. Burnette was appointed on October 29, 2013, by Pope Francis, and enthroned in a Divine Liturgy at the Cathedral of St. Michael the Archangel in Passaic, New Jersey on December 4.

On 20 October 2020, Pope Francis named Burnette as apostolic administrator of the former Slovak Catholic Eparchy of Saints Cyril and Methodius of Toronto. On 3 March, 2022, Pope Francis changed the jurisdiction and circumscription of the eparchy to establish the Exarchate of Saints Cyril and Methodius of Toronto. Burnette was appointed apostolic administrator of this new exarchate.

In January 23, 2023, Burnette was appointed as apostolic administrator of both the Eparchy of Parma and the Eparchy of Phoenix. These appointments, noted as being temporary, made Burnette the leader of over half of the Ruthenian Byzantine Catholic eparchies worldwide, until the appointment of Robert Mark Pipta as eparch of Parma.

== See also ==
- Catholic Church hierarchy
- Catholic Church in the United States
- Historical list of the Catholic bishops of the United States
- List of Catholic bishops of the United States
- Lists of patriarchs, archbishops, and bishops

== Episcopal succession ==
Catholic Church titles
Preceded by William Charles Skurla	Eparch of Passaic; 2013-Present	Succeeded by Incumbent
