= Michael Rusnak =

His Grace Michael Rusnak, C.Ss.R.
- Eparch of Slovak Catholic Eparchy of Saints Cyril and Methodius of Toronto
- Church: Slovak Greek Catholic Church
- Appointed: 13 October 1980
- In office: 1980–1996
- Predecessor: New Creation
- Successor: John Stephen Pazak, C.Ss.R.
- Other post: Auxiliary Bishop of the Ukrainian Catholic Eparchy of Toronto (1965–1980)

Orders
- Ordination: 4 July 1949 by Pavel Peter Gojdič, O.S.B.M.
- Consecration: 2 January 1965 by Isidore Borecky

Personal details
- Born: Michael Rusnak; 21 August 1921 Beaverdale, Pennsylvania, United States
- Died: 16 January 2003 (aged 81) Toronto, Ontario, Canada

Michael Rusnak, C.Ss.R., (21 August 1921 – 16 January 2003) was an American-born member of the Congregation of the Most Holy Redeemer, commonly known as the Redemptorist Fathers, who was appointed Eparch of the Slovak Catholic Eparchy of Saints Cyril and Methodius of Toronto by Pope John Paul II in 1980.

== Life ==
Born in 1921 in Beaverdale, Pennsylvania, Rusnak entered the Redemptorists in 1941 and professed religious vows as a member of the Congregation on August 2, 1942. He was ordained a priest on July 4, 1949, by Pavel Peter Gojdič, O.S.B.M., who was later declared a martyr and beatified by the Catholic Church. On August 25, 1964, he was made was Auxiliary Bishop of the Ukrainian Catholic Eparchy of Toronto and titular bishop of Tzernicus.

Rusnak took part in the third and fourth sessions of the Second Vatican Council. Pope John Paul II appointed him Eparch of the Slovak Catholic Eparchy of Saints Cyril and Methodius of Toronto on October 13, 1980. On November 11, 1996, the same pope accepted his resignation.

Rusnak died on 16 January 2003 at the age of 81.

Catholic Church titles
New title	Titular Bishop of Tzernicus; 1964–1980	Succeeded by Jožef Smej
New title	Eparchial Bishop of Saints Cyril and Methodius of Toronto; 1980–1996	Succeeded by John Stephen Pazak
