= Robert Mark Pipta =

American Greek Catholic bishop

His Grace, The Most Reverend Robert Mark Pipta
- Eparch of Parma
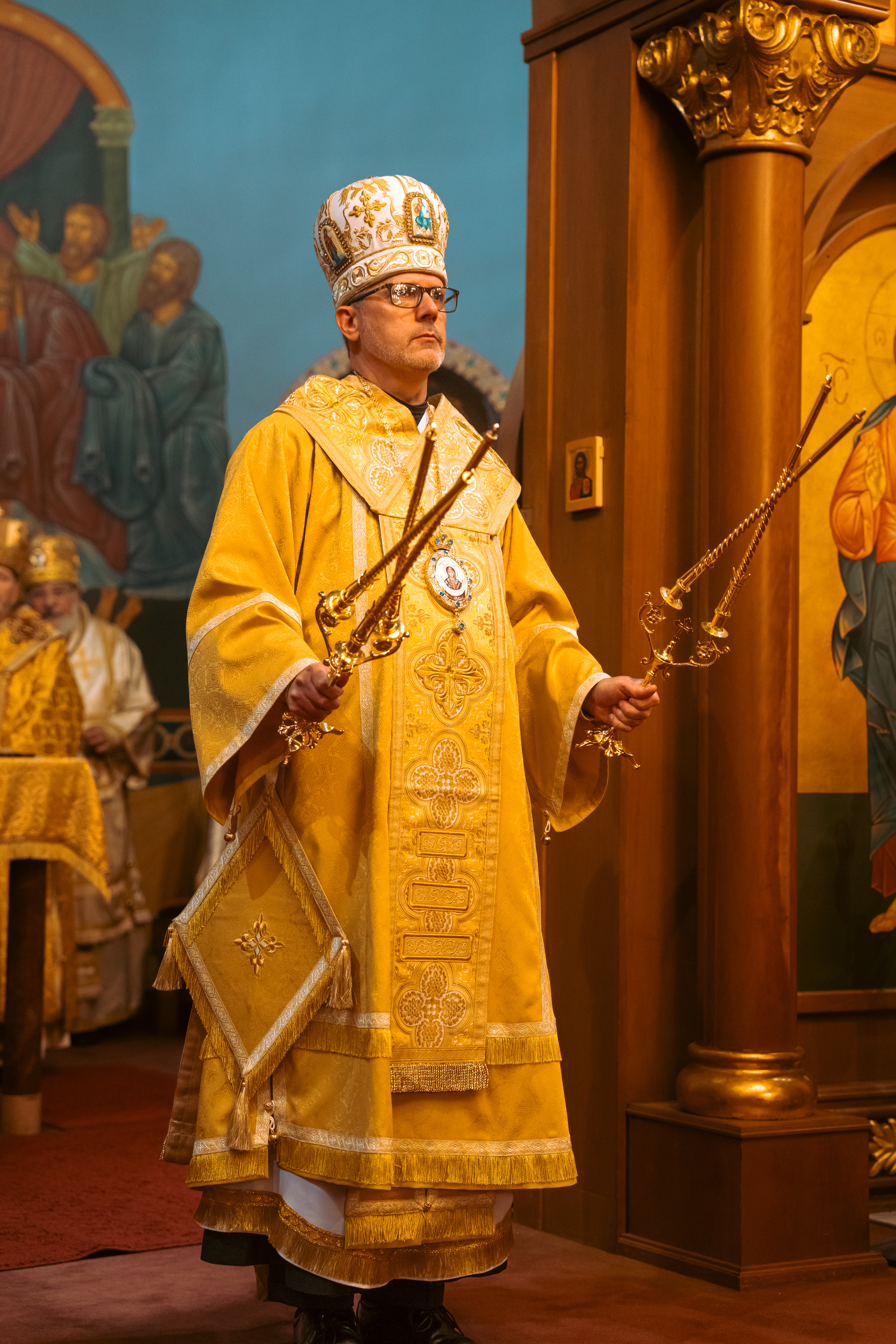
- Pipta in 2023
- Diocese: Parma
- Appointed: August 31, 2023
- Installed: November 8, 2023
- Predecessor: Milan Lach, SJ

Orders
- Ordination: April 21, 1994 by George Martin Kuzma
- Consecration: November 8, 2023 by William C. Skurla, Kurt Burnette, and Nil Lushchak

Personal details
- Born: April 7, 1967 (age 59) Anaheim, California, US
- Motto: May I obey what I preach and be the first to do what I teach

Styles of Robert Mark Pipta
- Reference style: His Grace; The Most Reverend
- Spoken style: His Grace
- Religious style: Eparch

Robert Mark Pipta (born April 7, 1967) is an American Ruthenian Catholic prelate who serves as Eparch of Parma. He was previously rector of Byzantine Catholic Seminary of Saints Cyril and Methodius in Pittsburgh, Pennsylvania.

== Biography ==
He was born on April 7, 1967 in Anaheim, California. He studied at University of California, Irvine from 1985 till 1990, specializating in art and music. After that he studied at seminary of St. Cyril and Methodious in Pittsburgh and he was ordained priest in 1994 by George Martin Kuzma. Kuzma was Pipta's parish priest, before his consecration. He was incardinated into Ruthenian Catholic Eparchy of the Holy Protection of Mary of Phoenix. In 2014 he was appointed as rector of the seminary.

=== Episcopal career ===
On August 31, 2023 he was appointed as the eparch of the Ruthenian Catholic Eparchy of Parma. He was consecrated on November 8, 2023.

== See also ==
- Catholic Church hierarchy
- Catholic Church in the United States
- Historical list of the Catholic bishops of the United States
- List of Catholic bishops of the United States
- Lists of patriarchs, archbishops, and bishops

Catholic Church titles
Preceded by Milan Lach	Eparch of Parma; 2023-Present	Succeeded by Incumbent
