= William C. Skurla =

American Eastern Catholic bishop (born 1956)

His Eminence the Most Reverend William C. Skurla
- Archeparch of Pittsburgh
- Church: Ruthenian Greek Catholic Church
- Metropolis: Archeparchy of Pittsburgh
- Appointed: January 19, 2012
- Installed: April 18, 2012
- Predecessor: Basil Schott
- Previous posts: Eparch of Van Nuys (2002–2008); Eparch of Passaic (2008–2012); Apostolic Administrator of Parma (2016–2017)

Orders
- Ordination: 1986 (deacon) · May 23, 1987 (priest) by Michael Dudick
- Consecration: April 23, 2002 by Andrew Pataki, Basil Schott, and George Kuzma

Personal details
- Born: William Charles Skurla; 1 June 1956 (age 70) Duluth, Minnesota, US
- Denomination: Catholicism
- Motto: May the Lord give you peace

Ordination history
History
Diaconal ordination
- Ordained by: Michael Dudick
Priestly ordination
- Ordained by: Michael Dudick
Episcopal consecration
- Principal consecrator: Andrew Pataki
- Co-consecrators: Basil Schott and George Kuzma
Episcopal succession
Bishops consecrated by William C. Skurla as principal consecrator
- Kurt Richard Burnette: December 4, 2013
- Robert Mark Pipta: November 8, 2023
- Artur Bubnevych: January 28, 2025

Styles of William Charles Skurla
- Reference style: His Eminence; The Most Reverend
- Spoken style: His Eminence
- Religious style: Archeparch

William Charles Skurla (born June 1, 1956) is the Archeparch (or Archbishop) of the Archeparchy of Pittsburgh in the Ruthenian Greek Catholic Church. He is also, ex officio, the metropolitan bishop of the Metropolis of Pittsburgh whose geographic remit includes the entire United States and Canada. He succeeded Archbishop Basil Myron Schott. Skurla was appointed as metropolitan on January 19, 2012, by Pope Benedict XVI and enthroned at the Cathedral of St. John the Baptist in Munhall, Pennsylvania, on April 18, 2012.

== Biography ==
William Charles Skurla was born in Duluth, Minnesota, on June 1, 1956. He graduated from Chisholm High School in Chisholm, Minnesota, in 1974, and received a philosophy degree from Columbia University in 1981. Skurla also studied at the Mary Immaculate Seminary, receiving Master of Divinity and Master of Theology degrees in 1986 and 1987, respectively. He joined a Byzantine Catholic Franciscan community in Sybertsville, Pennsylvania, in 1981 and became a professed member in 1985. Skurla was ordained as a deacon in 1986 and as a priest in 1987 at the St. Mary Byzantine Catholic Church in Freeland, Pennsylvania. From 1996 to 2002 he was the pastoral administrator of the St. Melany Byzantine Catholic Church in Tucson, Arizona.

He was consecrated as a bishop on April 23, 2002, becoming the third bishop of the Byzantine Catholic Eparchy of Van Nuys, and in December 2007 he was appointed as the fourth Bishop of the Byzantine Catholic Eparchy of Passaic. Skurla was enthroned as bishop of the Eparchy of Passaic at the St. Michael Cathedral in Passaic, New Jersey, on January 29, 2008. He was named by Pope Benedict XVI as the fifth Metropolitan of the Byzantine Catholic Metropolitan Church in North America and eighth Archbishop of the Byzantine Catholic Archeparchy of Pittsburgh on January 19, 2012. William Skurla was enthroned as metropolitan on April 18, 2012.

== See also ==
- Catholic Church in the United States
- Historical list of the Catholic bishops of the United States
- List of Catholic bishops in the United States

Catholic Church titles
Preceded by Andrew Pataki	Eparch of Van Nuys; 2002–2008	Succeeded by Kurt Burnette
Preceded by George Kuzma	Eparch of Passaic; 2008–2012	Succeeded by Gerald Nicholas Dino
Preceded by Basil Schott	Archeparch of Pittsburgh; 2012–present	Incumbent
