= Basil Schott =

His Eminence Basil Schott OFM
- Archbishop of Pittsburgh for the Byzantines
- Other post: Bishop of Parma for the Byzantines (1996–2002)

Orders
- Ordination: August 29, 1965
- Consecration: July 9, 2002

Personal details
- Born: September 21, 1939 Freeland, Pennsylvania, US
- Died: June 10, 2010 (aged 70) Pittsburgh, Pennsylvania, US
- Buried: Uniontown, Pennsylvania, US

Basil Myron Schott OFM (September 21, 1939 – June 10, 2010) was the Archbishop of the Byzantine Catholic Archeparchy of Pittsburgh from 2002 until his death.

The youngest son of Michael Schott and Mary Schott (née Krusko), Basil Schott was born in Freeland, Pennsylvania, and attended St. Mary Byzantine Catholic School as a child. He graduated from St. Gabriel High School in Hazleton and entered the Byzantine Franciscan novitiate at Holy Dormition Monastery in Sybertsville on August 3, 1958. He was professed as a Franciscan friar on August 4, 1959. He was ordained to the priesthood on August 29, 1965, by Bishop Stephen J. Kocisko at the Franciscan Monastery in New Canaan, Connecticut. Schott earned bachelor's degrees in philosophy and theology from Immaculate Conception College in Troy, New York, master's degrees in theology and pastoral counseling from St. Mary Seminary in Norwalk, Connecticut, and a Doctor of Ministry degree from New York Theological Seminary in 1969.

As a Franciscan, his talks on spiritual renewal made him a popular retreat leader. On February 3, 1996, he was appointed bishop of the Byzantine Catholic Eparchy of Parma, and was ordained on July 11, 1996. On May 3, 2002, he was appointed as the fourth Archbishop of the Archeparchy of Pittsburgh, and installed on July 9 of the same year. As his episcopal motto, he chose "In the name of the Lord." He was appointed by Pope Benedict XVI as a member of the Congregation for the Oriental Churches.

Schott died at Passavant Hospital in the North Hills of Pittsburgh on June 10, 2010, at age 70, following a seven-month battle with lymphoma. His final pastoral initiative was the first national gathering of all Byzantine Catholic priests from throughout the United States, June 8–9, 2010, which Schott was unable to attend due to his hospitalization. A funeral liturgy was said on June 18, 2010, and Schott was buried in Mount St. Macrina Cemetery, Uniontown.

Catholic Church titles
Preceded by Andrew Pataki	Eparch of Parma; 1996–2002	Succeeded by John M. Kudrick
Preceded by Judson Procyk	Archeparch of Pittsburgh; 2002–2010	Succeeded by William C. Skurla
