= Proto-Cathedral of St. Mary =

Ruthenian Greek Catholic church in the US

Proto-Cathedral of St. Mary Byzantine Catholic Church
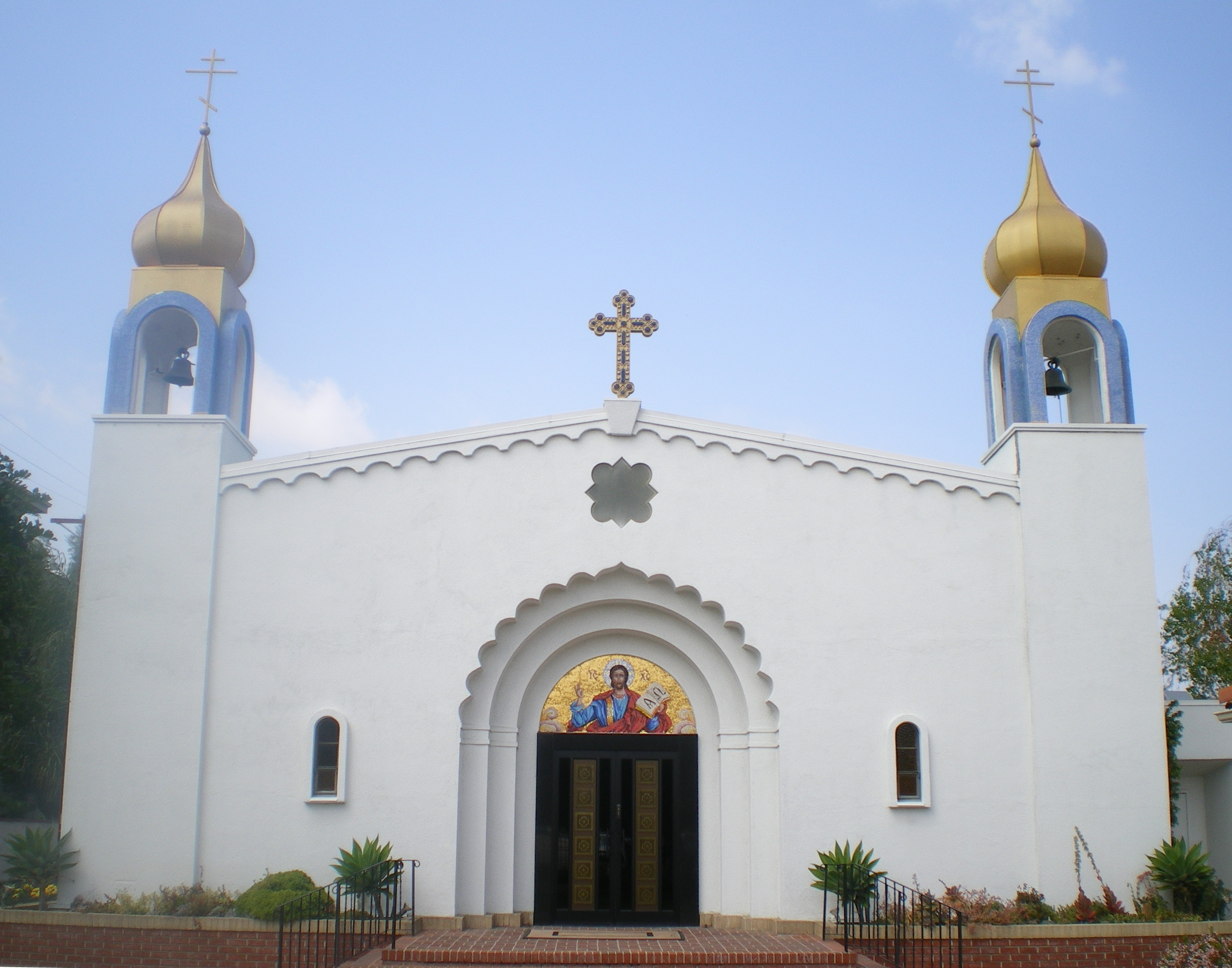
- Proto-Cathedral of St. Mary
- Proto-Cathedral of St. Mary Byzantine Catholic Church
- 34°10′2.93″N 118°27′59.67″W
- Location: Sherman Oaks, California
- Address: 5329 Sepulveda Blvd, Sherman Oaks, CA 91411
- Country: United States of America
- Denomination: Catholic Church
- Sui iuris church: Ruthenian Greek Catholic Church
- Website: byzantinela.com

History
- Status: Proto-cathedral
- Founded: 1956
- Dedicated: 1961

Administration
- Metropolis: Byzantine Catholic Metropolitan Church of Pittsburgh
- Diocese: Byzantine Catholic Eparchy of Phoenix

The Proto-Cathedral of St. Mary or Proto-Cathedral of St. Mary Byzantine Catholic Church is a parish church and proto-cathedral of the Byzantine Catholic Eparchy of Phoenix, serving the Ruthenian Eastern Catholic population of Los Angeles, California, United States. It was the first Byzantine church in California. It is located on Sepulveda Boulevard in Sherman Oaks, Los Angeles, California. It is the only Byzantine Ruthenian Church in the territory of the Roman Catholic Archdiocese of Los Angeles.

In 1956, the bishop of the Byzantine Catholic Archeparchy of Pittsburgh granted permission for a priest to minister in Los Angeles. In 1957, the parish purchased land on Sepulveda Boulevard, and the new church was dedicated in 1961. In 1976, the third pastor, Father Eugene Linowski, re-ordered the liturgical services to conform with the authentic traditions of the Byzantine Church (according to the Recension as prescribed by Rome). An icon screen was installed two years later. The screen maintains a traditional aura of mystery that separates the sanctuary from the rest of the church. At St. Mary's the screen is a wrought iron grill with icons painted by local artist Mila Mina. Fr. Eugene Linowski became the first rector of the cathedral, from March to June 1982.

The Eparchy of Van Nuys was established in 1982 with Most Reverend Thomas Dolinay as the first bishop. Father Michael Moran was named the second rector of the cathedral, served as chancellor, and was later named monsignor. Msgr. Moran was the head of the parish for 22 years. In 2004 Father Melvin Rybarczyk was named rector. Father Michael O’Loughlin was made rector September 1, 2019.

In 2010, with the relocation of the eparchial see to Phoenix, Arizona, the Cathedral of St. Mary was assigned the title of Proto-Cathedral.

== See also ==
- List of Catholic cathedrals in the United States
- List of cathedrals in the United States
