= Ruthenian Catholic Eparchy of Parma =

Eastern Catholic eparchy in Midwest United States

Eparchy of Parma Eparchia Parmensis Ruthenorum
- Coat of arms

Location
- Country: United States
- Ecclesiastical province: Pittsburgh
- Headquarters: Parma, Ohio

Statistics
- Population: (as of 2009); 8,791
- Parishes: 36

Information
- Denomination: Catholic Church
- Sui iuris church: Ruthenian Greek Catholic Church
- Rite: Byzantine Rite
- Established: February 21, 1969 (57 years ago)
- Cathedral: Cathedral of St. John the Baptist

Current leadership
- Pope: Leo XIV
- Eparch: Robert Mark Pipta
- Bishops emeritus: Bishop John Michael Kudrick

Map
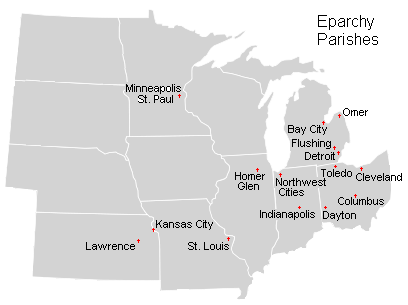

Website
- www.parma.org

The Eparchy of Parma (Latin: Eparchia Parmensis Ruthenorum) is an eparchy (diocese) of the Ruthenian Greek Catholic Church in the midwestern part of the United States. Its episcopal seat is the Cathedral of St. John the Baptist in Parma, Ohio. The eparchy's liturgies utilize the Byzantine Rite.

It is a suffragan diocese of the Archeparchy of Pittsburgh in the ecclesiastical province of Pittsburgh. The metropolis is dependent upon the Roman Congregation for the Oriental Churches. The eparchy is sometimes styled as the "Byzantine Catholic Eparchy of Parma", referring to the title that the Ruthenian Greek Catholic Church uses in the United States.

== Statistics ==
As of 2014, the Byzantine Catholic Eparchy of Parma pastorally served 9,020 Eastern Catholics in Illinois, Indiana, Kansas, Michigan, Minnesota, Missouri and Ohio in 28 parishes and 5 missions with 36 priests (diocesan), 16 deacons, 6 lay religious (6 sisters), 2 seminarians. Ten parishes in the Youngstown, Ohio area are part of the Byzantine Catholic Archeparchy of Pittsburgh.

== History ==
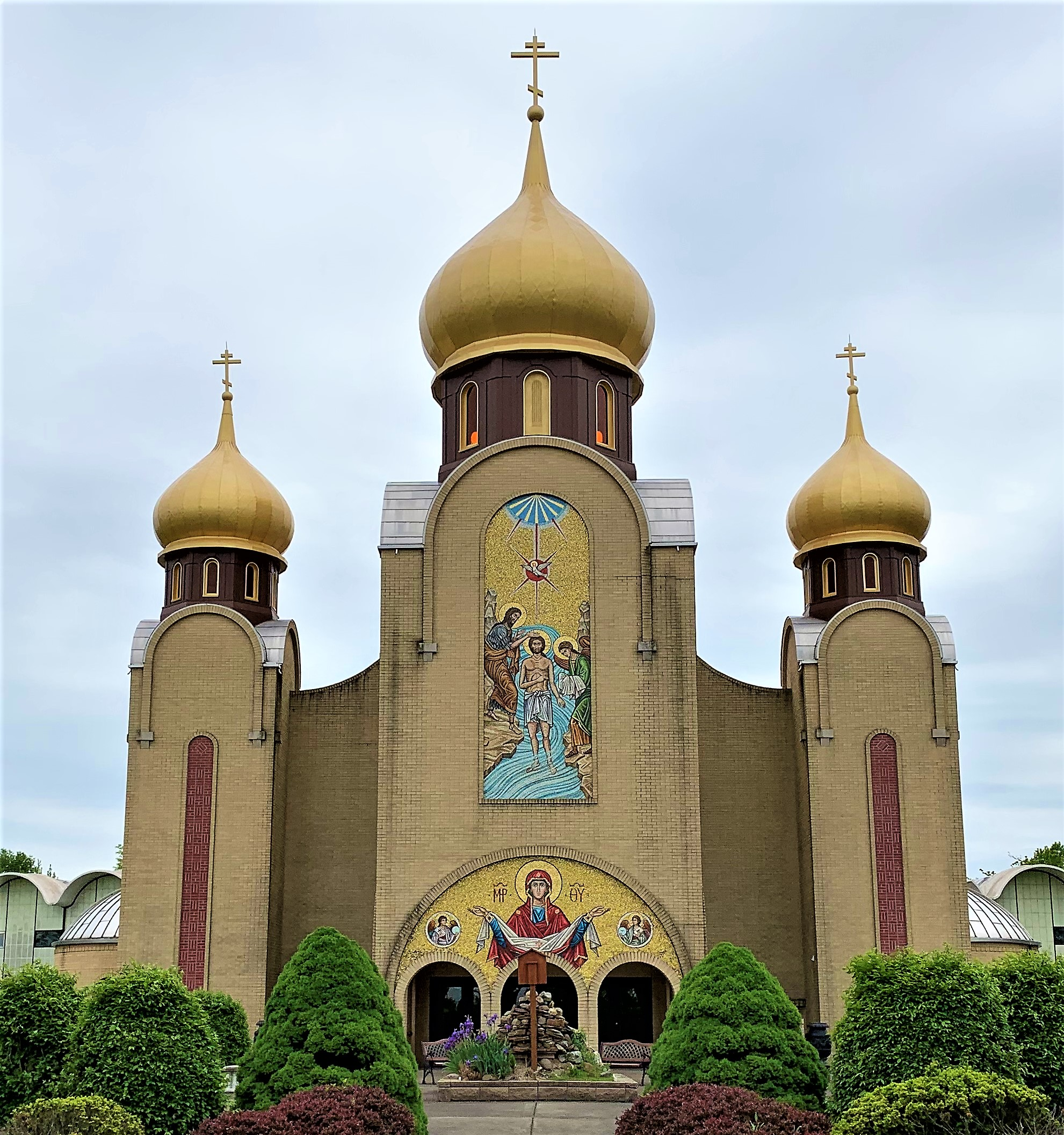
The former St. John the Baptist Cathedral in Parma.

The eparchy was erected on February 21, 1969, by Pope Paul VI as the Eparchy of Parma (of the Ruthenians) / Eparchia Parmen(sis) Ruthenorum (Latin), on US territory split off from its present Metropolitan, then the Eparchy of Pittsburgh. On March 22, 1969, Father John Mihalik was appointed as its first ordinary. He was consecrated as its eparch by Archbishop Stephen Kocisko on 12 June 1969. On May 30, 1983, Father Andrew Pataki was appointed as the Auxiliary Bishop of the Eparchy of Passaic and consecrated by Kocisko on 23 August 1983 with the title of Titular Bishop of Telmissus. When Mihalik died on 27 January 1984 Parma's see became sede vacante. Pataki was appointed as the eparch on June 19, 1984 and was installed on August 16, 1985.

The eparchy lost ecclesiastical territory on December 3, 1981, when the Eparchy of Van Nuys was erected. In 2024, the Cathedral of St. John the Baptist was relocated from its original Snow Road location to the former Holy Spirit Church in Parma. The two Parma parishes along with the Dormition of the Mother of God parish in Cleveland had been merged in 2021.

== Episcopal Ordinaries ==
The following bishops have been appointed as ordinaries of Parma eparchy.

1. Emil John Mihalik (1969-1984)
2. Andrew Pataki (1984-1995), appointed Bishop of Passaic of the Ruthenians
3. Basil Myron Schott, O.F.M., (1996-2002), appointed Archbishop of Pittsburgh of the Ruthenians
4. John Michael Kudrick (2002-2016)
5. Milan Lach, S.J. (2018–2023)
  1. Kurt Burnette (Apostolic Administrator, 2023)
6. Robert Mark Pipta (2023-present)

== Churches ==
- St. Basil the Great Byzantine Catholic Church Sterling Heights, MI
- Sacred Heart Byzantine Catholic Church Livonia, MI
- St. Michael Byzantine Catholic Church Toledo
- St. Anthony the Great Byzantine Catholic Parish St. Louis, Missouri
- Cathedral of Saint John the Baptist Parma, Ohio
- St. John the Baptist Byzantine Catholic Church Minneapolis, Minnesota
- St. Mary Byzantine Catholic Church Marblehead, Ohio

== See also ==
- Byzantine Catholic Metropolitan Church of Pittsburgh
- Byzantine Catholic Archeparchy of Pittsburgh
- Byzantine Catholic Eparchy of Passaic
- Byzantine Catholic Eparchy of Phoenix
- Byzantine Catholic Exarchate of Saints Cyril and Methodius of Toronto
- List of the Catholic bishops of the United States § Eastern Catholic eparchs

== Sources and external links ==
- Ruthenian Catholic Eparchy of Parma Official Site
- The Archeparchy of Pittsburgh
- Metropolia of Pittsburgh
- GCatholic, with Google map -data for all sections
- Eparchy of Parma (Ruthenian) at Catholic-Hierarchy.org
- Byzantine Catholic Metropolia of Pittsburgh (1999). Byzantine-Ruthenian Metropolitan Church of Pittsburgh Directory. Pittsburgh: Byzantine Catholic Metropolitan Church of Pittsburgh. ISBN none.
- Magocsi, Paul Robert and Ivan Pop (2005). Encyclopedia of Rusyn History and Culture. Toronto: University of Toronto Press. ISBN 0-8020-3566-3.
