= Gerald Nicholas Dino =

Ruthenian Catholic bishop (1940–2020)

His Grace, The Most Reverend Gerald Nicholas Dino
- Eparch Emeritus of Phoenix
- Church: Ruthenian Greek Catholic Church
- Diocese: Ruthenian Catholic Eparchy of the Holy Protection of Mary of Phoenix
- Installed: March 27, 2008
- Term ended: May 7, 2016
- Predecessor: William Skurla
- Successor: John Stephen Pazak
- Previous posts: Priest, Eparchy of Passaic

Orders
- Ordination: March 21, 1965
- Consecration: March 27, 2008 by Basil Schott, William Skurla and Andrew Pataki

Personal details
- Born: January 11, 1940 Binghamton, New York
- Died: November 14, 2020 (aged 80)

Styles of Gerald Nicholas Dino
- Reference style: His Grace; The Most Reverend
- Spoken style: His Grace
- Religious style: Eparch

Gerald Nicholas Dino (January 11, 1940 – November 14, 2020) was an American hierarch of the Ruthenian Catholic Church. He was the bishop of the Byzantine Catholic Eparchy of Phoenix from 2008 to 2016.

== Biography ==
Dino was born in 1940 in Binghamton, New York. On March 21, 1965, he was ordained a priest for the Byzantine Catholic Eparchy of Passaic. On December 6, 2007, Pope Benedict XVI appointed him bishop of the Eparchy of Van Nuys, and on March 27, 2008, he was consecrated a bishop.

At his request, Pope Benedict XVI transferred the see of the Eparchy of Van Nuys to Phoenix, Arizona in February 2010.

On reaching the age of 75, Dino submitted his resignation to Pope Francis, who accepted it and appointed his successor John Stephen Pazak in May 2016.

Dino died on November 14, 2020, aged 80.

== Episcopal succession ==
Catholic Church titles
| Preceded by William C. Skurla | Eparch of the Holy Protection of Mary of Phoenix; 2008–2016 | Succeeded by John Stephen Pazak |
