= George Kuzma =

American Ruthenian Greek Catholic bishop (1925–2008)

The Most Reverend George Martin Kuzma
- Auxiliary Bishop of the Ruthenian Catholic Eparchy of Passaic
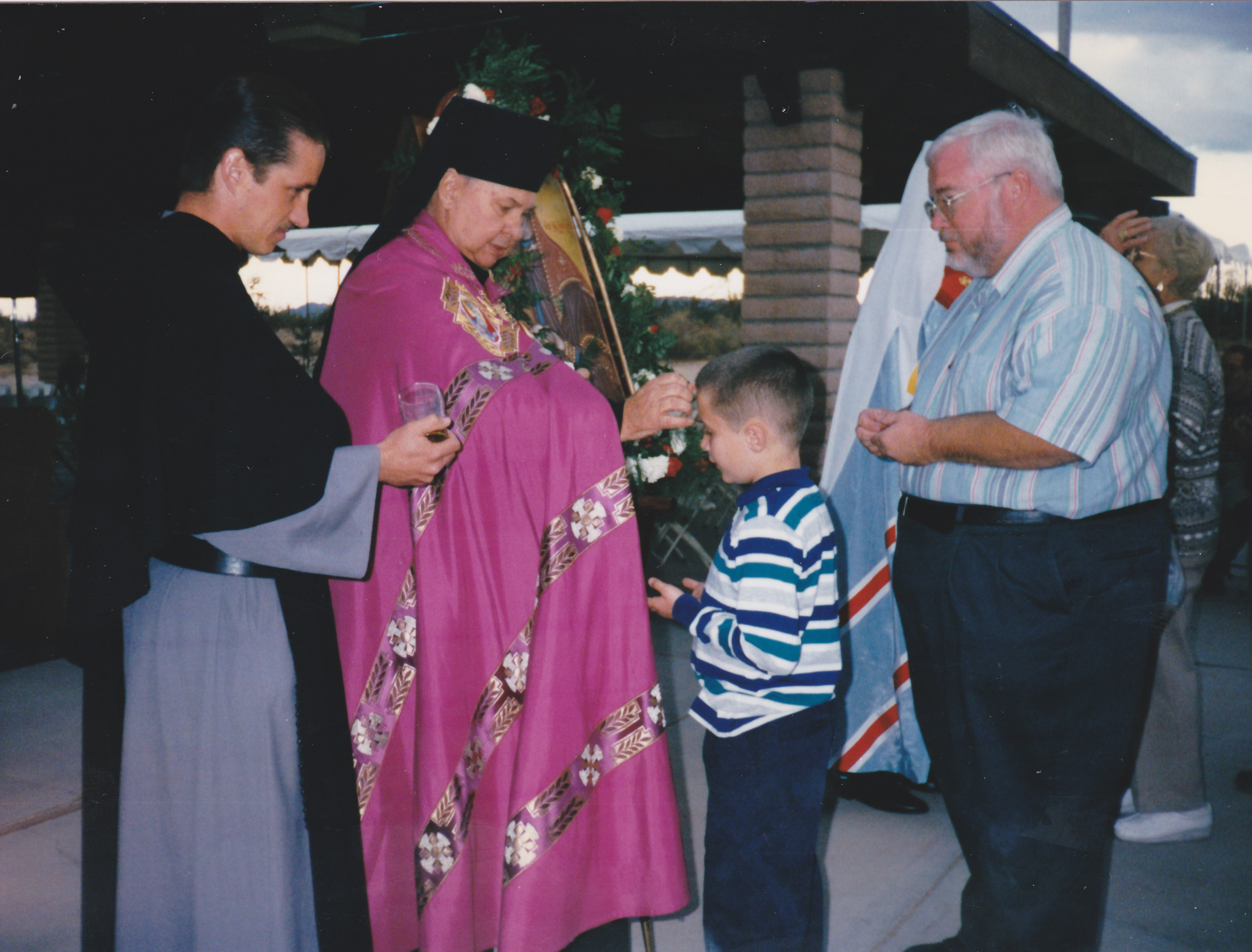
- Kuzma gives a blessing after a pilgrimage in California
- Church: Ruthenian Greek Catholic Church
- Diocese: Ruthenian Catholic Eparchy of Passaic

Orders
- Ordination: 29 May 1955 by Nicholas Thomas Elko
- Consecration: 4 February 1987 by Stephen John Kocisko, Michael Joseph Dudick, and Thomas Victor Dolinay

Personal details
- Born: George Martin Kuzma; 24 July 1925
- Died: December 7, 2008 (aged 83)
- Buried: Uniontown, Pennsylvania
- Denomination: Catholic Church

Ordination history
History
Priestly ordination
- Ordained by: Nicholas Thomas Elko
Episcopal consecration
- Principal consecrator: Stephen John Kocisko
- Co-consecrators: Michael Joseph Dudick, and Thomas Victor Dolinay
- Styles
- Reference style: His Grace; The Most Reverend
- Spoken style: His Grace
- Religious style: Bishop

George Martin Kuzma (July 24, 1925 – December 7, 2008) was an American bishop of the Ruthenian Greek Catholic Church.

At the age of 29, Kuzma was ordained as a priest. He was appointed auxiliary bishop of Passaic in New Jersey on November 11, 1986. He was later appointed Bishop of Van Nuys in California on October 23, 1990. He retired from the post on December 5, 2000. He was succeeded by Bishop William Skurla.

Kuzma died on December 7, 2008, and is buried in Uniontown, Pennsylvania.
