= John Bilock =

American Roman Catholic priest

Most Reverend John Michael Bilock
- Auxiliary Bishop of Pittsburgh
- Church: Ruthenian Catholic Church
- Diocese: Titular See of Pergamum
- Appointed: March 1, 1973
- In office: May 15, 1973 – September 8, 1994

Orders
- Ordination: February 3, 1946
- Consecration: May 15, 1973 by Stephen Kocisko

Personal details
- Born: June 20, 1916 McAdoo, Pennsylvania
- Died: September 8, 1994 (aged 78) Pittsburgh, Pennsylvania

John Michael Bilock (June 20, 1916 – September 8, 1994) was a bishop of the Catholic Church in the United States. He served as the Auxiliary Bishop of Byzantine Catholic Archeparchy of Pittsburgh from 1973 to 1994.

== Early life and education ==
Born in McAdoo, Pennsylvania, John Michael Bilock was educated at St. Procopius College and Seminary in Lisle, Illinois. He was ordained a priest on February 3, 1946.

== Priesthood ==
Bilock's pastoral assignments as a priest included St. John the Baptist in Hazleton, Pennsylvania, and St. John Chrysostom in Pittsburgh. In 1955 he became the personal secretary of Bishop Nicholas Elko as well as the secretary to the Board of Consultors. A year later he became a consultor, and on May 7, 1957, he was named a Papal Chamberlain, with the title of Monsignor, by Pope Pius XII. In 1963 Bilock was appointed the rector of St. John the Baptist Cathedral in Munhall, Pennsylvania. Six years later he was named vicar general of the archeparchy, and he was made a Prelate of Honor by Pope Paul VI.

== Episcopacy ==
Pope Paul VI named Bilock as the Titular Bishop of Pergamum and Auxiliary Bishop of Pittsburgh (Ruthenian) on March 1, 1973. He was consecrated a bishop by Archbishop Stephen Kocisko on May 15, 1973, at Holy Spirit Church in Pittsburgh. The principal co-consecrators were Bishops Michael Dudick of Passaic and Emil Mihalik of Parma. Throughout his ministry as priest and bishop, Bilock celebrated the Divine Liturgy weekly over radio station WEDO. After the death of Archbishop Thomas Dolinay he was elected by the Board of Consultors as the Apostolic Administrator of the archeparchy in 1993. Bilock died of a heart attack on September 8, 1994, at St. Francis Medical Center in Pittsburgh at the age of 78. His funeral was celebrated at St. John the Baptist Cathedral and he was buried at the Mount St. Macrina Motherhouse in Uniontown, Pennsylvania
