= Stephen Kocisko =

American Rusyn Greek Catholic Metropolitan Archbishop

- Archeparch of Pittsburgh
- Church: Ruthenian Greek Catholic Church
- Archdiocese: Archeparchy of Pittsburgh
- In office: December 22, 1967 – June 12, 1991
- Predecessor: Nicholas Elko
- Successor: Thomas Dolinay
- Previous posts: Eparch of Passaic (1963-1967); Titular Eparch of Theveste (1956-1963); Auxiliary Eparch of the United States of America (1956-1963)

Orders
- Ordination: March 30, 1941 by Alexander Evreinov
- Consecration: October 23, 1956 by Nicholas Elko

Personal details
- Born: Stephen John Kocisko; June 11, 1915 Minneapolis, Minnesota, United States
- Died: March 7, 1995 (aged 79)

Stephen John Kocisko (June 11, 1915 – March 7, 1995) was the first Metropolitan Archbishop of the Byzantine Catholic Metropolitan Church of Pittsburgh, the American branch of the Ruthenian Greek Catholic Church.

== Early life ==
Stephen Kocisko was born June 11, 1915, in Minneapolis, Minnesota, to Rusyn immigrant parents, John Kocisko and Anna Somos; John and Anna had a background of both Greek Catholic Ruysn and Lutheran Slovak.

Stephen graduated from De La Salle Catholic High School then studied at Nazareth Hall Preparatory Seminary in St. Paul, Minnesota. Bishop Basil Takach sent him to St. Josaphat's Seminary in Rome, Italy for philosophical and theological education, where he earned a Licentiate (Master's) Degree in Sacred Theology. Bishop Alexander Evreinoff, the ordaining prelate for the Byzantine Catholics in Rome, ordained him to the priesthood on March 30, 1941, just before to his return to the United States.

He first served as pastor in Detroit, Michigan and Lyndora, Pennsylvania. He also served as a member of the Exarchate's Matrimonial Tribunal and as professor of Patrology at the Byzantine Catholic Seminary of SS. Cyril and Methodius. Bishop Nicholas Elko appointed him in 1956 as the Chancellor of the Exarchate.

Bishop Elko, faced with a growing number of parishes, petitioned the Holy See for an auxiliary bishop. On October 23, 1956, Kocisko was ordained as a bishop at the Cathedral of Saint Paul of the Roman Catholic Diocese of Pittsburgh in the Oakland district.

Bishop Kocisko began residence at Holy Ghost Parish on the city's North Side. For the next seven years, he served as auxiliary bishop and was appointed Rector of the seminary and Vicar General.

== Rome upgrades the American Church's status ==
Since its inception in 1924 as the "Apostolic Exarchate of United States of America, Faithful of the Oriental Rite (Ruthenian)", the organizational status of the Church was merely that of a missionary territory with limited self-governing authority, the homeland being Europe - albeit under Communist persecution since 1946.

On July 6, 1963, the Vatican upgraded the status of the church from Exarchate to Eparchy, or diocese according to the Latin-Rite terminology. A decree by the newly elected Pope Paul VI divided the entire U.S. territory of the Church into two separate ecclesiastical jurisdictions. The first, the Byzantine Catholic Eparchy of Passaic, included the Eastern states and the second jurisdiction, centered in Pittsburgh, included the rest of the nation. Both jurisdictions now held the canonical status of an eparchy or a full diocese. Bishop Elko continued as the American Church's senior hierarch, but Kocisko was selected as the first bishop for Passaic and was installed on July 6, 1963.

== Episcopate of Bishop Kocisko ==
Ordination history of Stephen Kocisko
History
Episcopal consecration
- Consecrated by: Nicholas Elko
Episcopal succession
Bishops consecrated by Stephen Kocisko as principal consecrator
- Michael Dudick: October 24, 1968
- Emil John Mihalik: June 12, 1969
- John Bilock: May 15, 1973
- Thomas Dolinay: November 23, 1976
- Andrew Pataki: August 23, 1983
- George Kuzma: February 4, 1987

In 1963 Kocisko moved from Pittsburgh and began building an eparchy in Passaic from the ground up: constructing a residence, chancery, and setting up an administration. He launched a new weekly newspaper to serve the Passaic Eparchy, The Eastern Catholic Life. He also found time to simultaneously participate in Second Vatican Council in Rome.

=== Controversy in Pittsburgh ===
By 1967, Bishop Elko's popularity within his own Church waned, and his authoritative management style agitated many priests and laity. The Vatican transferred Elko to Rome, where he was elevated to the dignity of an archbishop and appointed as the ordaining prelate for the Byzantine Catholics in Rome and head of the Ecumenical Commission on the Liturgy. This prompted his resignation as Byzantine Catholic Bishop of Pittsburgh, and Monsignor Edward V. Rosack, the Chancellor of the Eparchy, was named as the temporary apostolic administrator.

Time Magazine reported on the unusual situation, noting that a "bishop is almost never separated from his see. For the past seven months, however, the Most Rev. Nicholas T. Elko, Ruthenian-rite bishop of Pittsburgh, has been in Rome, barred by his church superiors from returning to his diocese. The case of Bishop Elko, who describes his situation as 'exile', casts fascinating light on Catholicism's current internal stresses. . . ."

The Vatican next appointed Kocisko on December 22, 1967, to replace Elko as the chief hierarch. He was installed Bishop of Pittsburgh on March 3, 1968. Michael Dudick replaced Kocisko as Bishop of Passaic.

=== Again Rome upgrades the American Church's status ===
Pope Paul VI on February 21, 1969, published a decree entitled Quandoquidem Christus, which elevated the status of the Byzantine Catholic Church in America from two separate eparchies to a metropolia. The Eparchy of Pittsburgh now rose to the status of an Archeparchy, or archdiocese in Latin Church terminology, to be headed by an archbishop and to be called the Byzantine Catholic Archeparchy of Pittsburgh. The Eparchy of Passaic became a suffragan or elemental part of the Metropolia. The Pope next created a new suffragan eparchy from the western territory of the Pittsburgh Eparchy to be based in Parma, Ohio.

On February 29, 1969, Paul VI appointed Bishop Stephen Kocisko, Bishop of Pittsburgh, to head the new Byzantine Metropolia and elevated him to the status of Archbishop. Bishop Michael Dudick, who succeeded him in Passaic in 1968, remained as the head of the Passaic Eparchy. Father Emil Mihalik, the Chancellor of the Passaic Eparchy, became the first bishop for the new Parma Eparchy.

=== The First Rusyn Metropolitan ===
Kocisko was installed as the first Metropolitan in the history of the Rusyn people by the Apostolic Delegate to the United States, Most Reverend Luigi Raimondi. The ceremony took place June 11, 1969 in Holy Spirit Byzantine Catholic Church in the Oakland section of Pittsburgh.

Archbishop Kocisko's new administration placed renewed emphasis on Eastern theological tradition and practices. He established an Office of Religious Education, a Cantor's Institute, and directed the establishment of an Archeparchial Museum to preserve and maintain religious articles, icons, books, and paintings of historical interest.

Kocisko also sought to instill a strong historical consciousness in the minds of the faithful of the Metropolitan Province. He encouraged and oversaw numerous publications regarding the history of the Ruthenian Greek Catholic Church in Eastern Europe. Many of these books and pamphlets were about the lives of the bishops and priests of the Eparchies of Mukachevo and Prijashiv (Preshov), who had suffered martyrdom, imprisonment and hardships during the liquidation of the Greek Catholic Church in Ukraine and Subcarpathian Rus by the Soviet regime.

On December 6, 1971, Kocisko, along with Bishops Dudick and Mihalik, published a pastoral letter observing the 325th anniversary of the Union of Uzhhorod and the 200th anniversary of the canonical erection of the Eparchy of Mukacheo as a self-governing entity. In the letter, Metropolitan Kocisko and the other bishops called to task the Synod of Bishops of the Russian Orthodox Church held in Zagorsk, USSR from May 30 through June 2 of that same year. On June 1, the Russian bishops officially declared the Union of Uzhhorod to be annulled, justifying the liquidation of the Greek Catholic Church in Ukraine and other countries of the Soviet bloc. The pastoral letter uses language typical of Kocisko's approach, referring to Subcarpathian Rus as "our occupied homeland" and "our ancestral home.".

To promote the role of the Byzantine Catholic Church on a national level, he erected in 1974 a Byzantine chapel in the National Shrine of the Immaculate Conception in Washington, DC.

In 1986, Archbishop Kocisko, together with the bishops of the Byzantine Ruthenian Metropolitan Province, initiated the causes for the canonizations of three bishops of Subcarpathian Rus who had been martyred or suffered as confessors of the faith under the Soviet regime. Although these processes are normally performed within the territorial jurisdiction where the person lived, the unique situation of the liquidation of the Greek Catholic Church in Eastern Europe prompted Kocisko to act in his position of Metropolitan of the Ruthenians in the United States. Bishop Theodore Romzha, eparch of Mukachevo, Bishop Paul Peter Gojdich, OSBM, eparch of Prijashev and Bishop Basil Hopko, auxiliary bishop of Prijashev were the first to be considered. Shortly thereafter, as more information became available from behind the Iron Curtain, the name of Bishop Alexander Chira, Romzha's successor as bishop of Mukachevo in the catacomb church was added.

On December 17, 1994, the causes of these bishops were canonically opened in their native eparchies, continuing the work begun under Kocisko. Subsequently, on June 27, 2001, Pope John Paul II beatified Bishop Romzha along with other Ukrainian martyrs of the communist yoke during a Divine Liturgy in Lviv. Bishop Gojdich was beatified by the same pontiff on November 4, 2001. September 14, 2003 saw the beatification of Bishop Hopko by John Paul during a visit to Bratislava, Slovakia.

=== Communism ends in Europe ===
In February 1990, as Communist rule ended in Eastern Europe, Archbishop Kocisko led a delegation of American Byzantine Catholic hierarchs to the Eparchies of Prešov and Mukacevo to show solidarity with them after 40 years of separation and persecution.

== Final years ==
As the Communist regime started to fall in the Soviet Union, February 1990 saw Archbishop Kocisko travelling to Eastern Europe with a team of American Byzantine Catholic clergy and religious to visit Byzantine centers in Prešov (Slovakia) and Mukačevo (Ukraine).

Archbishop Kocisko resigned as Metropolitan Archbishop of Pittsburgh on June 11, 1990, his seventy-fifth birthday.

He died at age 79 on March 7, 1995. He is buried in the cemetery of Mount Saint Macrina Monastery in Uniontown, Pennsylvania.

== Notes ==
Catholic Church titles
| Preceded by Nicholas Elko | Archbishop of the Metropolia of Pittsburgh (Ruthenian); 1967–1990 | Succeeded by Thomas Dolinay |
