= Judson Procyk =

- Metropolitan Archeparch of Pittsburgh
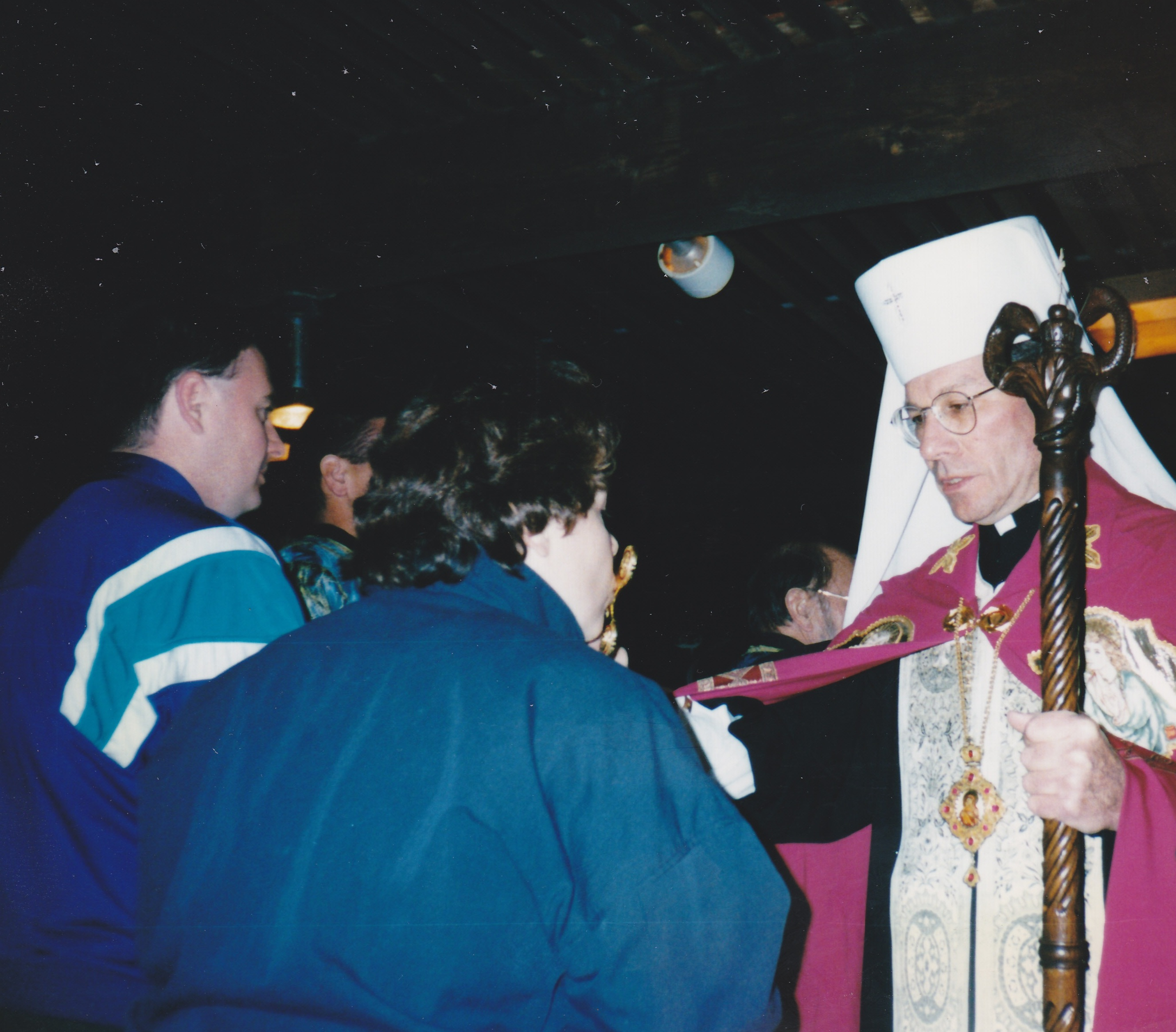
- Metropolitan Procyk holds the cross for veneration after Vespers at a monastery pilgrimage in California
- Church: Ruthenian Greek Catholic Church
- Archdiocese: Archeparchy of Pittsburgh
- In office: November 9, 1994 – April 21, 2001
- Predecessor: Thomas Dolinay
- Successor: Basil Schott

Orders
- Ordination: 19 May 1957 by Nicholas Elko
- Consecration: 7 February 1995 by Michael Dudick

Personal details
- Born: Judson Michael Procyk; April 9, 1931 Uniontown, Pennsylvania, United States
- Died: April 24, 2001 (aged 70)

Judson Michael Procyk (April 9, 1931 – April 24, 2001) was the third Metropolitan Archbishop of the Byzantine Catholic Metropolitan Church of Pittsburgh, the American branch of the Ruthenian Greek Catholic Church.

== Formative years ==
Procyk was born in Uniontown, Pennsylvania on April 9, 1931. He was ordained as a priest at Saints Cyril and Methodius Seminary in Pittsburgh on 19 May 1957.

== Career ==
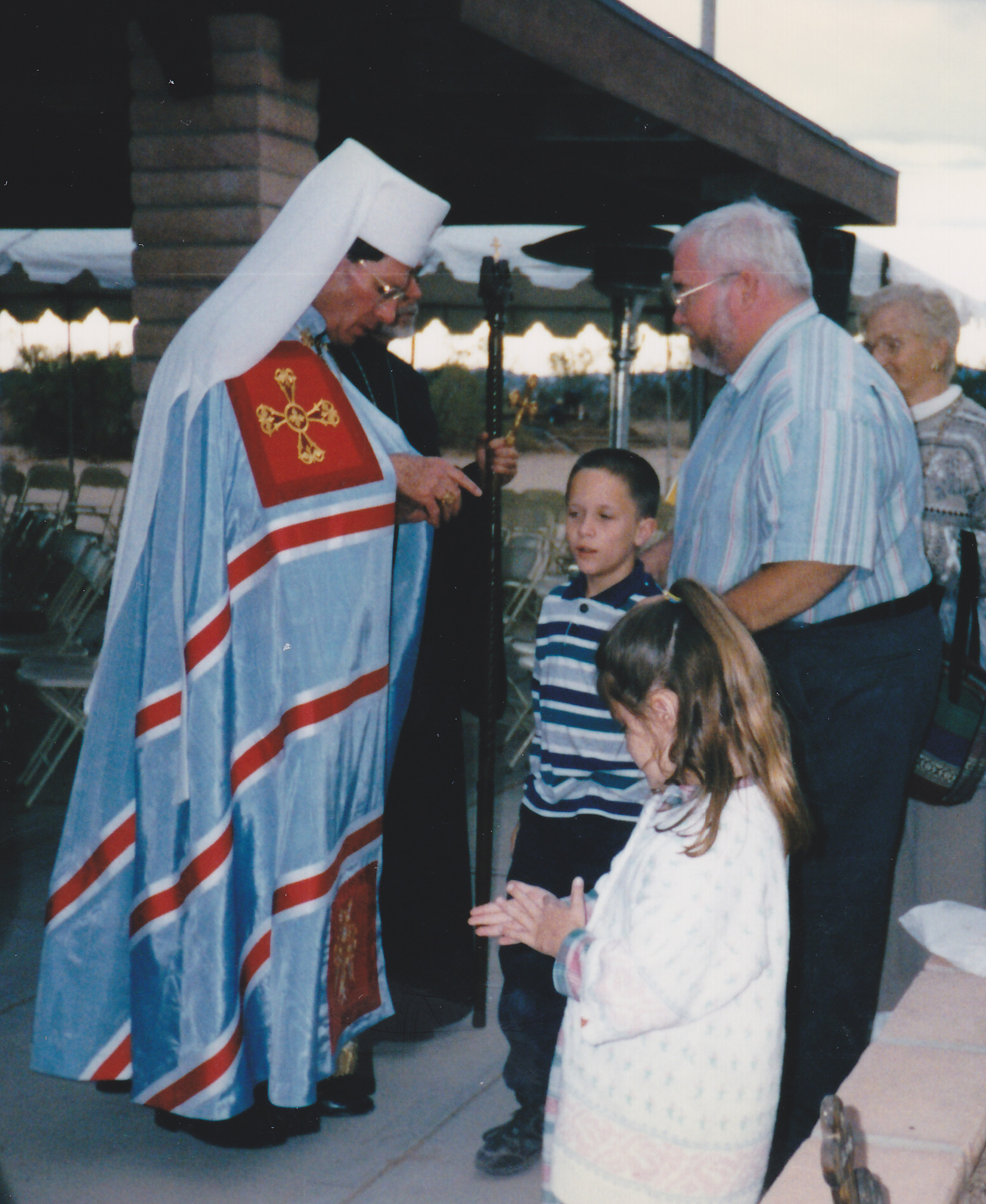
Metropolitan Judson Procyk blesses pilgrims from a pilgrimage at Holy Resurrection Monastery, an Eastern Catholic monastery in California.

Judson Procyk was appointed Archbishop of the Byzantine Catholic Archeparchy of Pittsburgh on November 9, 1994, and ordained a bishop on 7 February 1995.

Catholic Church titles
Preceded by Thomas Dolinay	Archbishop of the Metropolia of Pittsburgh (Ruthenian); 1994–2001	Succeeded by Basil Schott
