= Thomas Dolinay =

Byzantine Catholic Archbishop

- Archeparch of Pittsburgh
- Church: Ruthenian Greek Catholic Church
- Archdiocese: Archeparchy of Pittsburgh
- In office: May 16 1991 – April 13, 1993
- Predecessor: Stephen Kocisko
- Successor: Judson Procyk
- Previous posts: Coadjutor Archeparch of Pittsburgh (1990-1991); Eparch of Van Nuys (1981-1990); Titular Eparch of Thyatira (1976-1981); Auxiliary Eparch of Passaic (1976-1981)

Orders
- Ordination: May 16, 1948 by Daniel Ivancho
- Consecration: November 23, 1976 by Stephen Kocisko

Personal details
- Born: Thomas Victor Dolinay; July 24, 1923 Uniontown, Pennsylvania, United States
- Died: April 13, 1993 (aged 69)

Thomas Victor Dolinay (July 24, 1923 – April 13, 1993) was the second Metropolitan Archbishop of the Byzantine Catholic Metropolitan Church of Pittsburgh, the American branch of the Ruthenian Catholic Church.

== Early life ==
Born on 24 July 1923 to Rusyn immigrant parents in Uniontown, Pennsylvania, Dolinay’s father was a Greek Catholic priest, as was his grandfather. Dolinay attended public schools in Struthers, Ohio, and Uniontown and graduated in 1941. He earned his undergraduate degree at St. Procopius College in Lisle, Illinois in 1945 and completed his theological studies at the Benedictine Seminary in 1948. On May 16, 1948, Bishop Daniel Ivancho ordained him to the priesthood in the chapel of Mount Saint Macrina Monastery in Uniontown.

Dolinay had parish assignments for the next 18 years throughout the Pittsburgh Exarchate and the Passaic Eparchy. He also served as the first managing editor of The Byzantine Catholic World and the first editor of the Eastern Catholic Life eparchial newspapers. Pope Paul VI named him a papal chamberlain with the title Monsignor in 1966.

== Episcopate ==
Monsignor Dolinay became the first auxiliary bishop of the Passaic Eparchy on November 23, 1976. His installation was held at St. Peter's Roman Catholic Cathedral in Scranton, Pennsylvania. He was auxiliary to Bishop Michael Dudick, and served as the Vicar for the churches located in Eastern Pennsylvania.

=== Eparchy of Van Nuys ===
Since the 1950s the Byzantine Catholic Church had experienced growth in the western United States, establishing parishes there. On December 3, 1981, Pope John Paul II by decree established a new eparchy, the Eparchy of Van Nuys, composed of 13 western states. Its center was Van Nuys, California, a suburb of Los Angeles, and its cathedral would be at St. Mary's Church, the first Byzantine Catholic parish formed in the western United States. John Paul II appointed the auxiliary bishop of the Passaic Eparchy, Dolinay, to head the newly created Van Nuys Eparchy.

The Byzantine Catholic Eparchy of Van Nuys was canonically erected on March 9, 1982. At the same time Metropolitan Archbishop Stephen Kocisko installed Dolinay as the first Bishop at a ceremony in St. Cyril of Jerusalem Roman Catholic Church in Encino, California. Archbishop Pio Laghi, the Apostolic Delegate to the United States, read the papal decrees; Timothy Manning, the Cardinal Archbishop of Los Angeles, was the homilist.

In 1990, with the retirement of Archbishop Kocisko of Pittsburgh approaching, Pope John Paul II relieved Dolinay of his duties as Bishop of Van Nuys and appointed him Coadjutor Archbishop of the Byzantine Catholic Archeparchy of Pittsburgh on February 19, 1990. The Pope appointed the Auxiliary Bishop of Passaic, George Kuzma, to succeed Bishop Dolinay.

=== Metropolitan Dolinay ===
Kocisko submitted his resignation and entered into retirement on May 16, 1991, automatically making Dolinay the second Metropolitan of the Byzantine Catholic Metropolia.

After a brief illness he unexpectedly died at age 69 on April 13, 1993; he is buried in the cemetery of Mount Saint Macrina Monastery in Uniontown, Pennsylvania.

Catholic Church titles
Preceded by Stephen Kocisko	Archbishop of the Metropolia of Pittsburgh (Ruthenian); 1991–1993	Succeeded by Judson Procyk
