= Martin Butlin =

British art historian (born 1929)

- Born: 7 June 1929 (age 97); West Bromwich, England
- Occupation: Art Historian
- Awards: CBE

Academic background
- Education: Trinity College, Cambridge Courtauld Institute of Art

Martin Richard Fletcher Butlin, CBE, FBA (born 7 June 1929) is a British art historian. His main field of study is British art history and his published works reflect, in particular, a study of art of the 18th and 19th centuries. He is an authority on J.M.W. Turner (1775–1851) and William Blake (1757–1827).

== Early life ==
Butlin was born on 7 June 1929, his birth registered in West Bromwich. He was educated at Rendcomb College in Gloucestershire before going up to Trinity College, Cambridge, and later the Courtauld Institute of Art, London.

== Career ==
Butlin was appointed Assistant Keeper of the Historic British Collection at the Tate Gallery in 1955, a post he held until 1967, when he was then appointed Keeper, a post he held for 22 years, ending in 1989. Since that time he has been a consultant to Christie's in London.

Butlin was appointed CBE in the 1990 New Year Honours. He is a Fellow of the British Academy.

Throughout his working life Butlin has researched assiduously, producing a number of publications in his area of expertise. Amongst these is included a catalogue raisonné of the paintings and drawings of William Blake.

Butlin co-authored with Evelyn Joll The Paintings of J. M. W. Turner, first published in 1977, both authors receiving the Mitchell Prize for the History of Art a year later. The book was described in Joll's obituary as a "... fully rounded catalogue raisonné of some 560 paintings..."

Photographs attributed to Butlin appear at the Courtauld Institute's of Art's Conway Library. This is a collection of mainly architectural images containing glass and film negatives as well as prints. The collection is currently being digitised as part of the wider project Courtauld Connects.

== Selected publications ==
=== Works on William Blake ===
- William Blake (1757-1827): A Complete Catalogue of the Works of William Blake in the Tate Gallery, Tate Gallery, 1957, 2nd edition 1971. British Library General Reference Collection L.R.413.l.21.
- William Blake, Tate Gallery little book series, Tate Gallery, 1966. British Library General Reference Collection X419/2657
- William Blake, Tate Gallery, 1978. British Library General Reference Collection BS.4/193
- William Blake in the Collection of the National Gallery of Victoria (with Ted Gott and Irena Zdanowicz), The Gallery, 1989. British Library General Reference Collection YA.!999.b.1935
- The Paintings and Drawings of William Blake, New Haven, 1981. British Library General Reference Collection LR410.cc.7/26
- On the Morning of Christ's Nativity: Milton's Hymn with Illustrations by William Blake with note on the illustrations by Martin Butlin, Whittington Press & Angscot Productions,1981. British Library General Reference Collection Cup.510.dga.30

=== Works on J.M.W. Turner ===
- The Paintings of J. M. W. Turner (with Evelyn Joll), Yale University Press, 1977. British Library General Reference Collection LR.410.cc.7/17
- Turner Watercolours with an Introduction by Martin Butlin, Barrie and Jenkins, 1975. British Library General Reference Collection L.R.407.a.4.
- Turner (with Sir John Rothenstein), Heinemann, 1965. British Library General Reference Document Supply fL71/1256
- The Paintings of J. M. W. Turner (with Evelyn Joll), Tate Gallery, 1977. British Library General Reference Collection LR.410.cc.7/17
- The Later Works of J. M. W. Turner, Tate Gallery, 1965. British Library General Reference Collection X.429/1086
- Turner at Petworth: Painter and Patron (with Mollie Luther and Ian Warrell), Tate Gallery, 1989. British Library General Reference Collection LB.31.4330
- The Oxford Companion to J. M. W. Turner (ed. with Evelyn Joll and Luke Herrmann), Indiana University Press, 2001. British Library General Reference Collection YC.2001.b.294

=== Other works ===
- Samuel Palmer’s Sketchbook of 1824, Introduction and Commentary by Martin Butlin, Trianon Press,1962. British Library General Reference Collection Document Supply X23/7786
- The Modern British Paintings, Drawings and Sculpture (with Mary Chamot and Dennis Farr), Tate Gallery Catalogue, 1964. British Library General Reference Collection X.421/5754
- The Blake-Varley Sketchbook of 1819 in the collection of M.D.E. Clayton-Stamm, Heinemann, 1969. British Library General Reference Collection X.429/4208
- Aspects of British Painting 1550–1800, from the Collection of the Sarah Campbell Blaffer Foundation (exhibition catalogue), Sarah Campbell Blaffer Foundation, 1988. British Library General Reference Section Document Supply 88/26876
