= Emil John Mihalik =

His Grace Emil John Mihalik
- Bishop of Parma for the Byzantines

Orders
- Ordination: September 21, 1945
- Consecration: June 12, 1969

Personal details
- Born: February 7, 1920 Pittsburgh, Pennsylvania
- Died: January 27, 1984 (aged 63) Cleveland, Ohio

Styles of Emil John Mihalik
- Reference style: The Most Reverend
- Spoken style: Your Grace
- Religious style: His Grace

Emil John Mihalik (February 7, 1920 – January 27, 1984) was the first eparch of the Byzantine Catholic Eparchy of Parma, Ohio. His appointment occurred simultaneously with the erection of the see. At that time, his jurisdiction encompassed central and western Ohio, Arizona, California, Colorado, Indiana, Michigan, Illinois, Wisconsin, Minnesota, Missouri, Iowa, Kansas, Montana, Nevada, New Mexico, Nebraska, North Dakota, South Dakota, Oregon, Utah, Washington, Wyoming, Alaska and Hawaii.

== Early life ==
Emil John Mihalik was born in Pittsburgh, Pennsylvania. He attended high school in Brentwood, Pennsylvania, and received his undergraduate degree from St. Procopius College.

== Pastoral appointments ==
As many Eastern Catholic seminarians of his time, Mihalik attended a Roman Rite seminary, but was ordained to the Byzantine Catholic priesthood on September 21, 1945, at St. Mary's Church in Trenton, New Jersey, by Bishop Basil Takach.

He was pastor at St. Thomas Church in Rahway, New Jersey, from February 1, 1961, until June 12, 1969, and the Eparchy of Passaic's chancellor.

== Eparch of Parma ==
On February 21, 1969, Pope Paul VI created the Eparchy of Parma. Archbishop Luigi Raimondi, the Apostolic Delegate to the United States, announced its creation and Father Mihalik's appointment effective March 22, 1969.

Mihalik was consecrated as the eparch on June 12, 1969, with Archbishop Stephen Kocisko as his principal consecrator. His principal co-consecrators were Bishops Michael Dudick and Michael Rusnak.

On September 6, 1970, during the 36th annual pilgrimage that drew approximately 45,000 people to Mount Saint Macrina, Mihalik, Kocisko, and Dudick blessed a cornerstone for a 50-bed nursing home.

In May 1977, Bishop Alden Bell of the Diocese of Sacramento gave $20,000, which had been a World War II relief fund for Slovaks, to Mihalik. The eparch said the money would be used to build a church in Sacramento. At the time, all the western US states including Alaska and Hawaii were part of the eparchy.

== Final years ==
Mihalik died in Cleveland, Ohio, on January 27, 1984, shortly before his 64th birthday, leaving the See sede vacante. He died of lung cancer. His vicar general, Monsignor Andrew Vaida, was named as diocesan administrator.

== Legacy ==
During his priesthood, Mihalik is credited with the establishment of 18 parishes and ordaining 23 priests.

== Notes ==
Catholic Church titles
Preceded by Founding Eparch	Eparch of Parma; March 24, 1969–January 24, 1984	Succeeded by Andrew Pataki
