= Thyatira (titular see) =

Catholic titular see

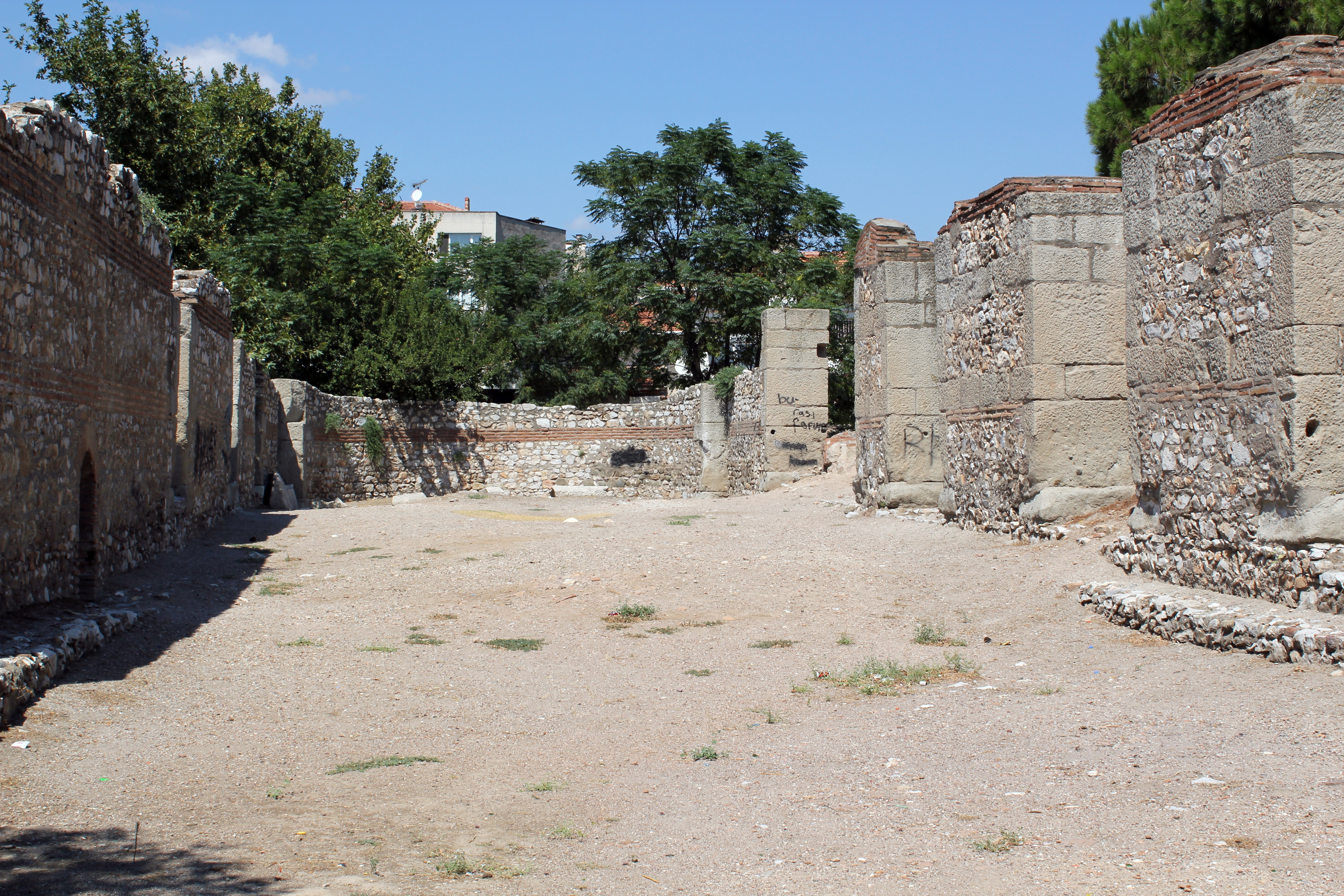
Ruins of the Basilica of Thyatira

Bishopric of Thyatira (Italian: Tiatira) is a titular see of the Catholic Church centered on the ancient Roman city of Thyatira in Asia Minor.

The bishopric of Thyatira stretched back to very early Christianity. Christianity came to the region in the mid 1st century with Paul the Apostle on his third missionary journey around 54AD, when he stayed for three years in nearby Ephesus. Timothy, Onesimus and John were all active in the area and the Christian community here was addressed by letter of John as it is one of the Seven churches of Revelation.

The diocese was in the ecclesiastical province of Sardis.

By the 3rd century, almost the entire town was Christian in religion but a stronghold of the Montanist sect.

== Known bishops ==
Ancient bishops of Thyatira
Name	Position	From	To
*Carpus		c. 155	c. 165
Serras c. 258			
Sarapas	Attended first Council of Nicaea	fl. 325	
Phoscus	attended Council of Chalcedon	fl. 451	
Esaias a presbyter	attended Second Council of Nicaea	fl. 787	

Titular Bishops of Thyatira
Name	Position	From	To
Pantaleon Bruns OSB	Auxiliary Bishop in Paderborn, Holy Roman Empire	20 Jan 1721	15 December 1727
Stephanus Ladislaus Luzenszky		7 September 1729	1734
Bartolomeo Gradenigo	Coadjutor archbishop of Udine, Republic of Venice	24 August 1734	13 March 1762
Thomas Johann Kaspar von Thun und Hohenstein	Auxiliary Bishop in Passau, Holy Roman Empire	16 December 1776	4 November 1795
Jacobus Ludovicus O'Donnell OFM	Apostolic Vicar of Newfoundland	5 January 1796	1 April 1811
Unknown Greek bishop in 1810			
Giuseppe del Prete Belmonte		28 September 1855	
Charles Menzies Gordon SJ	Apostolic Vicar of Jamaica	28 May 1889	16 November 1911
Peter Joseph Lausberg	Auxiliary Bishop in Cologne, Germany	1 May 1914	30 August 1922
Kazimieras Mikalojus Michalkiewicz	Auxiliary Bishop in Vilnius, Lithuania	13 January 1923	16 February 1940
Heinrich Metzroth	Auxiliary Bishop in Trier, Germany	12 May 1941	19 January 1951
Imre Szabó	Auxiliary Bishop in Esztergom, Hungary	11 March 1951	21 May 1976
Thomas Victor Dolinay	Auxiliary Bishop in Passaic, United States	28 June 1976	3 December 1981
Myron Michael Daciuk OSBM	Auxiliary Bishop in Winnipeg, Canada	24 June 1982	28 October 1991

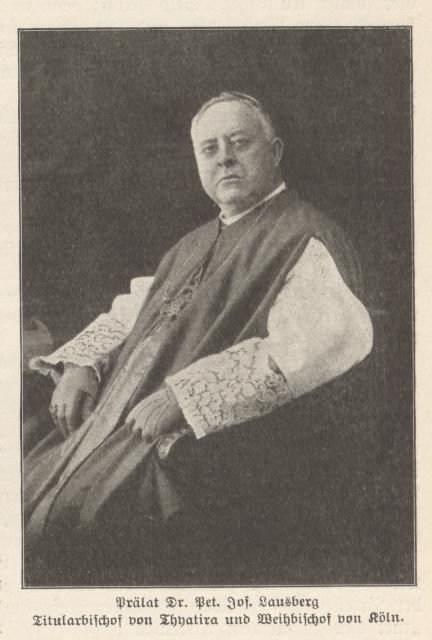
Peter Joseph Lausberg

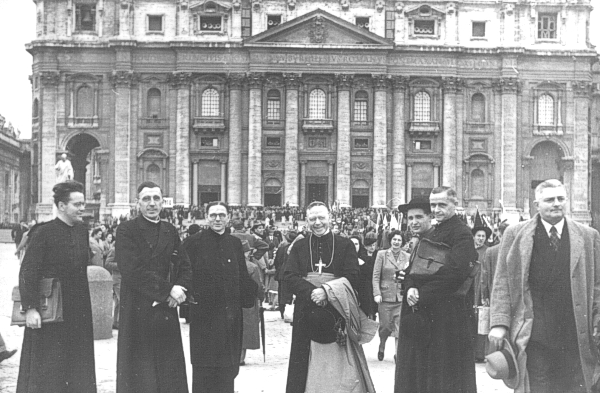
Weihbischof Heinrich Metzroth Rom

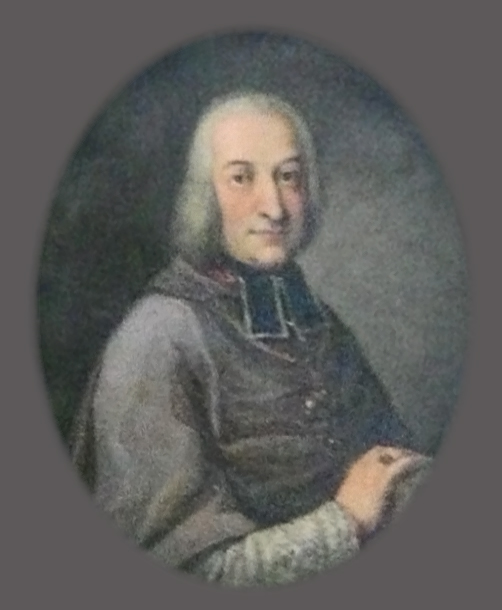
Thomas Johann von Thun und Hohenstein

=== List of archbishops of Thyateira and Great Britain ===
- Germanos Strenopoulos (1922–1951)
- Athenagoras Kavadas (1951–1962)
- Athenagoras Kokkinakis (1963–1979)
- Methodios Fouyias (1979–1988)
- Gregorios Theocharous (from 1988)

== See also ==
- Greek Orthodox Archdiocese of Thyateira and Great Britain
