= Byzantine Discalced Carmelites =

Communities of Discalced Carmelites operating in Eastern Catholic Churches

The Byzantine Discalced Carmelites are communities of Discalced Carmelites that operate in several Eastern Catholic Churches, namely the Bulgarian Byzantine Catholic Church, the Melkite Greek Catholic Church, the Ruthenian Greek Catholic Church, the Ordinariate for Eastern Catholics in France and the Romanian Greek Catholic Church.

== Around the world ==
=== Bulgaria ===
Discalced Carmelite friars are resident in Bulgaria.

=== Lebanon ===
The Carmel of the Mother of God and Unity in Harissa, Lebanon was inaugurated on 24 August 1962 by Mgr Philip Nabaa (1907-1967), the Melkite Metropolitan Archbishop of Beirut and Byblos (1948-1967). Due to the many vocations a second Carmel was founded on 9 July 2005 in Kfarmasshoun, near Byblos. The Carmel of the Mother of God and Unity in Harissa was visited by Pope John Paul II on 11 May 1997 and by Pope Benedict XVI on 16 September 2012 during their apostolic trips to Lebanon.

==== Icon of Our Lady of Mount Carmel (Harissa) ====
The icon of Our Lady of Mount Carmel, also known as the Virgin of Contemplation, is a contemporary work of Byzantine inspiration, created by the Discalced Carmelite Sisters of the Byzantine Rite Monastery in Harissa, Lebanon. It is currently housed in the Discalced Carmelite monastery in the Desierto de las Palmas region of Spain.

Unlike traditional Western representations, this icon was painted according to the canons of Eastern iconography, reflecting a deep integration between Carmelite spirituality and the Byzantine Christian tradition. Its creation is the fruit of monastic prayer and contemplation.

The iconography of the Virgin of Mount Carmel has its origins in the 13th century, when the first Latin Carmelite hermits settled on Mount Carmel in the Holy Land. It is likely that the first chapel built by these hermits already included an Eastern icon of the Mother of God, similar to other local shrines. Historical works such as the Kyriotissa icon of Nicosia, the Bruna icon of Naples, and the Virgin of Carmel in Florence directly influenced the conception of the contemporary image.

The icon's composition presents Mary in a prayerful attitude (orans), with the Child Jesus in a medallion on her chest, in the Byzantine Platytera style. She wears the brown habit of the Carmelite Order and is positioned on a cloud, a Carmelite symbol associated with the vision of the prophet Elijah. Additional elements, such as the grotto with the cross and the solitary tree in the desert, evoke the Carmelite hermitage and the interior life cultivated in contemplation. The golden background emphasizes the sacred and timeless character of the scene.

=== France ===
In 1964, the Second Vatican Council's Decree on Ecumenism received an enthusiastic welcome in the Carmel of Nancy; then, with the agreement of the community, the Prioress, Mother Elisabeth, considered founding an Eastern-rite Carmel. Little by little, the details of the project were worked out; it was encouraged by the Superiors of the Order and received Pope Paul VI's blessing. After friendly consultations with several representatives of the Orthodox Church in France, a statute approved by the Bishop allowed the Sisters who were committed to the project to pray the Byzantine-rite Office. In 1971, this "Eastern branch" transferred to the Carmel in Nogent-sur-Marne, close to Paris, enabling the Sisters to become better acquainted with Orthodox Christianity and to be trained in iconography.

With the authorisation of the Bishops of Nancy and Dijon, a monastery dedicated to St. Elijah was founded in Saint Remy (Côte d'Or) in 1974 by four Carmelites from Nancy.

In 1981, after the five year review of the project, the review commission authorized the opening of a novitiate. In 1986, the Monastery was established as a Carmel of the Byzantine Rite under the jurisdiction of the Ordinariate for Eastern Catholics in France, which delegates its authority to the Bishop of Dijon, making it the fourth Byzantine-rite Carmel in existence, after Sofia (Bulgaria), Harissa (Lebanon) and Sugarloaf (Pennsylvania).

=== Romania ===
In response to an invitation from the Greek Catholic Metropolitan in Romania, Mgr Lucian Muresan, on 14 September 1994, the feast of the Triumph of the Cross, the Monastery of St. Elijah laid the foundations of a skete in Stânceni, a village set in the Carpathian Mountains. The Skete is dedicated to the Holy Cross which unites all Christians as they await the resurrection. Situated on the outskirts of a village whose inhabitants are Orthodox, Catholic or Protestant, it is a place of prayer for Unity.

=== United States ===
Holy Annunciation Monastery in Sugarloaf, Pennsylvania is overseen by the Eparchy of Passaic in New Jersey; originally established as a Byzantine Rite Carmelite community, these nuns now follow the Rule of Saint Benedict.

Holy Annunciation Carmel's founding sisters, Mother Marija of the Holy Spirit, Sister Marie Helen of the Cross and Sister Ann of the Trinity (d. 2001) set up the monastery at Sugarloaf in 1977. Father Walter Ciszek, S.J., guided the sisters in the establishment of this new foundation and introduced the community to the Most Reverend Michael Dudick, the bishop of the Ruthenians of Passaic, who assisted the community for years.

"Divine providence directed us to the Ruthenian people and their diocese of Passaic NJ, which stems from the Uzhgorod-Mukachevo eparchy in Transcarpathia (now Ukraine). At the time of founding Holy Annunciation, Communism was in full force and daily we prayed for "our suffering brethren" (behind the iron curtain). As Communism weakened and then collapsed (1989-1990) we received requests, even applications, from young women in Byzantine Slovakia and Carpathia who felt they had a Carmelite vocation. Several Byzantine rite girls came to us from Slovakia and Carpathia. We in turn promised, when feasible, that a foundation would be made in their homeland. This has been our endeavor since 1995, and in 2002 we sent Sisters there to begin the Monastery of St. Therese in Koritnyani, Transcarpathia." - Mother Marija

In 1999, the community, through an unusual chain of events, accepted five young women of the South Indian Syro-Malabar Catholic Church as members. These sisters comprise one third of the community. Bishop Dudick encouraged the assistance of sister Eastern Catholic Churches.

The Monastery breeds and sells horses, as well as running a bakery.

== See also ==
- Byzantine Catholic Eparchy of Passaic
