= John Rothenstein =

British arts administrator and art historian

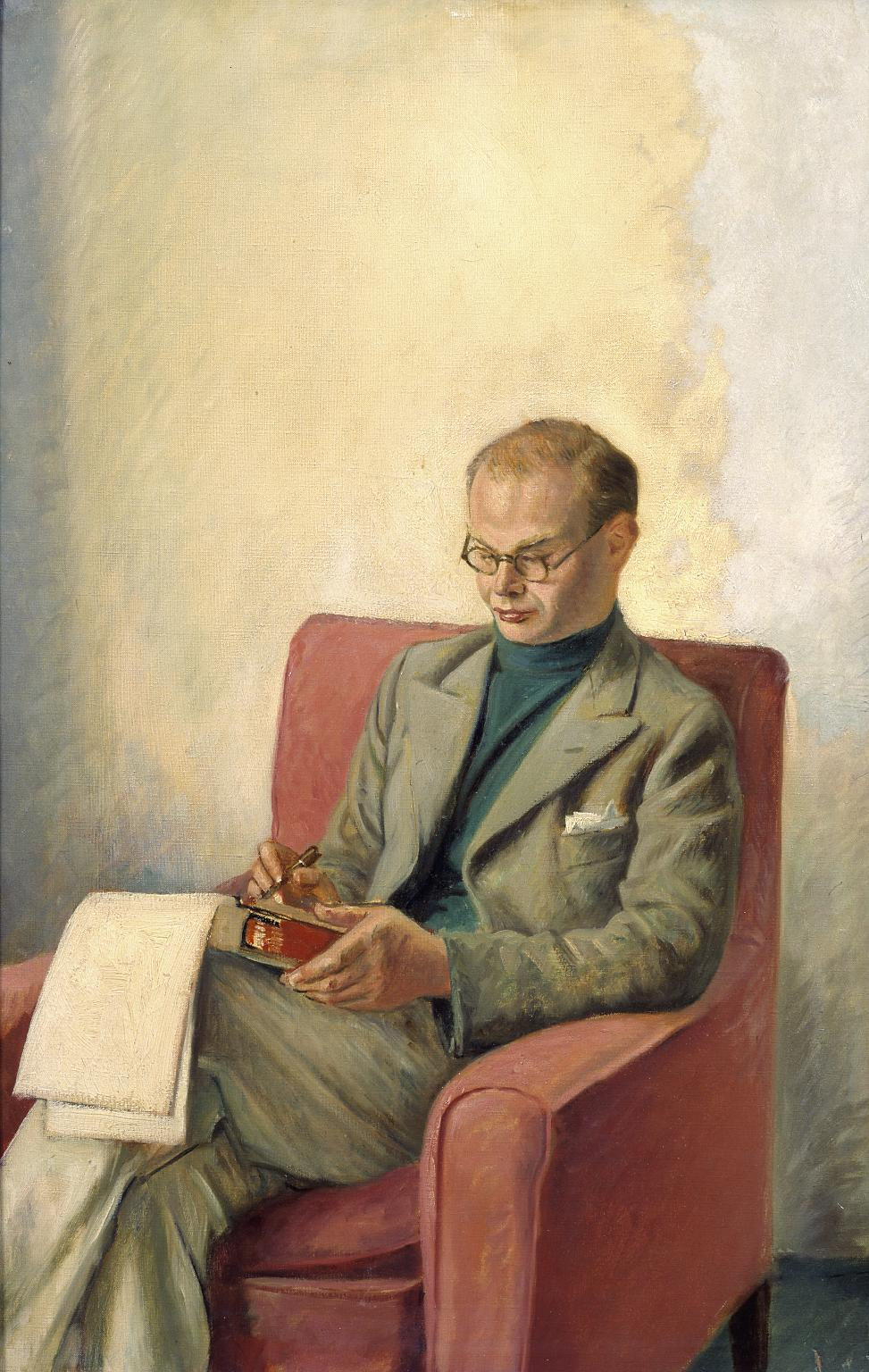
Portrait of Sir John Rothenstein C.B.E. 1938 by Sir William Rothenstein 1872–1945. Presented by Lady Dynevor through the Friends of the Tate Gallery 1974.

Sir John Knewstub Maurice Rothenstein CBE (11 July 1901 – 27 February 1992) was a British arts administrator and art historian.

== Biography ==
John Rothenstein was born in London in 1901, the son of Sir William Rothenstein. The family was connected to the Bloomsbury Set. John Rothenstein attended Bedales School, studied at Worcester College, Oxford, and became friends with T. E. Lawrence. He shared rooms with novelist William Gerhardie.

After serving as Director of Leeds City Art Gallery, he was appointed Director of Sheffield City Art Galleries (1933–38) where he oversaw the establishment and opening of the Graves Art Gallery. From 1938–64 Rothenstein was Director of the Tate Gallery in London. His father had been a trustee of the Tate up until a few years before and there were hints of nepotism in the appointment, especially as his father had telephoned the Chairman of the trustees in advance of Rothenstein's job interview.

Rothenstein's directorship — the longest to date — was one of the most successful. Notably under his directorship, he worked closely with Mary Chamot, the Tate's first woman curator. The Tate's annual purchase fund could not compete with those of US institutions, so few works of modern foreign art were added to the collection. However, he wrote, "Picasso is a Proteus, the prodigiously gifted master of all styles and media".

According to Richard Cork, one of Rothenstein's errors was failing to purchase Henri Matisse's The Red Studio when it was offered to the Tate Gallery for a few hundred pounds in 1941.

Art historian Douglas Cooper began an open campaign to have Rothenstein dismissed by the trustees, which led to an incident in which Rothenstein punched Cooper in the face in 1954, knocking his glasses off.

Rothenstein documented the lives of all the major (and many still overlooked) British artists in his Modern English Painters, which has earned him the title of 'The Vasari of British Art' (like Vasari's pioneering Lives, it was revised and reprinted during the author's lifetime).

The Tate began hosting temporary exhibitions during this period, organised by the Arts Council of Great Britain, including the major 1960 retrospective of Picasso. Rothenstein acquired such contemporary works as R.B. Kitaj's Isaac Babel Riding with Budyonny from the artist's first major show at Marlborough Fine Art in 1963. In 1964 he retired from the Tate to Oxfordshire where he wrote three volumes of autobiography.

An annual lecture named in his honour now takes place at Tate Britain.

== Honours ==
Rothenstein was appointed Commander of the Order of the British Empire (CBE) in the 1948 King's Birthday Honours, and knighted in the 1952 New Year Honours.

On 19 February 1965 he was installed as the Rector of the University of St Andrews and received an honorary Doctor of Laws.

== Selected works ==
- The Artists of the 1890's (1928) George Routledge & Sons Ltd. London
- Nineteenth Century Painting: A Study in Conflict (1932) John Lane, The Bodley Head. London
- The Life and Death of Conder (1938) J. M. Dent & Sons Ltd. London
- Modern English Painters (3 vols., 1952–74)
- The Tate Gallery, 'The World of Art Library' series. Thames & Hudson (1962)
- Autobiography: Summer's Lease, 1901-1938 (1965); Bright Day, Hideous Night, 1939-1965 (1966)

Cultural offices
Preceded by J.B. Manson	Director of the Tate Gallery; 1938–1964	Succeeded by Norman Reid
Academic offices
Preceded by C. P. Snow	Rector of the University of St Andrews; 1964–1967	Succeeded by Learie Nicholas Constantine, Baron Constantine, Kt.
