= Norman Reid (museum director) =

British museum director & painter (1915–2007)

Norman Reid

Sir Norman Robert Reid (27 December 1915 – 17 December 2007) was an arts administrator and painter. He served as the director of the Tate Gallery from 1964 to 1979.

== Early life ==
Norman Reid was born in Dulwich, London, and was the son of Edward Daniel Reid, a shoemaker. He was educated at Wilson's Grammar School and won a scholarship to the Edinburgh College of Art, where he studied in the late 1930s and was taught by William Gillies. Later, Reid received a degree in English at Edinburgh University. Reid enlisted in 1939 in the Argyll and Sutherland Highlanders at the start of Second World War. He was commissioned as a second lieutenant in the same regiment on 2 August 1941. He transferred to the Royal Artillery on 1 November 1941, and later served in Italy. He left the Army in 1946 with the rank of major. In 1941, Reid married Jean Lindsay Bertram, whom he met while they were students at the Edinburgh College of Art.

== Tate gallery ==
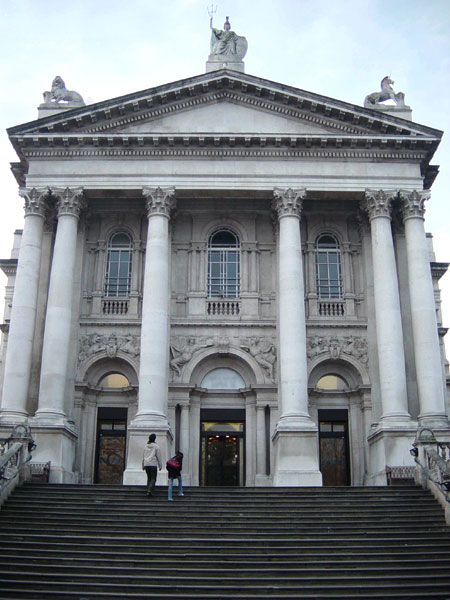
The Tate Gallery, now Tate Britain

Reid joined the Tate Gallery in 1946 having heard that it was understaffed, and became the right-hand man of the then director, John Rothenstein, becoming deputy director in 1954 and keeper in 1959. He was appointed director when Rothenstein retired in 1964.

A much-needed expansion of the gallery, the 'North East Quadrant', was built in 1979 during Reid's directorship, vastly increasing the Tate's exhibition space. Reid also strengthened the collection, especially in the area of early twentieth-century European art, acquiring outstanding works by artists including Pablo Picasso, Giacometti, Henri Matisse, Constantin Brâncuși, Piet Mondrian, and Salvador Dalí. During Reid's Directorship the Tate staged a number of ground-breaking exhibitions, including an early presentation of Gilbert and George's Living Statues.

In 1972, the Tate purchased Equivalent VIII, a 1966 work by American sculptor Carl Andre which consisted of a stack of 120 ready-made fire bricks. When a journalist discovered the sculpture listed in the Tate's Biennial Report of 1972–74 the matter was picked up by numerous British newspapers, with the subsequent hostility causing great embarrassment to Reid, who defended the purchase and the curators who had made it. However, the case dogged Reid for the rest of his period as director.

Reid also increased the Tate's earlier collections, launching a successful fund-raising drive in 1977 to acquire Haymakers and Reapers by George Stubbs.

The strong personal relationships he forged with artists (he himself had trained as a painter), also led to important works being donated to the Gallery. Mark Rothko's Seagram murals and work by Barbara Hepworth (Reid later acted as one of her executors), Ben Nicholson, Naum Gabo and Henry Moore were all gifted to the Tate largely as a result of the personal respect the artists had for Reid. He established the gallery's conservation department, the Exhibitions and Education department, and was involved in founding the Friends of the Tate, the American Friends of the Tate, and the Paintings in Hospitals charity. Reid is widely regarded as the foremost of the Tate's Directors, having developed the gallery into "an international museum of the first rank".

== Honours and awards ==
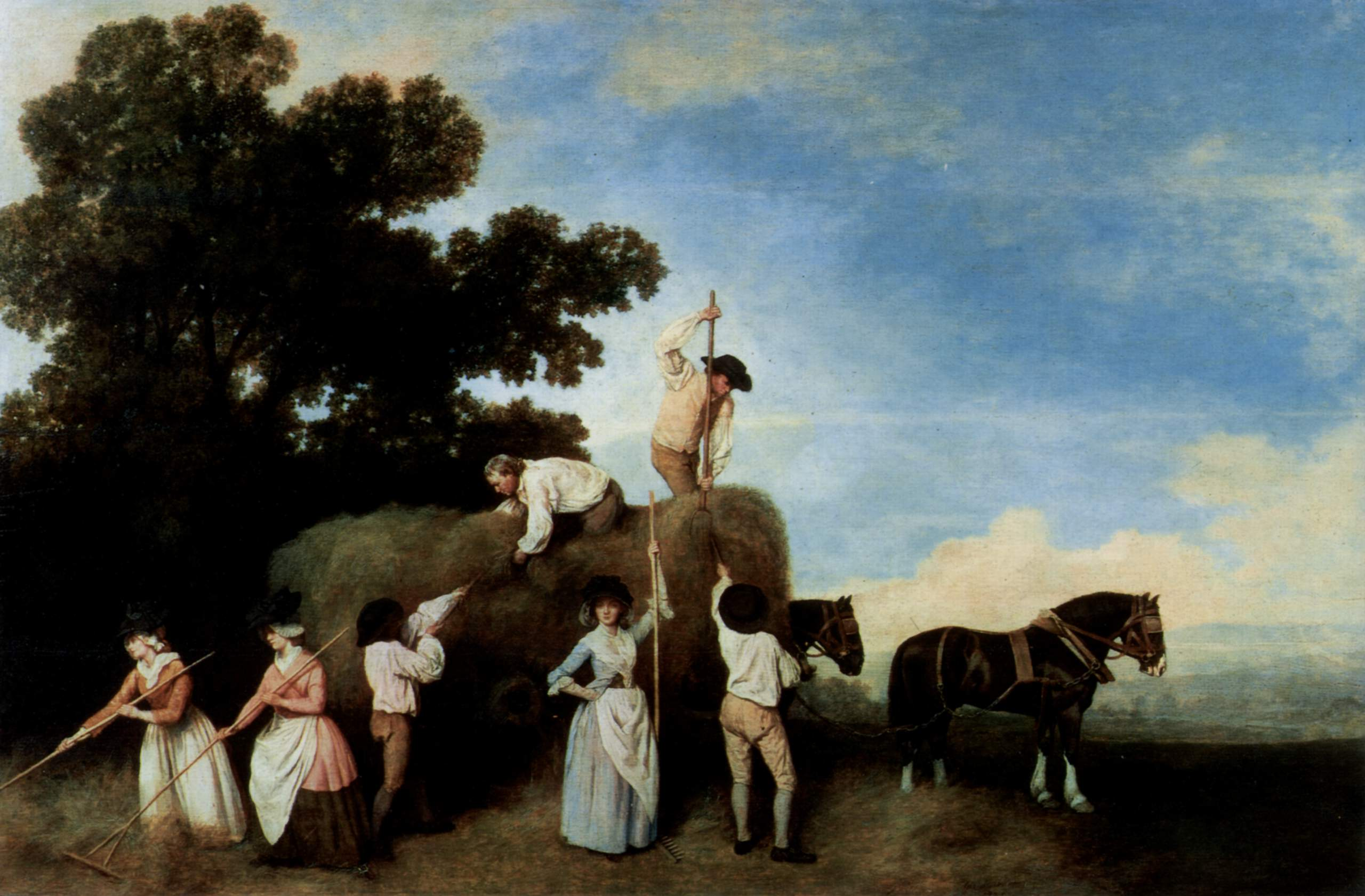
Reid's 1977 fund-raising acquired George Stubbs' Haymakers for the Tate.

Reid was an active member of the conservation committees of the International Council of Museums (ICOM), and worked to encourage young conservators as this new profession emerged. Reid served on numerous advisory bodies and committees. He was Secretary-General of the International Institute for Conservation from 1963 to 1965 and a vice-president from 1966 to 1980. He served as the British representative on the Committee on Museums and Galleries of Modern Art (1963–1979), and was a member of the Arts Council of Great Britain Art Panel (1964–1974) and of the Institute of Contemporary Arts Advisory Panel from 1965.

He was also on the Contemporary Art Society Committee from 1965 to 1977, and served for 12 years on the British Council Fine Arts Committee, acting as its chairman from 1968 to 1975. He was a member of the Paul Mellon Centre's advisory council (1971–1978), and was a trustee of the Graham and Kathleen Sutherland Foundation from 1980 to 1985.

He was awarded various honorary degrees and orders, while his own paintings are exhibited in the Scottish Gallery of Modern Art.

Reid was knighted in the 1970 Queen's Birthday Honours, and died in London aged 91.

== Publications ==
His publications include:

- Gabo Naum, 1890–1977 by Jorn Mekert and Sir Norman Reid, Annely Juda Fine Art, 1990. ISBN 1-870280-22-9

== Notes and references ==
- Obituary—Sir Norman Reid—Brilliant director of the Tate Gallery who expanded the national collections of modern and historic British art, The Guardian, 2007-12-19. Retrieved on 2008-10-08

Cultural offices
Preceded by John Rothenstein	Director of the Tate Gallery; 1964–1979	Succeeded by Alan Bowness
