= Metropolis of Pittsburgh (Ruthenian Greek Catholic Church) =

Metropolitan province for Byzantine Rite Catholics in the North America

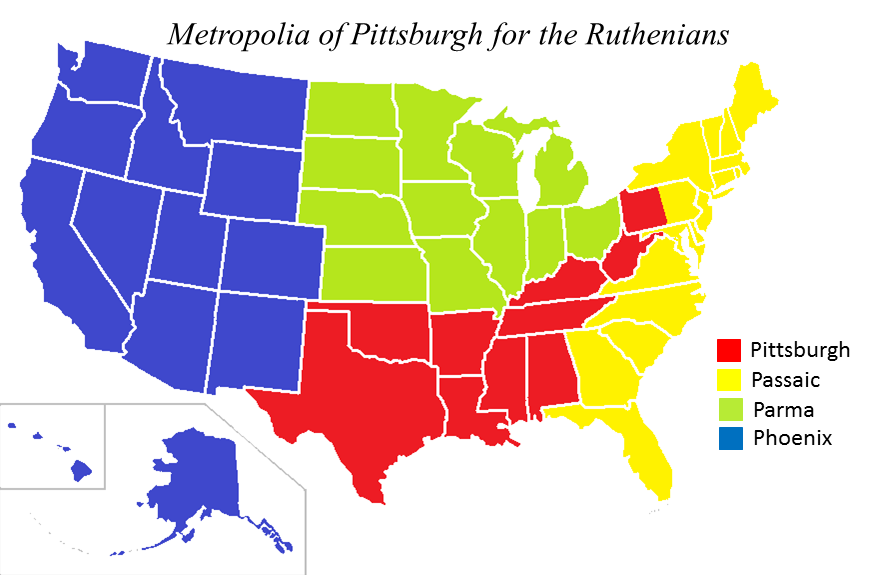
Eparchies of the Byzantine Catholic Metropolis of Pittsburgh

The Metropolis of Pittsburgh is a sui juris metropolitan see of the Ruthenian Greek Catholic Church that is located in the United States of America and Canada. The Ruthenian Greek Catholic Church is one of 23 sui juris ('self governing') Eastern Catholic particular churches in the Catholic Church that is in full communion with the Holy See. The metropolis uses the Byzantine Rite in its liturgies. It was erected as a metropolis (archdiocese) by Pope Paul VI in 1969. The metropolis has jurisdiction over those communities that originated (in terms of their ancestry) from the regions of Carpathian Ruthenia, Slovakia, Hungary and the former Yugoslavia. Worshipers come from several Byzantine Catholic groups: Rusyn Americans, Slovak Americans, Hungarian Americans, and Croatian Americans. In 2022, governance of the Exarchate of Saints Cyril and Methodius of Toronto in Canada passed to the metropolis of Pittsburgh from the Slovak Greek Catholic Church.

The Ruthenian Greek Catholic Church does not have a unified organization.

== Organization ==
The canonical territories of the Metropolitan Province are:

- Archeparchy of Pittsburgh

Established in 1924
(60,200 faithful, 84 parishes, 83 priests)

- Eparchy of Parma

Established 1969
(12,401 faithful, 37 parishes, 38 priests)

- Eparchy of Passaic

Established 1963
(24,031 faithful, 89 parishes, 84 priests)

- Eparchy of Phoenix

Established 1981 at Van Nuys, transferred in 2010 to Phoenix
(2,849 faithful, 19 parishes, 25 priests)

- Exarchate of Saints Cyril and Methodius of Toronto in Canada

In 2022, the exarchate was transferred to the metropolis from the Slovak Greek Catholic Church
(4,800 faithful, 4 parishes).

Although Rusyn Americans constitute the majority of members of the metropolis, the Church has ordinary jurisdiction over the faithful of certain Churches within the Slavic Tradition of the Byzantine Rite that do not have an established hierarchy in the United States, specifically those of the Hungarian, Slovak, and Croatian Greek-Catholic Churches.

When the Ruthenian Catholic Church in Europe was under atheistic Communist rule, and because of persecution, unable to organize publicly, the impossibility of regular communication with it meant that the distant American Metropolia, unable to be treated as a normal metropolia of an Eastern Rite Catholic Church (canons 133–139 of the Code of Canons of the Eastern Churches), has been treated as a sui iuris Metropolitan Church (canons 155–173 of the Code of Canons of the Eastern Churches). The Holy See's Annuario Pontificio has, however, always listed it not as a separate particular Church but as a Metropolia of the Ruthenian Church.

== History ==
In 1924, an Apostolic Exarchate was created for the Ruthenian-Rite Catholics in the USA, with ancestry from the regions of Carpathian Ruthenia and other parts of the former Kingdom of Hungary. In 1963, the Apostolic Exarchate was divided in two parts, each transformed into a diocese (eparchy): one centered in Pittsburgh and the other in Passaic. Both remained under direct jurisdiction of the pope, and were officially defined as observing the Ruthenian Rite.

=== Ruthenian Catholic Metropolis of Munhall ===
In 1969, the Eparchy of Pittsburgh was raised in rank and renamed as the Archeparchy of Munhall, and in the same time a metropolitan province was created and named the Ruthenian Catholic Metropolis of Munhall, encompassing also the Eparchy of Passaic and the newly created Eparchy of Parma. The new Metropolis and all of its eparchies were officially defined as observing the Ruthenian Rite.

=== Byzantine Catholic Metropolis of Pittsburgh ===
In 1977, the Archeparchy and the Metropolis were renamed and redefined from Munhall of the Ruthenians to Pittsburgh of the Byzantines, and thus continued as the Byzantine Catholic Metropolis of Pittsburgh. In 1981, the Eparchy of Van Nuys was created and officially defined as observing the Byzantine Rite. In 2009, its seat was moved from Van Nuys to Phoenix, and its name was changed to the Eparchy of Phoenix.

In January 2007, Metropolitan Basil Schott, Archbishop of Pittsburgh promulgated a major revision of two of the major Divine Liturgies (Chrysostom and Basil) of the Byzantine Catholic Church.

== Seminary ==
The church's Byzantine Catholic Seminary of SS. Cyril and Methodius, established in 1950, is located on Pittsburgh, Pennsylvania's Observatory Hill. In addition to the training of priests, it offers a program in Deacon Formation as well as a Cantor's Institute.

== List of Bishops and Apostolic Administrators ==
- Gabriel Martyak (1916–1924) (Apostolic Administrator)
- Basil Takach (June 15, 1924 – May 13, 1948)
- Daniel Ivancho (May 13, 1948 – December 12, 1954)
- Nicholas Elko (February 5, 1955 – December 22, 1967)
- Edward V. Rosack (July 3, 1967 - December 22, 1967) (Apostolic Administrator)
- Stephen Kocisko (March 5, 1968 – June 12, 1991)
- Thomas Dolinay (June 12, 1991 – April 13, 1993)
- Michael Dudick (April 1993 - February 1995) (Administrator of the Metropolitan Church of Pittsburgh)
- John Bilock (April 20, 1993 – September 8, 1994) (Apostolic Administrator - Archeparchy of Pittsburgh)
- Russell Duker (September 1994 – November 15, 1994) (Apostolic Administrator - Archeparchy of Pittsburgh)
- Judson Procyk (February 7, 1995 – April 15, 2001)
- Andrew Pataki (April 2001 - June 2002) (Administrator of the Metropolitan Church of Pittsburgh)
- John Kudrick (May 2001 – July 9, 2002) (Apostolic Administrator - Archeparchy of Pittsburgh)
- Basil Schott (July 9, 2002 – June 10, 2010)
- William Skurla (June 10, 2010 – April 18, 2012) (Administrator of the Metropolitan Church of Pittsburgh)
- Eugene Yackanich (June 2010 – April 18, 2012) (Apostolic Administrator - Archeparchy of Pittsburgh)
- William C. Skurla (April 18, 2012 – present)

== See also ==
- List of the Catholic bishops of the United States#Metropolia of Pittsburgh for the Ruthenians
- Slovak Greek Catholic Church
- Basil Shereghy
- St. John the Baptist Byzantine Catholic Cathedral (Pittsburgh)
- St. John Chrysostom Byzantine Catholic Church (Pittsburgh)
- Mount Saint Macrina

== Sources ==
- Bransom, Charles N. (1990). Ordinations of U.S. Catholic Bishops, 1790-1989: A Chronological List. Washington: National Conference of Catholic Bishops. ISBN 9781555863234.
- Byzantine Catholic Church of Pittsburgh (1999). Byzantine-Ruthenian Metropolitan Church of Pittsburgh: Directory. Oakdale: Knepper Press.
- Dyrud, Keith P. (1992). The Quest for the Rusyn Soul: The Politics of Religion and Culture in Eastern Europe and in America, 1890-World War I. Philadelphia: Balch Institute Press. ISBN 9780944190104.
- Marti, Federico (2009). I rutheni negli Stati Uniti: Santa Sede e mobilità umana tra Ottocento e Novecento. Milano: Giuffrè. ISBN 9788814145902.
- Magocsi, Paul R.; Pop, Ivan I., eds. (2005) [2002]. Encyclopedia of Rusyn History and Culture (2. rev. ed.). Toronto: University of Toronto Press.
- Magocsi, Paul R. (2015). With Their Backs to the Mountains: A History of Carpathian Rus' and Carpatho-Rusyns. Budapest-New York: Central European University Press. ISBN 9786155053467.
- Procko, Bohdan P. (1973). "Soter Ortynsky: First Ruthenian Bishop in the United States, 1907-1916". The Catholic Historical Review. 58 (4): 513–533. JSTOR 25019169.
- Shipman, Andrew J. (1912a). "Ruthenian Rite". The Catholic Encyclopedia. Vol. 13. New York: Robert Appleton Company. pp. 276–277.
- Shipman, Andrew J. (1912b). "Ruthenians". The Catholic Encyclopedia. Vol. 13. New York: Robert Appleton Company. pp. 277–279.
- Slivka, John (1973). Correct nomenclature: Greek rite or Byzantine rite: Rusin or Ruthenian: Rusin or Slovak?. Brooklyn, N.Y.
- Slivka, John (1978). Historical Mirror: Sources of the Rusin and Hungarian Greek Rite Catholics in the United States of America, 1884-1963. Brooklyn, N.Y.
- Slivka, John (1989) [1977]. Who are we? Nationality: Rusin, Russian, Ruthenian, Slovak? Ecclesiastical name: Greek Rite Catholic, Byzantine Rite Catholic? (2. ed.). Brooklyn, N.Y.
- Warzeski, Walter C. (1971). Byzantine rite Rusins in Carpatho-Ruthenia and America. Pittsburgh: Byzantine Seminary Press.
