= Byzantine Catholic Archeparchy of Pittsburgh =

Eastern Catholic archeparchy in the United States

Byzantine Catholic Archeparchy of Pittsburgh Archieparchia Pittsburgensis Ritus Byzantini
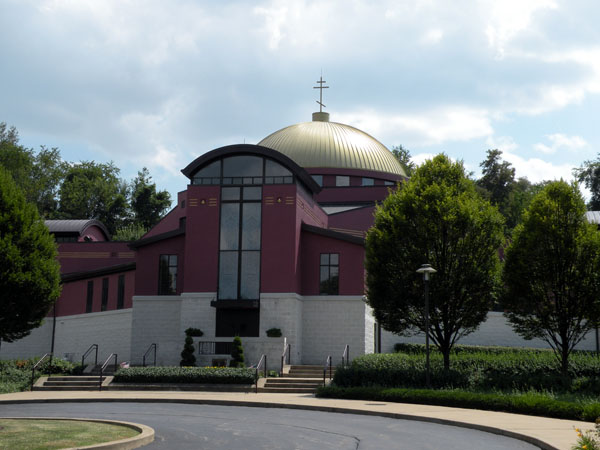
- St. John the Baptist Byzantine Catholic Cathedral

- Logo

Location
- Country: United States
- Ecclesiastical province: Metropolis of Pittsburgh

Statistics
- Population: Total: (as of 2009); 58,997
- Parishes: 79

Information
- Denomination: Catholic Church
- Sui iuris church: Ruthenian Greek Catholic Church
- Rite: Byzantine Rite
- Established: May 8, 1924 (102 years ago)
- Cathedral: St. John the Baptist Byzantine Catholic Cathedral

Current leadership
- Pope: Leo XIV
- Metropolitan Archbishop: William C. Skurla; Metropolitan of Pittsburgh

Map
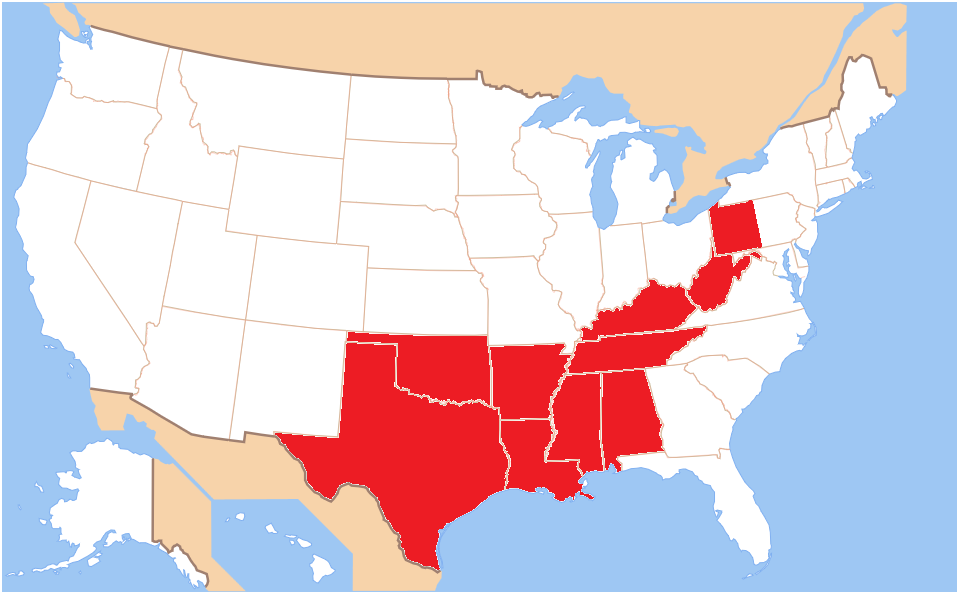

Website
- archpitt.org

The Archeparchy of Pittsburgh (Latin: Archieparchia Pittsburgensis Ritus Byzantini) is an archeparchy (or archdiocese) of the Ruthenian Greek Catholic Church that is located in the southern part of the United States of America. It is part of the Metropolis of Pittsburgh. The geographical remit of the archeparchy includes the states of Alabama, Arkansas, Kentucky, Louisiana, Mississippi, Oklahoma, Pennsylvania, Tennessee, Texas, and West Virginia. The incumbent archeparch is the Most Reverend William C. Skurla. The episcopal seat is situated in the city of Pittsburgh.

== History ==
=== Exarchate ===
In 1924, the church had been established by the Holy See as an exarchate, known as the '"Apostolic Exarchate of Pittsburgh for Faithful of the Oriental Rite (Ruthenian)'". Exarchate is an ecclesiastical term which indicates a "missionary diocese" or territory.

This move separated the Ruthenian Greek Catholic Church in the United States into two distinct groups: one for those originating from Galicia (in modern-day Ukraine) with its see in Philadelphia, Pennsylvania, and the other for those who were from the Carpathian Mountain region (in modern-day Ukraine and Slovakia), as well as those from Hungary and Croatia. In time, the two groups would come to be known as Ukrainian Greek Catholics and Ruthenian Greek Catholics, respectively.

=== (Arch)Eparchy ===
The Exarchate of Pittsburgh was elevated to the status of an eparchy in 1963.

Byzantine Catholics in the United States were given sui iuris (self-governing) status as a Metropolia (archdiocese) by Pope Paul VI in 1969. Archbishop Stephen Kocisko was installed as the first Metropolitan-Archbishop on June 11, 1969, at Holy Spirit Church in Oakland (Pittsburgh). He was the first prelate in the history of people from the Subcarpathian Rus region (of present-day Ukraine and Slovakia) to hold this rank.

== Operations ==
The seat of the Archeparchy is the St. John the Baptist Byzantine Catholic Cathedral in Munhall, Pennsylvania, a suburb of Pittsburgh.

The Archeparchy of Pittsburgh also operates SS. Cyril and Methodius Byzantine Catholic Seminary in the North Side section of the city, for the training of candidates for the priesthood and diaconate, cantors and those in other ministries. Established in 1950 by Bishop Daniel Ivancho, the seminary serves all four eparchies of the Byzantine Catholic Metropolitan Church of Pittsburgh.

=== Parishes ===
As of 2010, the Archeparchy has 85 parishes under its canonical jurisdiction.

The majority of the archepachy's parishes are located in Western Pennsylvania, particularly in the Pittsburgh and Johnstown metropolitan areas.

Although most Ohio parishes are under the jurisdiction of the Byzantine Catholic Eparchy of Parma, 5 churches in metropolitan Youngstown and 5 churches in Ohio River communities are governed by the archeparchy.

Additionally, there are churches in the following states: Louisiana (1), Tennessee (1), Texas (4), and West Virginia (2).

== Hierarchs ==
The current chancery office and residency is on 66 Riverview Avenue, Pittsburgh.

Apostolic Exarchs

- Basil Takach (1924–1948)
- Daniel Ivancho (1948–1954)

Eparchs

- Nicholas Thomas Elko (1955–1967)

Archeparchs

- Stephen John Kocisko (1967–1991)
- Thomas Victor Dolinay (1991–1993)
- Judson Michael Procyk (1994–2001)
- Basil Myron Schott, O.F.M. (2002–2010)
- William C. Skurla (since 2012)

Other priests of this eparchy who became bishops

- Michael Joseph Dudick (priest here, 1945–1963), appointed Bishop of Passaic (Ruthenian) in 1968
- Emil John Mihalik, appointed Bishop of Parma (Ruthenian) in 1969
- John Michael Kudrick, appointed Bishop of Parma (Ruthenian) in 2002

== See also ==
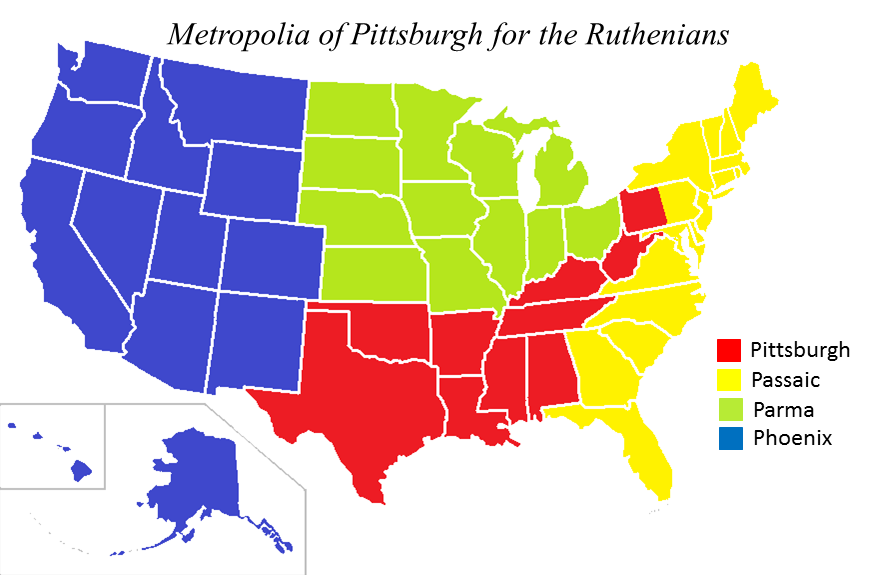
Metropolia of Pittsburgh map

- Byzantine Catholic Metropolitan Church of Pittsburgh
- Byzantine Catholic Eparchy of Parma
- Byzantine Catholic Eparchy of Passaic
- Eparchy of Phoenix (Ruthenian Greek Catholic Church)
- Byzantine Catholic Exarchate of Saints Cyril and Methodius of Toronto
- List of the Catholic bishops of the United States § Eastern Catholic eparchs
