= Holy Ghost Byzantine Catholic Church (Pittsburgh) =

Eastern Catholic church in Pennsylvania, US

Coordinates: 40.4664°N 80.0320°W

Holy Ghost Byzantine Catholic Church is an Eastern Catholic church in Pittsburgh, Pennsylvania, United States. It is located in the city's North Side neighborhood at 1437 Superior Avenue. Today it is best known as the church from which the funeral services of artist Andy Warhol were held in 1987.

== History ==
A parish of the Byzantine Catholic Metropolitan Church of Pittsburgh, the American branch of the Ruthenian Catholic Church, Holy Ghost Byzantine Catholic Church was founded by Rusyn immigrants on Pentecost Sunday, May 18, 1902. The Rev. John Korotnoki, who came to the United States from the Eparchy of Presov, Austria-Hungary (now in eastern Slovakia) was its first pastor.

Originally located on Doerr Street in Woods Run, new property was acquired in 1921 for relocation. In 1925 the interior of that church was damaged by fire, prompting the existing church to be built on Superior Avenue in 1927. It was dedicated in 1928 (98 years ago). A Social Center/Educational building was built nearby in 1971.

In 1975 Holy Ghost became the mother church of St. Andrew the Apostle Byzantine Catholic Church in the north suburb of Gibsonia.

== Andy Warhol ==
The family of Andy Warhol's brothers worshipped here at the time of Andy's death. The brothers decided to have the funeral's Divine Liturgy and burial service for Andy at Holy Ghost, with interment in the family plot at St. John the Baptist Byzantine Catholic Cemetery in Bethel Park, a south suburb of Pittsburgh.
