= Cathedral of St. Michael the Archangel (Passaic, New Jersey) =

Ruthenian Greek Catholic cathedral in the US

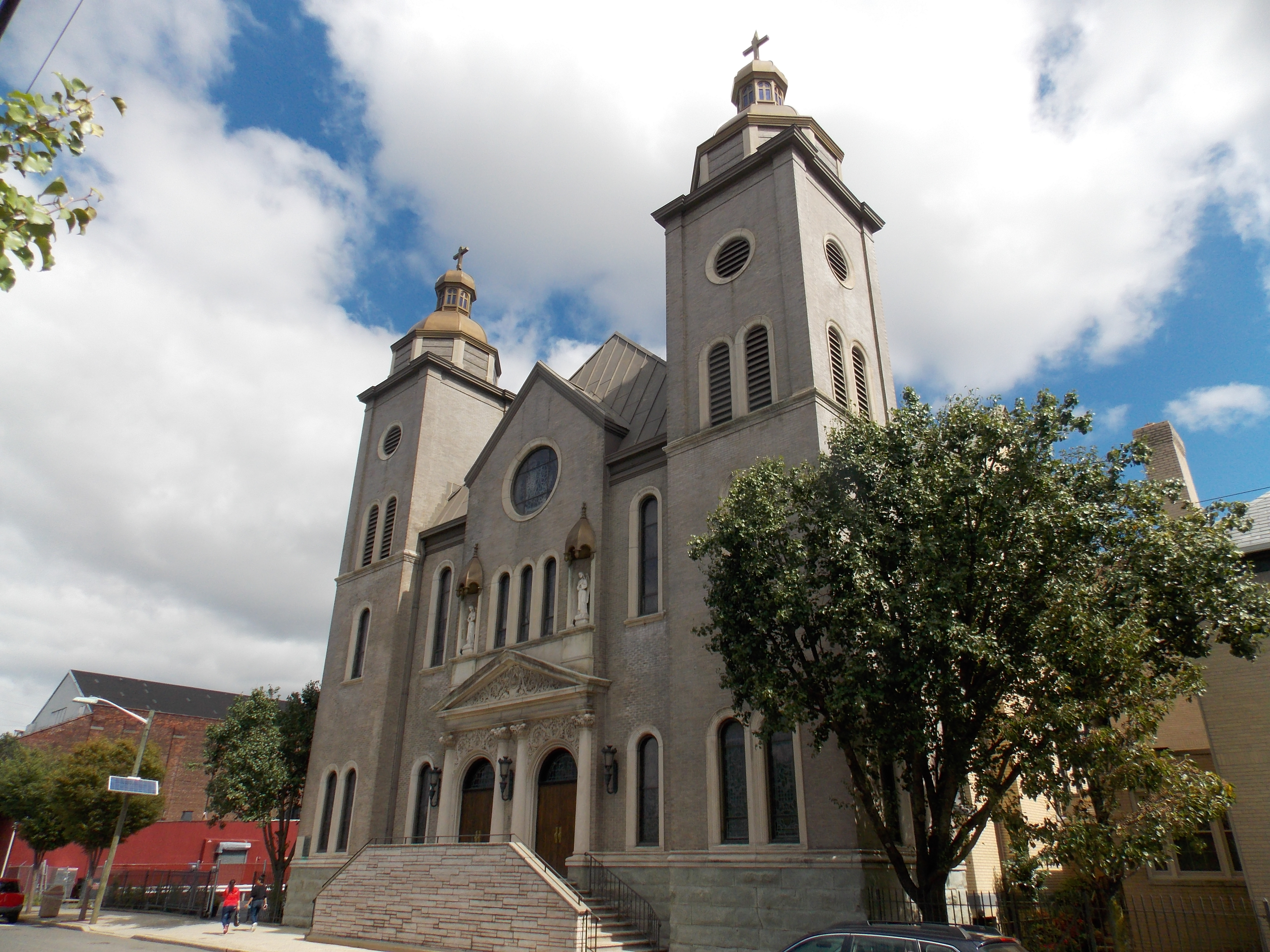

- Location within Passaic County, New Jersey
- 40°51′53.89″N 74°07′2.72″W
- Location: 96 First St. Passaic, New Jersey
- Country: United States
- Denomination: Catholic Church
- Sui iuris church: Ruthenian Greek Catholic Church
- Churchmanship: Byzantine Rite
- Website: stmichaelsarchangel.org

History
- Founded: 1890
- Dedication: Saint Michael the Archangel

Architecture
- Style: Byzantine Revival
- Groundbreaking: 1902
- Completed: 1905

Administration
- Diocese: Eparchy of Passaic

Clergy
- Bishop: Most Rev. Kurt Burnette
- Rector: Fr. John Custer

The Cathedral of St. Michael the Archangel is a Ruthenian Greek Catholic cathedral located in Passaic, New Jersey, United States. It is the cathedral for the Eparchy of Passaic.

== History ==
Eastern Europeans began to immigrate to the Passaic area in 1877. Father Alexander Dzubay began ministering to Byzantine Catholics in 1880 and ten years later St. Michael the Archangel parish was established. The former Evangelical Mission Chapel at the corner of First and Bergen streets was purchased in 1891 and Father Nicephor Chanath became the parish's first resident pastor. Construction on the present church was begun in 1902 and it was completed in 1905. Property was acquired in 1917 that became St. Michael's Cemetery. In 1953 the former Passaic School No. 2 became St. Michael's School and classes began on September 9.

The Eparchy of Passaic was established on July 31, 1963, and St. Michael's Church became the cathedral. Construction began in 1985 on the Cathedral Chapel of St. Michael and Social Center in West Paterson. It was dedicated on May 31, 1987.

== See also ==
- List of Catholic cathedrals in the United States
- List of cathedrals in the United States
