= Andrew Pataki =

His Grace Andrew Pataki
- Bishop Emeritus of Passaic for the Byzantines
- Other posts: Bishop of Passaic for the Byzantines (1996–2007); Bishop of Parma for the Byzantines (1984–1996); Auxiliary Bishop of Passaic for the Byzantines (1983–1984)

Orders
- Ordination: February 24, 1952
- Consecration: August 23, 1983

Personal details
- Born: August 30, 1927 Palmerton, Pennsylvania
- Died: December 8, 2011 (aged 84)

Andrew Pataki (August 30, 1927 – December 8, 2011) was an Eastern Catholic hierarch, the second bishop of Ruthenian Catholic Eparchy of Parma, and the third bishop of the Ruthenian Catholic Eparchy of Passaic.

== Early life and education ==
Pataki was born in Palmerton, Pennsylvania, on August 30, 1927. He attended elementary school in Palmerton Public Schools and Allentown Central Catholic High School in Allentown.

He continued his education at Saint Vincent College in Latrobe, Pennsylvania. He began studying for the priesthood in 1944, earning a bachelor's degree in philosophy from St. Procopius College-Seminary in Lisle, Illinois, in 1948. He completed his studies at the Byzantine Catholic Seminary of SS. Cyril and Methodius in Pittsburgh. On February 24, 1952, he was ordained a priest for the eparchy of Passaic in the seminary chapel by Bishop Daniel Ivancho.

== Career ==
The newly ordained Father Pataki earned his license in Sacred Theology at the Pontifical Oriental Institute in Rome, after which he was appointed the rector of SS. Cyril and Methodius Seminary. From 1973 until 1978, Pataki served on the Pontifical Commission for the Revision of the Eastern Code of Canon Law; he was also elevated to the rank of a Prelate of Honor by Pope Paul VI.

He was appointed auxiliary bishop of Passaic on June 14, 1983, with the titular see of Telmissus. He was consecrated a bishop on August 23 of the same year. On June 19, 1984, he was appointed the bishop of Parma for the Byzantines, and was installed on August 16, 1985. On November 6, 1995, he would be moved back to the Eparchy of Passaic, this time as its bishop—a post for which he was installed on February 8, 1996.

On December 6, 2007, when he was 80 years of age, Bishop Pataki's request for retirement was accepted by Pope Benedict XVI on account of his having passed the customary retirement age of 75 for Catholic bishops.

Catholic Church titles
Preceded by Emil J. Mihalik	Bishop of Parma for the Byzantines; 1984–1996	Succeeded by Basil M. Schott
Preceded by Michael J. Dudick	Bishop of Passaic for the Byzantines; 1996–2007	Succeeded by William C. Skurla
