= Alan Bowness =

British art historian (1928–2021)

Sir Alan Bowness CBE
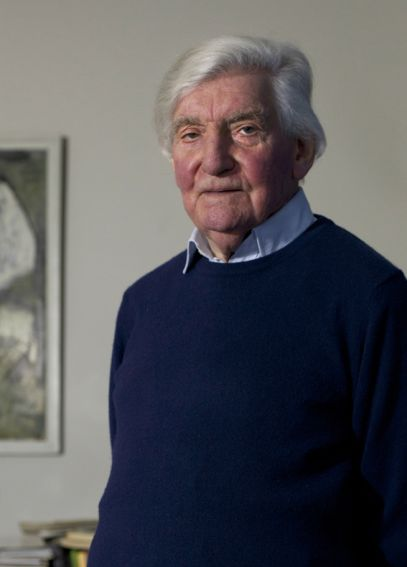
- Bowness in 2016
- Born: 11 January 1928; Finchley, Middlesex, England
- Died: 1 March 2021 (aged 93); London, England
- Education: Downing College, Cambridge; Courtauld Institute of Art
- Occupations: Art historian; museum director; art critic
- Title: Director of the Tate Gallery
- Term: 1980–1988

Sir Alan Bowness CBE (11 January 1928 – 1 March 2021) was a British art historian, art critic, and museum director. He was the director of the Tate Gallery between 1980 and 1988.

== Early life ==
Bowness was born in Finchley to Kathleen (née Benton) and George Bowness, a school teacher. He was educated at University College School in Hampstead. Leaving school at the end of the war, he worked with the Friends’ Ambulance Unit and the Friends’ Service Council in England, Germany and Lebanon from 1946 to 1950.

From 1950 to 1953, he studied Modern Languages at Downing College, Cambridge. From 1953 to 1955, he was a postgraduate student at the Courtauld Institute of Art, University of London, specialising in nineteenth-century French art.

== 1953 to 1980 ==
Bowness was active as an art critic in the late 1950s and early 1960s, writing for The Observer, Arts (New York), Art News and Review, The Times Literary Supplement, and The Burlington Magazine. He became a Regional Art Officer for the Arts Council in 1956, with responsibilities for the South West of England. In April that year, he visited St Ives, Cornwall, where he met artists who had settled there, including Barbara Hepworth, Ben Nicholson, Peter Lanyon, and Patrick Heron. In 1957, Bowness married Sarah Hepworth-Nicholson, daughter of Barbara Hepworth and Ben Nicholson.

In 1957, Bowness began teaching at the Courtauld Institute of Art. He became a Reader in 1967 and a professor in 1978. His popular book Modern European Art (1972) has been translated into French, German, Italian, and Korean.

During the 1960s, Bowness co-curated two major exhibitions of contemporary art at the Tate Gallery, London, 54:64 Painting and Sculpture of a Decade (1964) (with Lawrence Gowing) and Recent British Painting (1967) (with Norman Reid and Lilian Somerville). During the 1960s and 1970s, he also curated exhibitions for the Arts Council, including Vincent van Gogh (1968), Rodin (1970), French Symbolist Painters (1972), and Gustave Courbet (1978, with Michel Laclotte), as well as Post-Impressionism (Royal Academy, London and National Gallery of Art, Washington, D.C., 1979–80). Retrospectives he curated of contemporary artists for the Tate Gallery include; Ivon Hitchens (1963), Jean Dubuffet (1966), Peter Lanyon (1968), and William Scott (1972).

Between 1960 and 1970, Bowness published complete catalogues of the sculpture of Barbara Hepworth. Following the artist's death in 1975, Bowness ran the Hepworth Estate. In accordance with Hepworth's wishes, he oversaw the opening of her former house and studio in St Ives as the Barbara Hepworth Museum and Sculpture Garden in 1976. Since 2008 the Hepworth Estate has been run by his daughter, art historian Sophie Bowness.

== Tate Gallery (1980–1988) ==
Between 1980 and 1988, Bowness was Director of the Tate Gallery. During this time, he realised the expansion of Tate's Millbank site by creating the Clore Wing to display the work of J. M. W. Turner, uniting the collection that had been divided between the British Museum and the Tate. Bowness instigated the creation of Tate Liverpool, which opened in May 1988. At a time when the Tate's public grant had been capped, Bowness established patrons' groups to fund the purchase of historic and contemporary work. The Tate's collection of post-war American and European art grew especially substantially during this time. Bowness also began the preparations for the Tate St Ives (opened in 1993).

The Turner Prize was established under Bowness's directorship in 1984 as an initiative to foster interest in contemporary British art.

== Later life and honours ==
After retiring from the Tate, Bowness became Director of the Henry Moore Foundation, setting up the Henry Moore Institute in Leeds, Yorkshire. He was appointed a CBE in 1976 and knighted in 1988. He was also an Honorary Fellow of the Royal College of Art, the Courtauld Institute of Art, and Downing College, Cambridge.

His collection of paintings by British artists, 1950–70 (Scott, Lanyon, Heron, Hilton, and others), is bequeathed to the Fitzwilliam Museum, Cambridge, and his art history library to Cambridge University Library.

Bowness died at his home in London on 1 March 2021, aged 93.

A selection of his writings, with an introduction by Dawn Ades, was published by Art Publishing Inc. in 2025.

== Publications ==
Bowness's published writings include:

- Introduction, Four English Middle Generation Painters: Heron / Frost / Wynter / Hilton (Waddington Galleries, May 1959).
- Catalogue of works in J. P. Hodin, Barbara Hepworth (Lund Humphries, 1961).
- William Scott: Paintings (Lund Humphries, 1964).
- Henry Moore: Complete Sculpture, vol. 2 (Lund Humphries, revised edition, 1965) to vol. 6 (Lund Humphries, 1988).
- Alan Davie (Lund Humphries, 1967).
- Peter Lanyon (Tate Gallery, 1968).
- "Vincent in England" and catalogue, Vincent van Gogh (Hayward Gallery, 1968).
- The Complete Sculpture of Barbara Hepworth 1960–69 (Lund Humphries, 1971).
- Gauguin (Phaidon, 1971).
- Modern European Art (Thames & Hudson, 1972).
- Ivon Hitchens (Lund Humphries, 1973).
- Victor Pasmore: with a catalogue raisonné of the paintings, constructions and graphics, 1926-1979 (Thames & Hudson, 1980), with Luigi Lambertini.
- The Conditions of Success: How the Modern Artist Rises to Fame (Thames & Hudson, 1989), based on the Walter Neurath Memorial Lecture, 1989.
- Poetry and Painting: Baudelaire, Mallarmé, Apollinaire, and their Painter Friends (Clarendon Press, 1994), based on the Zaharoff Lecture for 1991–2.
- "Ten Good Years" in Generation Painting 1955–65: British Art from the Collection of Sir Alan Bowness (The Heong Gallery at Downing College, Cambridge, 2016).

== Filmed interviews ==
- Trewyn Studio (2015, dir. Helena Bonett).
- Sir Alan Bowness speaks about 'Generation Painting 1955-65' (2016, The Heong Gallery at Downing College, film by Jonathan Law).
- Memories of Barbara, Ben and the St Ives Modernists (2017, Porthmeor Studios, St Ives).

Cultural offices
Preceded by Norman Reid	Director of the Tate Gallery; 1980–1988	Succeeded by Nicholas Serota
