= Nicholas Elko =

- Titular Archeparch of Dara
- Church: Ruthenian Greek Catholic Church
- In office: December 22, 1967 – May 18, 1991
- Predecessor: Antonio Riberi
- Successor: Sede Vacante
- Previous posts: Auxiliary Bishop of Cincinnati (1971-1985); Eparch of Pittsburgh (1963-1967); Apostolic Exarch of the United States of America (1955-1963); Titular Eparch of Apollonias (1955-1963); Apostolic Administrator of the United States of America (1954-1955)

Orders
- Ordination: September 30, 1934 by Basil Takach
- Consecration: March 6, 1955 by Eugène Tisserant

Personal details
- Born: Nicholas Thomas Elko; December 14, 1909 Donora, Pennsylvania, United States
- Died: May 18, 1991 (aged 81)

Nicholas Thomas Elko (December 14, 1909 – May 18, 1991) was an American Ruthenian Greek Catholic and the third bishop of the Byzantine Catholic Metropolitan Church of Pittsburgh. At the age of 46 he became the first American-born bishop of the Ruthenian Greek Catholic Church. He later served as Auxiliary Bishop of the Archdiocese of Cincinnati, a Latin Church archdiocese.

== Early life ==
Born on December 14, 1909, to Rusyn immigrant parents in Donora, Pennsylvania, a steel town in the Monongahela River Valley, he attended the public schools there and in 1930 graduated from Duquesne University in Pittsburgh. He completed graduate theological studies at the Greek Catholic Seminary in Uzhhorod and at the Catholic University of Leuven in Belgium. Bishop Basil Takach ordained him to the priesthood on September 30, 1934, at St. Nicholas Greek Catholic Church in McKeesport, Pennsylvania.

He next served as pastor in several parishes throughout the Exarchate and as the spiritual director of the Greek Catholic Union of the USA, the oldest continuous fraternal benefit society for Rusyn immigrants and their descendants in the U.S. Elko also served in the administration of the Exarchate as Dean of the Cleveland Deanery, Consultor, and eventually as Vicar General. Pope Pius XII in 1952 named him a domestic prelate with the title of Reverend Monsignor. He was appointed that same year as the Rector of the Exarchate's new seminary, the Byzantine Catholic Seminary of SS. Cyril and Methodius.

Bishop Daniel Ivancho appointed Elko in 1954 as the Rector of St. John the Baptist Byzantine Catholic Cathedral. Yet just three months later, Ivancho abruptly resigned as bishop, and the Holy See directed Elko, as the Vicar General of the Exarchate, to administer it. On February 16, 1955, Archbishop Amleto Giovanni Cicognani, the Vatican's delegate to the United States, announced that Elko would be elevated to the episcopacy. On March 6, 1955, he was ordained as bishop at St. Peter's Basilica in Rome, Italy, by Cardinal Eugène-Gabriel-Gervais-Laurent Tisserant, Dean of the College of Cardinals and the Secretary of the Congregation for the Oriental Churches.

== Episcopate of Bishop Elko ==
The formerly immigrant Ruthenian Church was by the 1950s now overwhelmingly American-born and modernizing rapidly in the post-World War II era. Bishop Elko sought to engage the new generation by leading change within the Exarchate. He immediately sought and was granted permission by Rome to permit English, in addition to the ancient liturgical language, Church Slavonic, to be used in the celebration of the Divine Liturgy.

He next established in 1956 a new weekly newspaper, The Byzantine Catholic World. The term "Byzantine Catholic" was relatively new and represented something of a re-branding for the Church. The term began in usage in the 1940s in an effort to clarify the ritual identification of the church to the majority American Latin Church Catholics, replacing the traditional European appellation of "Greek Catholic". The Church roots were historically "Greek" in the sense that Christianity came to the Slavs in the 9th century by the missionary brothers Saint Cyril and Saint Methodius. But the new name aimed to evoke the even older and more glorious history of Eastern Christianity in Constantinople and the Byzantine Empire.

In 1956, he petitioned the Holy See for an auxiliary bishop to assist him. Bishop Stephen John Kocisko was installed to the position.

Elko's administration also undertook the construction of more than one hundred churches and schools. However, in the spirit of Latinization and assimilation, Elko recommended that many traditional Byzantine architectural features, such iconostasis, or as icon screens, be omitted or removed from the new or renovated churches. The church's membership, largely in the northeastern United States, began to migrate to the West. Elko assigned priests to do organizational work there, and established new parishes in California and Alaska.

=== Rome upgrades the American Church's status ===
Since its inception in 1924 as the "Apostolic Exarchate of United States of America, Faithful of the Oriental Rite (Ruthenian)", the organizational status of Elko's American Greek Catholic Church was merely that of a missionary territory with limited self-governing authority, the homeland being Europe - albeit under Communist persecution since 1946.

On July 6, 1963, the Vatican upgraded the status of the church from exarchate to eparchy. A decree by the newly elected Pope Paul VI divided the entire U.S. territory of the Ruthenian Greek Catholic Church into two separate ecclesiastical jurisdictions. The first, with its episcopal see in Passaic, New Jersey, included the Eastern states and the second jurisdiction, centered in Pittsburgh, included the rest of the nation. Both jurisdictions now held the canonical status of an eparchy or a full diocese. Elko continued as the American Ruthenians' senior hierarch, but a new bishop, Stephen Kocisko, was installed for Passaic.

=== Controversy ===
By 1967, Elko's popularity within his own church waned on account of the rapid change he led, the confusion among laity around many Vatican II reforms, and especially Elko's authoritarian management style. Whether priest or laity, ethnic or assimilated, many in the Church were agitated by Elko's leadership. Petitions were signed and sent off to Rome. The Vatican, fearing more dissension in the Church like that experienced during the 1930s, transferred Elko to Rome. He was then elevated to archbishop and appointed as the ordaining prelate for the Byzantine Catholics in Rome and head of the Ecumenical Commission on the Liturgy. This prompted his resignation as the Ruthenian Bishop of Pittsburgh, and Monsignor Edward V. Rosack, the chancellor of the eparchy, was named as the temporary apostolic administrator. Bishop Kocisko was named as the new Bishop of the Eparchy of Pittsburgh in December 1967.

Time Magazine reported on the unusual situation, noting that a "bishop is almost never separated from his see. For the past seven months, however, the Most Rev. Nicholas T. Elko, Ruthenian bishop of Pittsburgh, has been in Rome, barred by his church superiors from returning to his diocese. The case of Bishop Elko, who describes his situation as 'exile', casts fascinating light on Catholicism's current internal stresses...". Three years later, the Vatican sent Elko back to the U.S., but not to his Byzantine Church.

== Auxiliary Bishop of Cincinnati ==
In 1970, Archbishop Elko started anew as Auxiliary Archbishop in the Archdiocese of Cincinnati (the first and only Eastern Catholic auxiliary bishop of a Latin diocese in the United States). He served in this capacity for fourteen years, and upon reaching his seventy-fifth birthday, retired.

Elko died of cancer on May 18, 1991, aged 81. He is interred in the Priest's Circle at Gate of Heaven Cemetery, Montgomery, Ohio.

== Publications ==
He wrote an historical novel, which was published posthumously in 1994. White Heat Over Red Fire features Thomas Christophe, a young Eastern Catholic bishop ministering in post-war Austria. The novel makes much of the intrigues of the Cold War years, the struggles of the Church in Eastern Europe, the attempts to reconcile the Catholic and Eastern Orthodox Churches, and the upheaval within the Catholic Church in the wake of Vatican II.

He also co-wrote The Family: America’s Hope in 1979, with Michael Novak, Harold Voth and James Hitchcock.

Catholic Church titles
| Preceded by Daniel Ivancho | Bishop of the Metropolia of Pittsburgh (Ruthenian); 1955–1967 | Succeeded by Stephen Kocisko |
