= Mary Chamot =

Russian-English museum curator (1899–1993)

- Portrait of Mary Chamot 1927, by Nadia Benois
- Born: 8 November 1899; Saint Petersburg, Russia
- Died: 10 May 1993 (aged 93); Wadhurst, United Kingdom
- Education: Slade School of Fine Art
- Partner: Lulette Gerebzov

Mary Chamot (8 November 1899 – 10 May 1993) was a Russian-born English art historian and museum curator, and the first woman curator at the Tate Gallery.

== Biography ==
Chamot was born on 8 November 1899 in Strelna, near Saint Petersburg, the only child of Alfred Edward Chamot (1854-1934) (English-born and of French descent), an administrator of the Imperial Palace Gardens at Strelna, and Elisabeth Chamot (née Grooten), of Dutch and German origin.

Mary Chamot lived at Strelna with her parents until 1918 when the family left Russia following the Revolution. In conversation with Dr. Anthony Parton (1985), she remembered Strelna as a 'dacha' town but with access by train to St. Petersburg in one direction and Peterhof (the next stop on the line from Strelna) in the other. At Peterhof, she heard the Court Orchestra play on summer nights and in 1914 she was introduced to the four Grand Duchesses, who were selling flags there in aid of the Russian war effort. In 1913 she went on a European tour, visiting Austria, Italy, France and Germany but otherwise remained in Strelna. In 1917 she enrolled as an art student at the Academy of Fine Art in St. Petersburg, where she studied under Dmitry Kardovsky (1866-1943) but also met Kuzma Petrov-Vodkin and visited his studio. She remembered how, in the early months of the Revolution, she and her family approached starvation. The only food available was raw potatoes but they had no fuel with which to bake them. Consequently, she had to queue in line at the local railway station to ask the guardsmen of the arriving and departing trains to bake them in engine fires.

In 1918 the family left Russia by boat via the Gulf of Finland and travelled to Bergen. They were in Norway when the Armistice was announced. Subsequently, they took a boat to Aberdeen, from where they took the train to Yorkshire and lodged with an aunt who lived there. Eventually, the family settled in London, where Mary Chamot's mother taught French and German and her father translated Russian plays and novels by writers such at Chekhov and Leskov. Mary enrolled as a student at the Slade School of Fine Art and earned a Fine Art Diploma in 1922. She executed a portrait commission but then became interested in Art History and, as she later put it, "I have not had time to paint ever since". Her friends included Stanley Spencer, Gilbert Spencer, the Carlines, Lord Methuen, Edward Bawden and Jim Ede.

During 1945-1949, Chamot worked as a Russian interpreter with the Allied Commission in Vienna. Having returned to the UK in 1949, she became the first woman curator at London's Tate Gallery. At the Tate she was Assistant Keeper and worked closely with Sir John Rothenstein and Ronald Alley. It was at this time that she became friendly with the two Russian avant-garde artists and Ballets Russes designers Natalia Goncharova (1881-1962) and Mikhail Larionov (1881-1964). She first met the two artists in 1954 when, in her capacity as Assistant Keeper of the Tate Gallery, she visited Paris in order to purchase works for the Tate Permanent Collection. Her friendship with the two artists led to her publishing an essay on their early work in Burlington Magazine in 1955. In 1961, Chamot, alongside Camilla Gray, curated a major retrospective exhibition of their work for the Arts Council of Great Britain. Two monographs, both dedicated to the work of Goncharova, followed in 1972 and 1979. During the 1980s Mary Chamot was recognized as an authority on Russian avant-garde art and on the work of both Goncharova and Larionov in particular.

After her retirement from the Tate Gallery, London and from 1965 to 1977 Chamot became the London-based agent for the National Art Gallery of New Zealand and was pivotal in the development of the modern art collection at that institution. She visited New Zealand a number of times and was committed to the development of the collection to the point where she gifted some of her own significant art collection in 1983.

In her later years Mary Chamot lived at 57 Melbury Road, London W14 8AD. When the lease came up on the property in 1983 she moved at first to 6 Wyndham House, Sloane Square, London, SW1; then to Creswell House, 43-44 Cadogan Place, London, SW1X R9U and finally to 69 Oakwood Court, Addison Road, London W14 8JF. Her final move took place in 1989, when Chamot retired to Weald Hall, Wadhurst, East Sussex. She died there on 10 May 1993.

== Publications ==
- English Medieval Enamels, Ernest Benn, London, 1930.
- Modern Painting in England, Country Life Ltd., London & Charles Scribner's Sons, New York, 1937.
- Painting in England from Hogarth to Whistler (1939)
- The Arts: Painting, The Graphic Arts, Sculpture and Architecture, Odhams Press, (1948)
- Russian Painting and Sculpture Pergamon Press, London (1963)
- (With Farr, D., & Butlin, M.), The Modern British Paintings, Drawings And Sculpture - Volumes I and II [Tate Gallery Catalogues], Oldbourne Press, London (1964)
- Turner: The Early Works, The Tate Gallery, London, 1965
- Gontcharova, Bibliothèque des Arts, Paris (1972)
- Goncharova: Stage Designs and Paintings, Oresko Books, London (1979)

== Translations from the French ==
- Bazin, G., Italian Painting in the Xivth and Xvth Centuries, Hyperion Press, London, 1938.
- Lepage-Medvey, French Costumes, The Hyperion Press, London, Paris, New York, 1939.
- Reau, L., French Paintings in Xivth, Xvth and Xvith Centuries, Hyperion Press, London, 1939.
- Cassou, J., Picasso, The Hyperion Press, London, 1940.
- Lassaigne J., Toulouse Lautrec, The Hyperion Press, London, 1946.
