= Mount Saint Macrina =

Historic house in Pennsylvania, United States

- Oak Hill Estate
- U.S. National Register of Historic Places
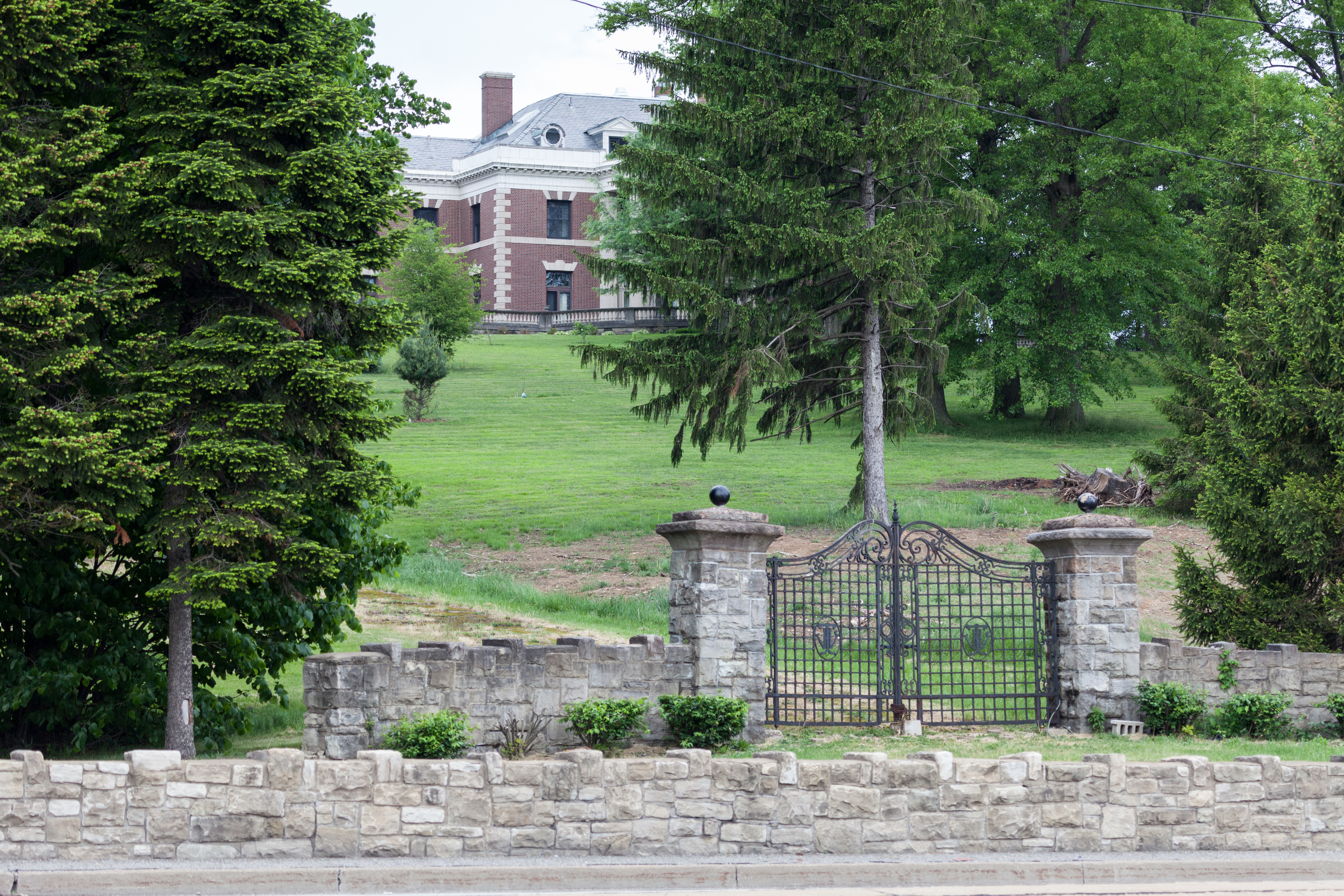
- Southwest facade of Oak Hill, behind the original west gate. A low modern wall is in the foreground.

- Location within Pennsylvania Location within the United States
- Location: U.S. Route 40, 0.25 miles west of U.S. Route 119, North Union Township, Fayette County, Pennsylvania
- Coordinates: 39°54′54″N 79°44′26″W
- Area: 261 acres (106 ha)
- Built: 1903
- Architect: Ernest Woodyatt; Daniel Burnham
- Architectural style: Classical Revival
- NRHP reference No.: 99000514
- Added to NRHP: May 12, 1999

Mount Saint Macrina – also known as Oak Hill Estate and Fox Hill – is a historic estate in North Union Township, Fayette County, Pennsylvania, United States. It is the site of the largest pilgrimage among Ruthenian Byzantine Catholics in North America. It is also home to the monastery of Byzantine Catholic Order of Sisters of St. Basil.

It was added to the National Register of Historic Places in 1999.

== History ==
Established in 1933 by Mother Macrina Melnychuk (1879-1948) near Uniontown, Pennsylvania, the pilgrimage takes place each Labor Day weekend on the grounds of the Basilian monastery there, drawing more than 30,000. Mount Saint Macrina, named for Saint Basil's sister, Saint Macrina, was formally dedicated in 1934.

Once named Oak Hill, it was the estate (more than 1,000 acres) of coal baron J.V. Thompson (Josiah Van Kirk Thompson), a leading figure in the great coal and coke boom of the late 19th century. Financial misfortune forced him into bankruptcy, and in 1933 the Byzantine Catholic Order of Sisters of St. Basil acquired the property. The Thompson mansion, visible from U.S. Route 40, is now the Sisters' retreat center.

The monastery for the community of sisters is a five-story yellow brick building at the north end of the property. An international Order, other groups of the Sisters of St. Basil are spread throughout the world. The newest building on the property is Mount Macrina Manor Nursing Home, dedicated in 1971. Today, the Thompson Mansion serves as a retreat center.

Brothers of Prayers previously held their weekly prayer gathering on the Mount Saint Macrina grounds originally in the Trinity Center and eventually the House of Prayer chapel. The Brothers have moved to St. Thérèse de Lisieux Church, 61 Mill Street, Uniontown, PA. Tuesday evenings from 7:00 to 8:15 PM EST.

In 1999, the Department of the Interior named Mount Saint Macrina to the National Register of Historic Places under its old name of "Oak Hill Estate."

== Architectural features ==
Located on the property are seven contributing buildings, four contributing sites, and one contributing structure. The estate was developed in 1903, by coal baron J.V. Thompson, an associate of Henry Clay Frick, and was conceptualized by architect Daniel Burnham. The mansion is a three-story, forty-two-room, 18,313-square-foot, brick building that was designed in the Classical Revival style. Other contributing buildings include a smaller residence built for Thompson's son, a pool house, a carriage house/stable, a pumphouse, a schoolhouse/servant's quarters, and garage. The contributing sites and structure are the Springer cemetery (c. 1840), west gate and drive, stone wall, and the remains of a small garage, racetrack, and conservatory/pool.

== Burials ==
- Basil Takach, in the cemetery of Mount Saint Macrina Monastery
- Stephen Kocisko, in the cemetery of Mount Saint Macrina Monastery
- Thomas Dolinay, in the cemetery of Mount Saint Macrina Monastery
- Basil Schott
- George Kuzma
