= Daniel Ivancho =

American bishop (1908–1972)

His Grace the Most Reverend Daniel Ivancho
- Apostolic Exarch of Pittsburgh
- Church: Ruthenian Greek Catholic Church
- Metropolis: Exarchate of Pittsburgh
- Appointed: 13 May 1948
- Quashed: 2 December 1954
- Predecessor: Basil Takach
- Successor: Nicholas Elko

Orders
- Ordination: 30 September 1934 (priest) · 5 November 1946 (coadjutor bishop) by Basil Takach

Personal details
- Born: Daniel Eugene Ivancho; March 30, 1908; Körösmező, Máramaros, Austria-Hungary
- Died: August 2, 1972 (aged 64); St. Petersburg, Florida, United States
- Buried: Calvary Catholic Cemetery, Clearwater, Florida

Daniel Eugene Ivancho (March 30, 1908 – August 2, 1972) was the second bishop of the Byzantine Catholic Metropolitan Church of Pittsburgh, the American branch of the Ruthenian Catholic Church.

== Early life ==
Born on March 30, 1908, in Körösmező, Máramaros, Austria-Hungary (now Yasinia, Ukraine), he emigrated at the age of eight to the United States and settled in Cleveland, Ohio, with his widowed mother. He graduated from St. Ignatius High School (Cleveland) in Cleveland, Ohio, in 1926. He graduated from St. Procopius College in Lisle, Illinois, and completed his seminary training in Rome, Italy. Due to illness, he transferred to Uzhhorod Theological Seminary where he completed his studies. On September 30, 1934, Bishop Basil Takach ordained him to the priesthood and he served in parish assignments.

== Episcopate of Bishop Ivancho ==
When Bishop Takach was diagnosed with terminal cancer in the 1940s, a request was made to the Holy See for the appointment of an auxiliary bishop. Monsignor George Michaylo and Father Stephen Gulovich were perceived to be leading candidates, but the Vatican announced the appointment of Ivancho, a dark horse. The 1946 official decree declared his status to be a "Coadjutor Bishop", mandating that he would automatically become Bishop Takach's successor.

He was ordained as the first-ever Coadjutor Bishop of the Greek Catholic Exarchate of Pittsburgh on November 5, 1946. In order to accommodate the crowds, the ceremony was held at the Cathedral of Saint Paul of the Roman Catholic Diocese of Pittsburgh in the Oakland district. Byzantine and Roman Catholic bishops and clergy attended, as did Empress Zita and other members of the Imperial Habsburg family of the former Austro-Hungarian Empire. Monsignor Fulton J. Sheen was the homilist for the ordination.

In May 1948, Takach died, and Ivancho became the new bishop. Some advisors urged that the construction of a new cathedral church should be a priority. They believed a new cathedral—not the 1903 St. John the Baptist Byzantine Catholic Cathedral—was needed in the post-World War II era. More seating capacity and a more central location in Pittsburgh, they argued, would better showcase the identity of the Eastern Catholic church. Ivancho, however, tackled the problem of seminary training. In a pastoral letter dated June 14, 1950, he announced plans for the construction and operation of the first Eastern Catholic seminary in the United States. Byzantine Catholic Seminary of SS. Cyril and Methodius was completed in October 1951.

Ivancho resigned suddenly for personal reasons on December 2, 1954. According to a historical account by Serge Keleher, Ivancho was forced to resign once it was revealed that he had secretly married after his priestly ordination. He died in retirement in Florida in 1972.

Preceded by Basil Takach	Bishop of the Metropolia of Pittsburgh (Ruthenian); 1948–1954	Succeeded by Nicholas Elko
