= Michael Dudick =

- Eparch of Passaic
- Church: Ruthenian Greek Catholic Church
- Diocese: Eparchy of Passaic
- In office: July 29, 1968 – November 6, 1995
- Predecessor: Stephen Kocisko
- Successor: Andrew Pataki

Orders
- Ordination: November 13, 1945 by Basil Takach
- Consecration: October 24, 1968 by Stephen Kocisko

Personal details
- Born: Michael Joseph Dudick; February 24, 1916 St. Clair, Pennsylvania, United States
- Died: May 30, 2007 (aged 91)

Michael Joseph Dudick (February 24, 1916 – May 30, 2007) was an American priest and bishop of the Byzantine Catholic Metropolitan Church of Pittsburgh, the U.S. branch of the Ruthenian Catholic Church.

== Biography ==
He was born to Rusyn immigrant parents in St. Clair, Pennsylvania and was educated in the public schools there. He attended Illinois Benedictine College and St. Procopius Seminary, both in Lisle, Illinois, then was ordained to the priesthood on November 13, 1945 by Bishop Basil Takach at St. John the Baptist Byzantine Catholic Cathedral in Munhall, Pennsylvania. His many parish appointments include churches in Ohio, Pittsburgh, and throughout Western Pennsylvania.

When the Byzantine Catholic Eparchy of Passaic was established in 1963, Dudick was appointed its first chancellor. Pope Paul VI conferred upon him the rank of Right Reverend Monsignor on October 25, 1963. He was ordained a bishop and enthroned on October 24, 1968 as the second bishop of Byzantine Catholic Eparchy of Passaic in St. Michael Cathedral there. Thirty-two new parishes and missions were created during his tenure and two monasteries were established: the Basilian Fathers of Mariapoch in Matawan, New Jersey and the Byzantine Discalced Carmelites in Sugarloaf, Pennsylvania. He also constructed a new Eparchial Center in Woodland Park, New Jersey and a spiritual and recreational Center, Carpathian Village, in northeastern Pennsylvania. He established the Heritage Institute Museum and Library in 1972, which houses a collection of religious and secular paintings, ecclesiastical art, vestments, national dress, embroideries, folk art and other memorabilia. The Institute's library features a collection of rare Slavonic books and manuscripts..

Dudick also served as a member of the Congregation for the Oriental Churches and as a member of the Committee for the Revision of Eastern Canon Law. He chaired the Eastern Catholic Bishops Association as well as a member on the Inter-Rite Committee and the Ecumenical Committee, both of the United States Conference of Catholic Bishops. He also served on the Board of Overseers for Harvard University and on the Board of Regents of Seton Hall University.

Dudick retired as bishop in 1995. He died at age 91 in 2007. He is buried in the cemetery of Mount Saint Macrina Monastery in Uniontown, Pennsylvania.

== See also ==
- Byzantine Catholic Archeparchy of Pittsburgh

Preceded by Stephen Kocisko	Bishop of the Eparchy of Passaic (Ruthenian); 1968–1995	Succeeded by Andrew Pataki
