= Open campaign =

Activist or campaign with clear goals and methods

An open campaign is an activist or civil society campaign with a clear goal and transparent methods. This is contrast to political action planned secretly in closed groups. Open campaigns often seek meaningful involvement in campaign planning from a range of people affected by or interested in the campaign issue. One notable proponent of open campaigning is Greenpeace.

Open campaigns share information about their cause by various methods including social media, videos, public talks, organizing meetings, leaflet and mailing distribution, press releases, petitions. Action taken may include, writing letters to officials, public protest or direct action. The location and timing of a campaign is usually also an important consideration. Transparent fundraising may also be an element of an open campaign.

== See also ==
- Grassroots activism
- Community organizing
- Non-governmental organization
- Public participation
