= Basil Takach =

- Apostolic Exarch of United States of America
- Native name: Василий Такач
- Church: Ruthenian Greek Catholic Church
- See: Apostolic Exarchate of the United States of America
- In office: May 20, 1924 – May 13, 1948
- Predecessor: Exarchate erected
- Successor: Daniel Ivancho
- Other post: Titular Eparch of Zela (1924-1948)

Orders
- Ordination: December 12, 1902 by Yuliy Firtsak
- Consecration: June 15, 1924 by Josaphat Kotsylovsky

Personal details
- Born: October 27, 1879 Vuchkove, Máramaros County, Kingdom of Hungary, Transleithania, Austria-Hungary
- Died: May 13, 1948 (aged 68) Pittsburgh, Pennsylvania, United States

Basil Takach (October 27, 1879 – May 13, 1948) was the first bishop of the Byzantine Catholic Metropolitan Church of Pittsburgh, the American branch of the Ruthenian Greek Catholic Church.

== Early life ==
Born in a Rusyn village in Máramaros County, Austria-Hungary, he followed the example of his father and his uncle and entered the Ungvár Theological Seminary. He was ordained to the priesthood on December 14, 1902, aged 23. He served as a parish priest for nine years. The then Mukacevo Eparch Julius Firczak appointed him as the controller of the Eparchial bank and executive officer of its Unio Publishing Company, as well as the superior of the "Alumneum", the Eparchy's boarding school.

After World War I, he became spiritual director (1920–1924) of the Eparchy's seminary and professor at Ungvár Theological Seminary. At this time he was selected as the new bishop for the newly established Greek Catholic Exarchate in the United States.

Consecrated as a bishop in Rome, Italy on Pentecost Sunday, June 15, 1924, he set sail two months later aboard the liner Mauretania for the United States. On August 13, 1924, a crowd greeted him on the pier of New York Harbor. He led a service of thanksgiving at St. Mary's Greek Catholic Church in New York and followed by a welcoming banquet at the Hotel Pennsylvania.

== Episcopate of Bishop Takach ==
The new Exarchate had been erected on May 8, 1924, with the official English name "Apostolic Exarchate of the United States of America, Faithful of the Oriental Rite (Ruthenian)" (Latin: Foederatarum Civitatum Americae Septemtrionalis).

The papal bull appointing Takach as bishop expressly stated that the new episcopal seat was to be New York City. New York, however, had a small Rusyn population. So he established temporary residences, first in Trenton, New Jersey, and later in Uniontown, Pennsylvania, as he deliberated on a more appropriate location.

Representatives of St. John the Baptist Greek Catholic Church in Munhall, Pennsylvania, a steel town suburb of Pittsburgh, presented to him a formal proposal offering land and financial assistance—if he would establish his residence and episcopal seat at the parish. Given the parish's close proximity to the main offices of the Greek Catholic Union of the USA, the oldest and largest fraternal organization serving the Rusyn community, and especially because Western Pennsylvania was home to the largest Rusyn-American population, Takach accepted the offer. He designated St. John's as the cathedral of the new Exarchate. St. John the Baptist had been constructed in 1903 and designed by the Hungarian-born architect, Titus de Bobula, who patterned it after the Rusyn Greek Catholic Cathedral of the Exaltation of the Holy Cross in Uzhhorod. By February 1926, a new bishop's residence and chancery was completed across the street from the cathedral.

Bishop Takach next visited his people with an eye toward creating regional governing districts or deaneries for the Exarchate. Thirteen deaneries were created with the following seats: New York City, Jersey City, Philadelphia, Scranton, Hazleton, Johnstown, Punxsutawney, Pittsburgh, Homestead, Uniontown, Youngstown, Cleveland, and Chicago. The first church census showed the new Pittsburgh Greek Catholic Exarchate consisted of almost 300,000 faithful organized into 155 parishes and mission churches served by 129 priests. Also, during his tenure the Sisters of St. Basil established and staffed ten parochial schools and six catechetical schools throughout the Exarchate.

== Controversy and schism ==
Greek Rite Catholicism in the United States, which began in the 1880s with large-scale emigration from Eastern Europe, was administered by the American Roman Catholic hierarchy, which by the early 20th century instituted a subtle campaign to Latinize its conduct.

Fearing that a minority of married Greek Catholic priests might cause envy among celibate Roman Catholic priests, Pope Pius X in 1907 issued an apostolic letter enjoining celibacy upon all Catholic priests in the United States. Many Greek Catholics were angered. They argued that by the 1646 Union of Uzhhorod their clergy had been granted the right to marry before ordination. Some members of the church snubbed the papal letter, and it remained unenforced.

The Holy See issued a decree in 1929 entitled Cum Data Fuerit, which reiterated Rome's previous position that the Greek Catholic clergy in America must be celibate. Takach opposed the new decree, but his appeals were rebuffed. During the 1930s some priests and laity started an open campaign against him and attacked his authority to govern, and many parishes were drawn into the conflict and numerous legal battles for control of church properties ensued. The conflict produced a schism within the Exarchate and led to the formation of the American Carpatho-Russian Orthodox Diocese, which affiliated with the Eastern Orthodox Church.

== Death ==
Basil Takach died in Pittsburgh on May 13, 1948, aged 68. He is buried in the cemetery of Mount Saint Macrina Monastery in Uniontown, Pennsylvania.

Catholic Church titles
Office established	Ruthenian Greek Catholic Bishop of the Metropolia of Pittsburgh; 1924–1948	Succeeded by Daniel Ivancho
