= Eparchy of Passaic =

Eastern Catholic eparchy in the eastern United States

Eparchy of Passaic (Ruthenian) Eparchia Passaicensis Ruthenorum
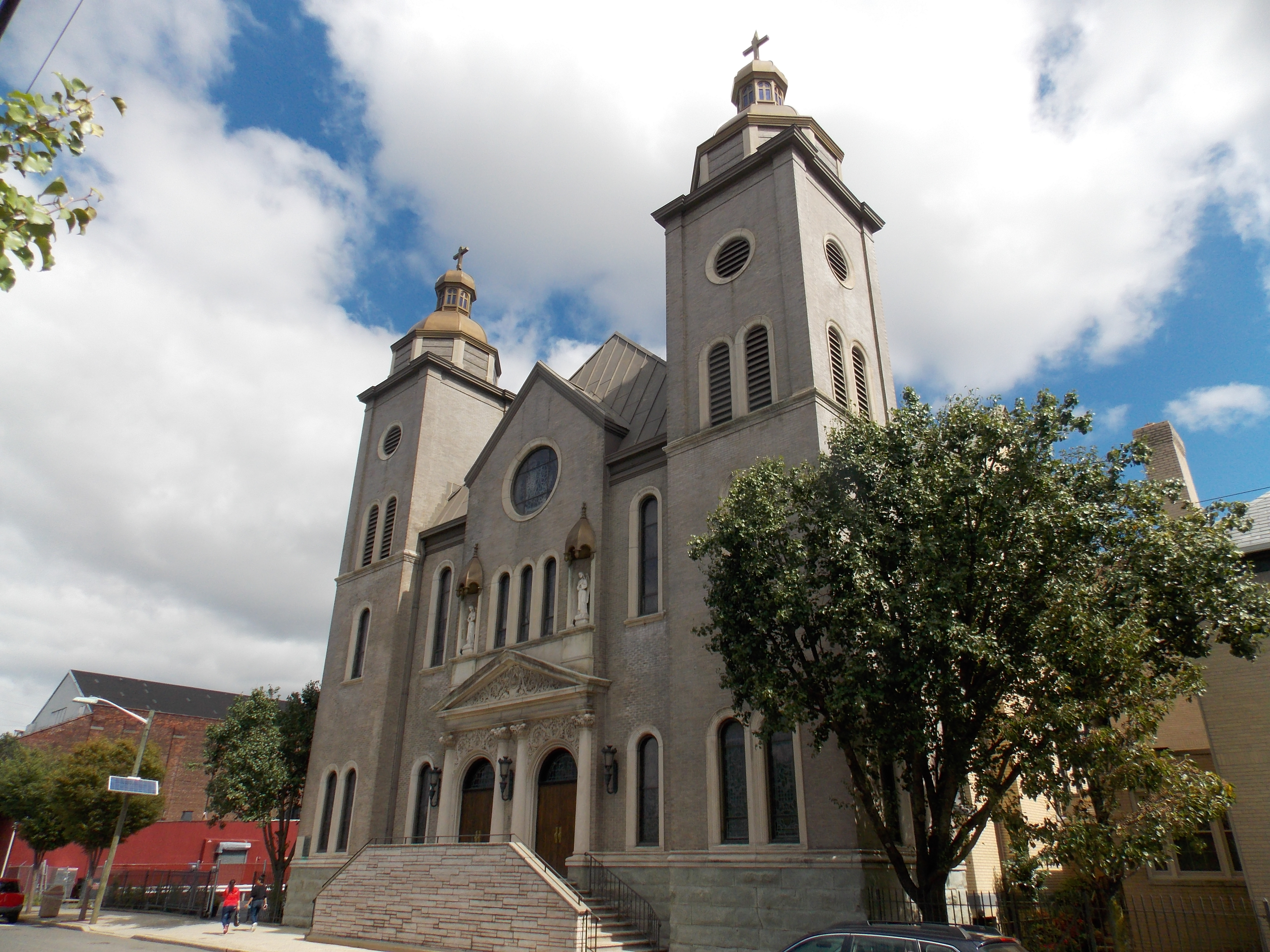
- Cathedral of St. Michael the Archangel

Location
- Country: United States
- Ecclesiastical province: Metropolis of Pittsburgh
- Metropolitan: William C. Skurla

Statistics
- Population: (as of 2009); 17,629
- Parishes: 84

Information
- Denomination: Catholic Church
- Sui iuris church: Ruthenian Greek Catholic Church
- Rite: Byzantine Rite
- Established: July 6, 1963 (63 years ago)
- Cathedral: Cathedral of St. Michael the Archangel

Current leadership
- Pope: Leo XIV
- Eparch: Kurt Burnette

Map
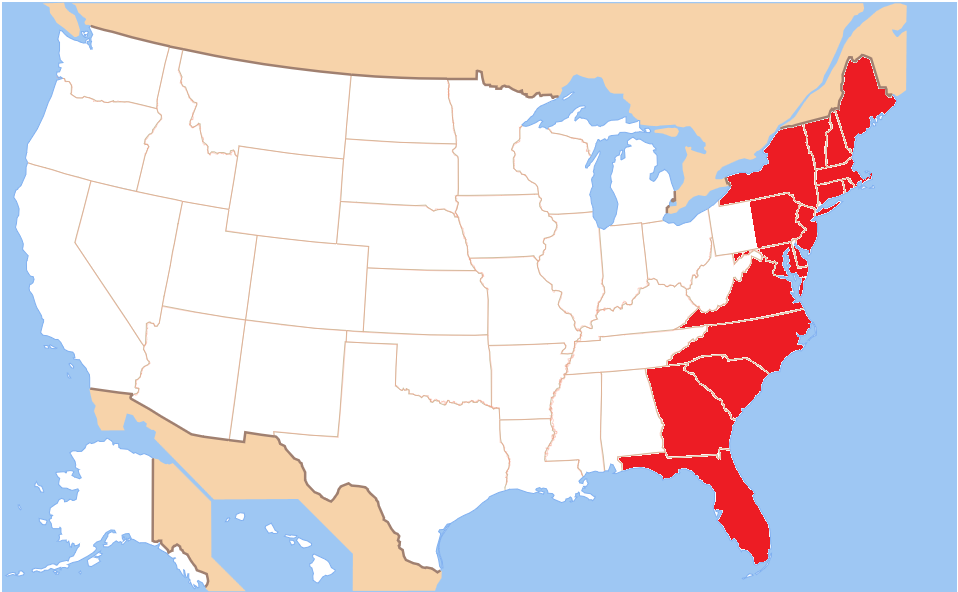

Website
- eparchyofpassaic.com

The Eparchy of Passaic (Latin: Eparchia Passaicensis Ruthenorum) is an eparchy (diocese) of the Ruthenian Greek Catholic Church on the Atlantic seaboard of the United States. Its episcopal seat is the Cathedral of St. Michael the Archangel in Passaic, New Jersey. As an Eastern Catholic church, it uses the Byzantine Rite in its services. The Eparchy was erected July 6, 1963.

It is a suffragan diocese of the Archeparchy of Pittsburgh in the ecclesiastical province of Pittsburgh. The metropolis is dependent upon the Roman Congregation for the Oriental Churches). Its headquarters are at 445 Lackawanna Avenue, Woodland Park, New Jersey (formerly West Paterson).

On October 29, 2013, Pope Francis appointed Father Kurt Burnette, until then the Rector of Saints Cyril and Methodius Seminary, in Pittsburgh, Pennsylvania (since October 2012), as Eparch-elect of the Eparchy, succeeding William Skurla. The eparchy's first bishop was Stephen Kocisko. Currently, the Eparchy has 89 parishes under its canonical jurisdiction.

== Eparchs ==
- Stephen John Kocisko † (July 6, 1963 - December 22, 1967) Appointed, Eparch of Pittsburgh (Ruthenian)
- Michael Joseph Dudick † (July 29, 1968 - November 6, 1995) Retired
- Andrew Pataki † (November 6, 1995 - December 6, 2007) Retired
- William C. Skurla (December 6, 2007 - January 19, 2012) Appointed, Archeparch of Pittsburgh (Ruthenian)
- Kurt Burnette (December 4, 2013 – Present)

== Parishes ==
The eparchy encompasses parishes located in the following states:

- Connecticut
- Florida
- Georgia
- Maryland
- New Jersey
- New York
- North Carolina
- Pennsylvania (eastern counties)
- South Carolina
- Virginia

== Bishops ==
=== Ordinaries ===
- Stephen John Kocisko (1963-1967), appointed Bishop of Pittsburgh (Ruthenian)
- Michael Joseph Dudick (1968-1995)
- Andrew Pataki (1995-2007)
- William Charles Skurla (2007-2013), appointed Archbishop of Pittsburgh (Ruthenian)
- Kurt Richard Burnette (2013-

=== Other priests of this eparchy who became bishop ===
- Gerald Nicholas Dino, appointed Bishop of Van Nuys (Ruthenian) in 2007

== See also ==
- Byzantine Catholic Metropolitan Church of Pittsburgh
- Byzantine Catholic Archeparchy of Pittsburgh
- Byzantine Catholic Eparchy of Parma
- Byzantine Catholic Eparchy of Phoenix
- Byzantine Catholic Exarchate of Saints Cyril and Methodius of Toronto
- List of the Catholic bishops of the United States § Eastern Catholic eparchs
