= Carpatho-Rusyn Society =

Cultural heritage non-profit

Symbol of the Carpatho-Rusyn Society, which is a modified version of the coat of arms approved by the Academy of Rusyn Culture

The Carpatho-Rusyn Society (C-RS; Rusyn: Карпато-Русинськоє Общество) is a non-profit cultural organization located in the United States dedicated to promoting Carpatho-Rusyn culture and history. It was established in Pittsburgh in 1994 and is the largest exclusively Carpatho-Rusyn organization in North America with over 3,000 members.

C-RS works to educate those of Rusyn descent as well as others about Carpatho-Rusyn heritage. The society supports the preservation and development of Rusyn culture on both sides of the Atlantic. It is a 501(c)(3) Public Charity; in 2024 it claimed total assets of $388,435 and total revenue of $110,344.

== Establishment ==
The impetus for development of C-RS emanated from the Second World Congress of Rusyns held in Krynica, Poland in 1993. The new society built upon the inclusive approaches of other American Carpatho-Rusyn organizations, particularly the Carpatho-Rusyn Research Center founded in 1978 by Paul Robert Magocsi and the Rusin Association founded by Larry Goga in 1983.

Formed by fourth and third generation Carpatho-Rusyn Americans, the C-RS was created to promote Carpatho-Rusyn heritage and history. The society highlights the experience of Carpatho-Rusyns, a stateless group whose homeland experienced frequent geopolitical shifts, using the description "a people from nowhere" attributed to artist, Andy Warhol.

The society's logo prominently features the Carpatho-Rusyn national emblem as its symbol, a red bear facing blue and gold stripes. This shield was first adopted as the official emblem of the Czechoslovak province of Subcarpathian Rus' on March 30, 1920. It fell into disuse after Nazi Germany's dismembering of Czechoslovakia in 1938 but was adopted later as the official symbol of the Transcarpathian oblast of Ukraine on December 18, 1990. The emblem's left field is divided into 7 horizontal blue and gold alternating stripes representing the seven largest rivers of the land: the Tysa, Teresva, Tereblya, Rika, Borzhava, Latorica and Uzh. Opposite the stripes stands a red bear, placed there erroneously, based on the belief of heraldic commission member Gustav Friedrich that it had been on the Uzhhorod coat of arms, while behind the shield is silver. These colours on the coat of arms were selected by the heraldic commission of the Ministry of the Interior of Czechoslovakia as a compromise between Ukrainophiles and Russophiles.

== Early years ==
The society expanded rapidly from its eight original founders. This growth necessitated a newsletter for its members, The New Rusyn Times. In addition to promoting self-awareness of Carpatho-Rusyn identity, the mission of C-RS 'holds in high esteem the continuity of life which connects the living Rusyn culture to its treasured and ancient heritage'. Through its growing membership, the society promoted opportunities to learn, express, and enjoy the beauty and life affirming values of a living Carpatho-Rusyn heritage.

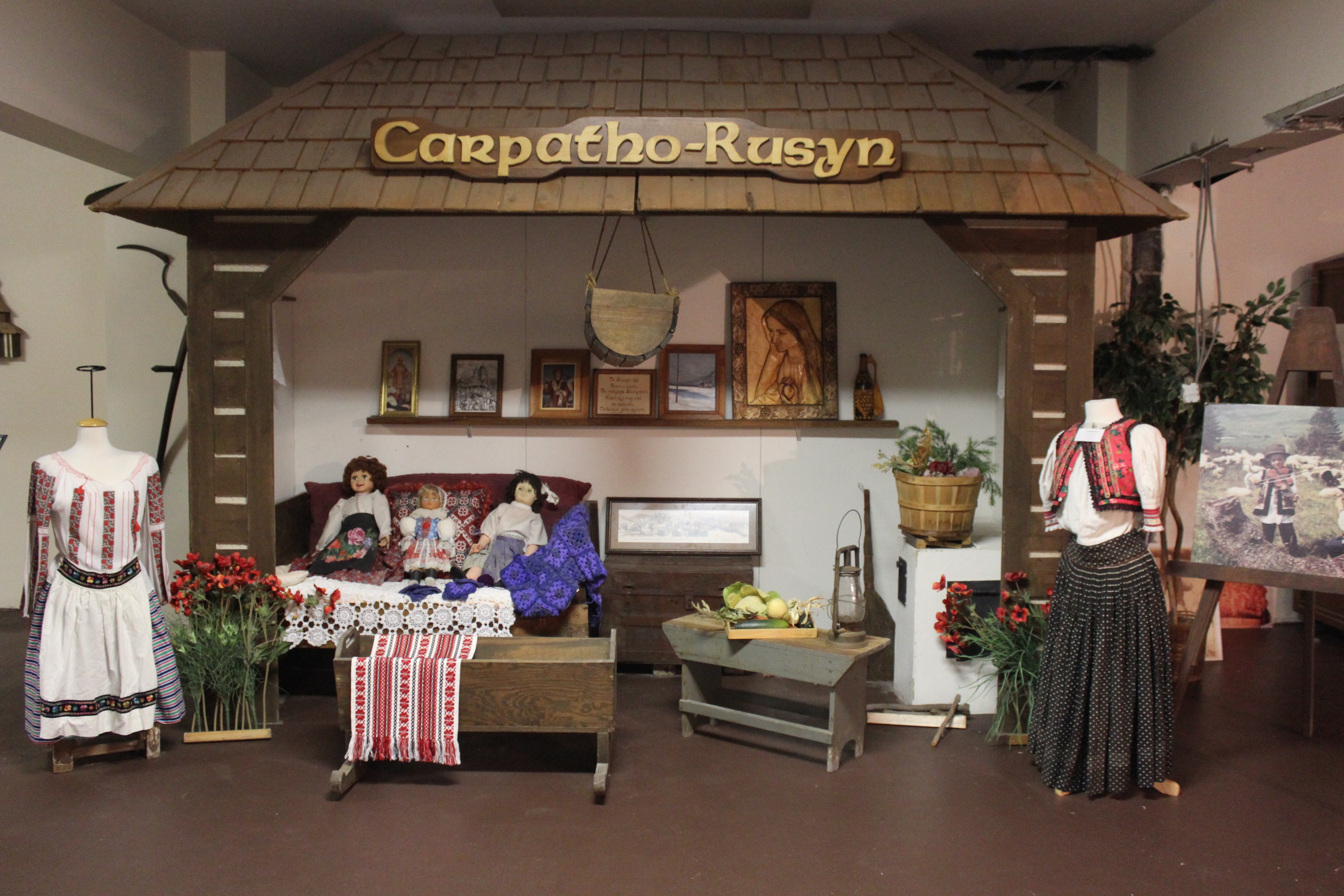
Carpatho-Rusyn Folk Exhibit

C-RS has hosted conferences on Carpatho-Rusyn history and genealogy and has managed the Carpatho-Rusyn cultural display at the Pittsburgh Folk Festival. The society co-sponsored a national Carpatho-Rusyn cultural celebration at the Andy Warhol Museum in Pittsburgh and provides traveling displays of Rusyn culture for church and ethnic festivals.

One of C-RS's greatest early successes was in reestablishing relations with the European Carpatho-Rusyn community and supporting their efforts to resurrect and develop Carpatho-Rusyn culture after fifty years of Communist persecution. The society has two European funds – Humanitarian Aid and the Rusyn Homeland Fund.

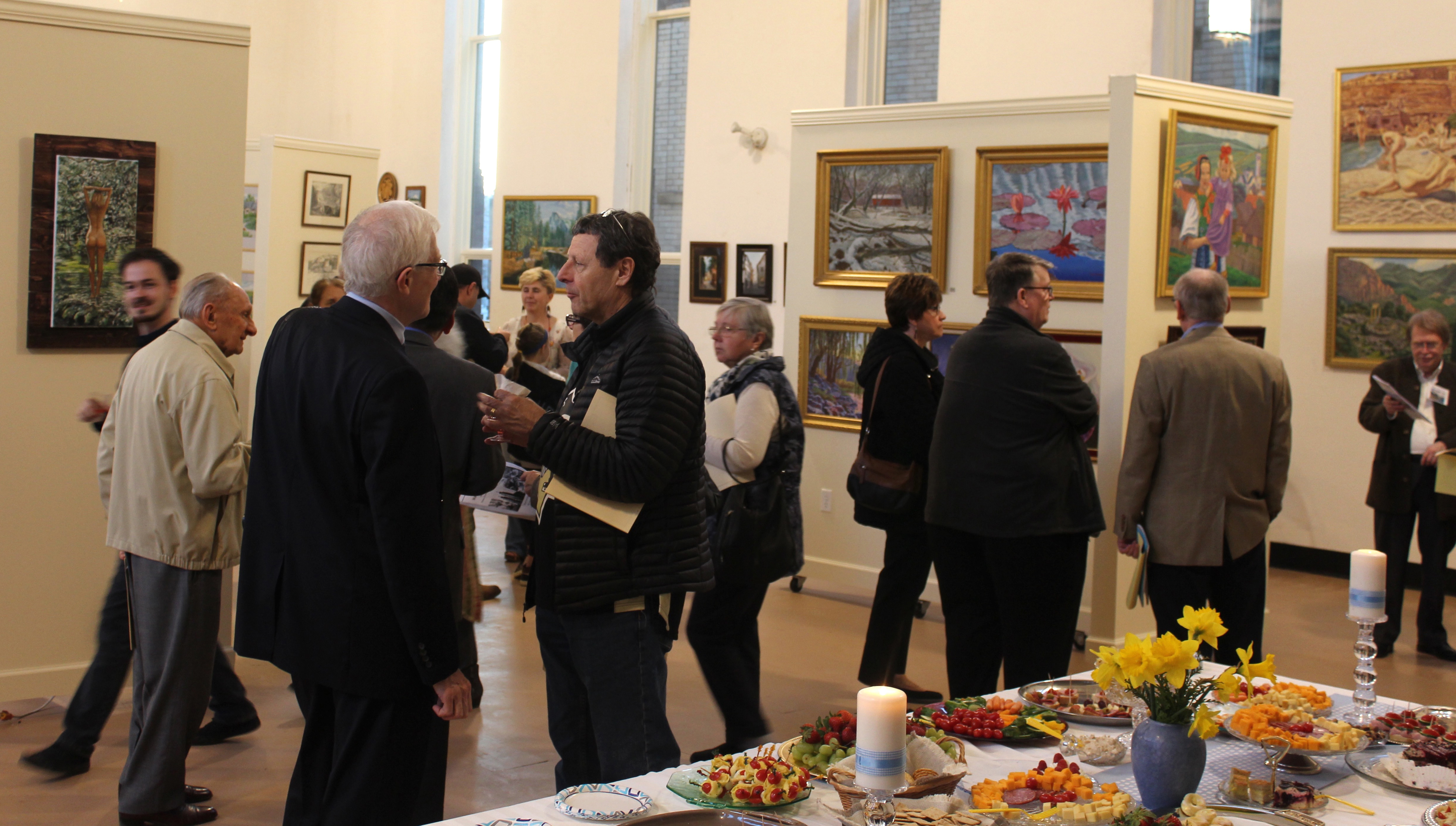
C-RS exhibition of Carpatho-Rusyn Art

The Humanitarian Aid Fund was created in 1996 when Carpatho-Rusyn villages in the Transcarpathian oblast of Ukraine experienced an unexpected late fall flood killing 17 and leaving hundreds homeless. Through its members, C-RS worked with the American Red Cross to set up relief for the people of Subcarpathian Rus'. Since then the fund sends primarily medical supplies to healthcare professionals in Transcarpathia for those in need.

The society's Rusyn Homeland Fund provided comprehensive support to the Carpatho-Rusyn community in eastern Slovakia at a critical time before the 2001 census to heighten ethnic awareness of those of Carpatho-Rusyn heritage. The fund underwrote the printing of maps showing Carpatho-Rusyn villages, a traveling display of Carpatho-Rusyn culture, and the widespread mailing of Rusyn-language newspapers and magazines to Carpatho-Rusyn households. Consequently, the number of Slovak citizens identifying as Carpatho-Rusyn increased dramatically compared with the previous census of 1991. The fund also provided financial support to help create a network of Rusyn language schools in Transcarpathia, Ukraine.

== Moving forward ==
The founding president of C-RS was John Righetti who served until 2012 and is now president emeritus. He was succeeded by Jim Kepchar-Kaminski (2013-2015), Maryann Sivak (2015–2023), and Sharron Jarrow (2023-2025). The current president since 2025 is Mary Ann Sromoski. The organization currently consists of 9 active chapters located throughout the United States.

C-RS seeks to collaborate with all Carpatho-Rusyn organizations worldwide to disseminate historical, genealogical, linguistic and ethno-cultural information. In addition to its newsletter, the society created a website, blog and e-mail bulletin, C-RS Connection. Since 2004, the Carpatho-Rusyn Society Heritage Program has broadcast Carpatho-Rusyn music and information on WPIT in the greater Pittsburgh area and worldwide via the web. The society currently hosts a genealogy forum on its website and is expanding its social media presence.

Programs that have served both the Carpatho-Rusyn American and European communities include the highly successful Rusyn Heritage Tour. The society has promoted an annual two- week tour of the Carpatho-Rusyn communities in Poland, Slovakia and Ukraine. The tour experience is one of immersion in contemporary Rusyn culture as well as allowing for visits to ancestral villages and genealogical research. Since 2011, C-RS has supported and offered scholarships to the Studium Carpato-Ruthenorum, an annual international summer school for Rusyn language and culture held at Presov University.

=== National Cultural Center ===
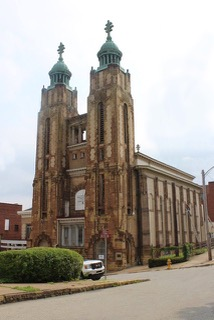
Carpatho-Rusyn Cultural and Educational Center, Munhall, PA

In 2004, C-RS purchased the former St. John the Baptist Byzantine Catholic Cathedral at 915 Dickson Street in Munhall, Pennsylvania and converted it into the Carpatho-Rusyn Cultural and Educational Center. The century-old building holds significance for those of Carpatho-Rusyn heritage. It was designed in 1903 by Hungarian-born architect Titus de Bobula and was patterned after the Carpatho-Rusyn Greek Catholic Cathedral of the Exaltation of the Holy Cross in Uzhhorod (then Ungvár, Kingdom of Hungary). In 1929, the building was chosen as the cathedral for the Ruthenian (Rusyn) Greek Catholic Exarchate in America.

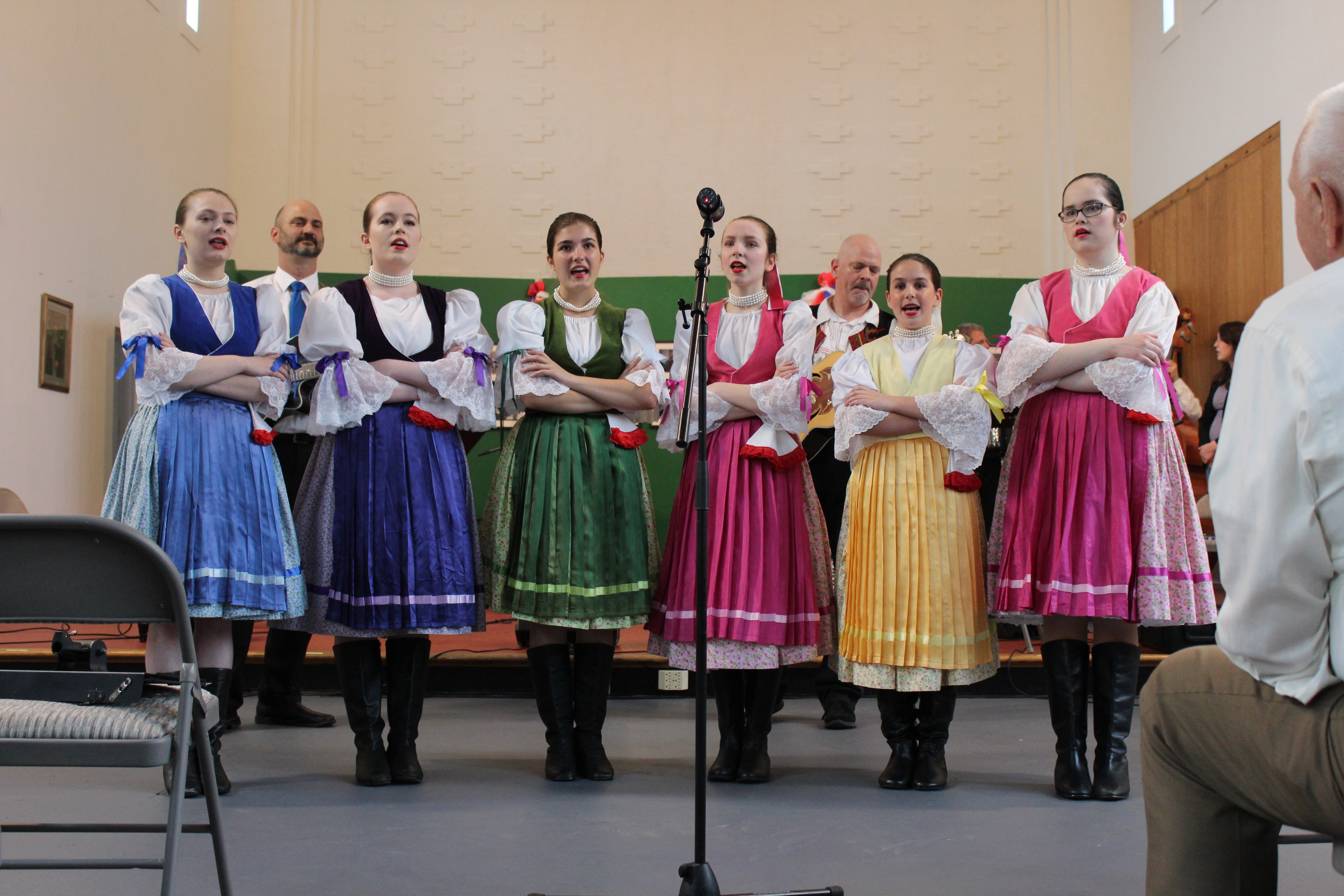
Slavjane Folk Ensemble performance at C-RS 25th Anniversary celebration

In May 2019, the society celebrated its 25th anniversary at its renovated cultural center. Professor Paul Robert Magocsi, the world's foremost authority on Carpatho-Rusyns, gave the keynote address and received the society's highest honor, the Michael Strank Award, named after the Carpatho-Rusyn-American Marine sergeant who helped raise the US flag at the Battle of Iwo Jima. A native of Orjabyna (Jarabina), Czechoslovakia, Strank was awarded US citizenship posthumously in 2008. Prior recipients of the Michael Strank Award were Orestes Mihaly (2009) and John Righetti (2014).

== See also ==
- Alexander Dukhnovych
- Gregory Zatkovich
- Rusyn Americans
- List of Rusyn-Americans
- Ruthenia
- Lemkos
- Boykos
- Hutsuls
- Pannonian Rusyn
- Union of Uzhhorod
- Ruthenian Greek Catholic
- American Carpatho-Russian Orthodox Diocese
- Greek Catholic Union
