= List of Rusyn Americans =

This is a list of notable Rusyn Americans.

To be included in this list, the person must have a Wikipedia article showing they are Rusyn American or must have references showing they are Rusyn American and are notable.

== List ==
- Sandra Dee, actress (Rusyn mother)
- Steve Ditko, comic book illustrator and co-creator of Spider-Man (Rusyn father)
- Harry Dorish, professional baseball player, St. Louis Browns (Rusyn father, "Slovak" mother)
- Bill Evans, jazz musician (Rusyn mother)
- Nick Holonyak, creator of the LED (both parents Rusyn)
- Thomas Hopko, Orthodox Christian theologian
- John Kanzius, inventor (Rusyn American mother)
- Paul Robert Magocsi
- Bret Michaels, singer-songwriter and musician (Rusyn paternal grandfather)
- Wentworth Miller, actor (mother's ancestry includes Rusyn ancestors)
- Stan Musial, professional baseball player, St. Louis Cardinals (Rusyn mother, Polish father)
- Benjamin Orr, musician (Rusyn mother from present day Kojšov, Slovakia and Ukrainian father)
- Tom Ridge, politician (Rusyn mother)
- George Sabo, book dealer (Rusyn immigrant)
- Lizabeth Scott, actress (both parents Rusyn)
- Mark Singel, politician (Rusyn father)
- Andrew P. Skumanich, astro-physicist (Rusyn parents)
- Laurus Škurla, First Hierarch of the Russian Orthodox Church Outside Russia, metropolitan of Eastern America and New York
- John Spencer, actor (Rusyn mother)
- Michael Strank, U.S Marine soldier known for being in the Raising the Flag on Iwo Jima photograph (born in Czechoslovakia to Rusyn parents)
- Robert Urich, actor (Rusyn father)
- Stephen Varzaly, (1890 – 1957) leading priest, journalist, and cultural activist for Rusyns in the United States.
- George Toma Grounds keeper for the Kansas City Chiefs and Kansas City Royals. (both parents of Rusyn ancestry)
- Andy Warhol, artist (both parents Rusyn)
- James Warhola, illustrator
- Peter Wilhousky, composer (both parents Rusyn)
- Craig Wycinsky, professional football player for Cleveland Browns
- Gregory Zatkovich, lawyer and political activist (Rusyn immigrant)
- Paul Zatkovich, newspaper editor and cultural activist (Rusyn immigrant)
- Chris Zylka, actor, director, producer and model (maternal grandmother, Patricia Rosko, born into a family of Ruthenian/Rusyn/Slovak heritage)
