= Žatkovich =

Žatkovich, Zatkovich, or Zhatkovich (Rusyn: Жатковіч) is a surname. Notable people with the surname include a father and son:

- Paul Zatkovich (1852–1916), American activist for Rusyns and newspaper editor
- Gregory Žatkovich (1886–1967), American activist for Rusyns and lawyer
