= Stephen Varzaly =

Stephen Varzaly (1890 – 1957) was a leading priest, journalist, and cultural activist for Rusyns in the United States.

== Early life ==
Varzaly was born October 6, 1890, in the village of Fulianka, Austria-Hungary (now Slovakia) and studied at the Greek Catholic Seminary in Prešov. Varzaly married Anna Ilona Kristof. The couple had 7 children. Eugene Varzaly, Stephen Varzaly, Jr.; George Varzaly; Adela Varzaly Matiak; Dolores Varzaly Amman; Martha Varzaly Gaydos; Maria Louisa Varzaly Lazor. He was ordained November 7, 1915, and served in several Rusyn parishes during World War I.

In 1920 Varzaly was offered his choice of assignment to the cathedral in Budapest or of a church in New Castle, Pennsylvania. In 1920 he emigrated to the United States on assignment to St. Nicholas Greek Catholic Church in New Castle, Pennsylvania. In 1921 his wife and three children (Eugene, Stephen and Adela who were born in Fulianka) followed. He moved in 1932 to the parish of Saint Michael's Greek Catholic Church in Rankin, Pennsylvania.

== Controversy over married clergy ==
Greek Rite Catholicism in the United States, which began in the 1880s with large-scale emigration from Eastern Europe, was until 1914 administered by the American Roman Catholic hierarchy, which instituted a subtle campaign to Latinize its conduct.

Fearing that married Greek Catholic priests might cause envy among celibate Roman Catholic priests, Pope Pius X in 1907 issued an apostolic letter enjoining celibacy upon all Catholic priests in the U.S. Many Greek Catholics argued that by the 1646 Union of Uzhhorod their clergy had been granted the right to marry before ordination, and the decree was unenforced.

The Holy See issued a second decree in 1929 entitled Cum Data Fuerit, which reiterated Rome's previous position that the Greek Catholic clergy in America must be celibate.

Basil Takach (1879–1948), the first bishop of the Byzantine Catholic Metropolitan Church of Pittsburgh, the American branch of the Ruthenian Greek Catholic Church, opposed the new decree, but his appeals were rebuffed by Rome.

== Varzaly as journalist and dissident ==
From 1930 to 1937 Varzaly served as editor-in-chief of Amerikansky Russky Viestnik (1892—1952), the longest-running Rusyn-American newspaper in America and the official publication of the Greek Catholic Union of Rusyn Brotherhoods, a fraternal benefit society based in Pennsylvania.

Many Carpatho-Rusyns, including Varzaly, believed clerical celibacy to be so inherently unnatural as to lead inevitably to promiscuity and sexual abuse. During the celibacy conflict Varzaly used the newspaper to argue against Cum Data Fuerit and for continuation of a traditional married clergy within the Church. He joined, eventually, with other clergy and laity to formally fight the Pope's decree, and they all were suspended from the Church.

== American Carpatho-Rusyn Diocese ==
Varzaly backed the 1936 formation of the American Carpatho-Russian Orthodox Diocese, but by 1949 left to support a newly created Carpatho-Russian People's Church under the jurisdiction of the Russian Orthodox Church in North America.

In 1937, Varzaly—by then stationed for six years at St. Michael Greek Catholic Church in Rankin, Pennsylvania, in Pittsburgh's Monongahela Valley—joined three dozen other Byzantine rite priests to form a Carpatho-Rusyn diocese independent of Rome and the Latin rite bishops of the United States. The first bishop, Orestes Chornock, was elected by his fellow priests and consecrated the following year by Orthodox bishops of the Holy Synod of the Ecumenical Patriarchate in Constantinople. Varzaly served as treasurer for the new diocese. He took his role seriously as guardian of the funds contributed by the largely impoverished faithful, refusing to sign checks for expenditures he believed inappropriate. This sparked controversy and lawsuits, but Varzaly prevailed in each.

Varzaly did not believe a juridical break with Rome to be sufficient, however. On the pages of his newsletter Vistnik ("The Messenger") and in diocesan councils he argued for the elimination of Latinizations in the liturgy and popular devotions that had become part of the Eastern Church's practice over the course of centuries living alongside Western Catholics.

The touchstone for authentic Eastern practice was held to be that of the Russian Orthodox Church. Varzaly and others argued that the preservation of Eastern tradition demanded an end to devotions of western origin such as the Stations of the Cross and the rosary.

Gradually, devotions of western origin disappeared from Orthodox practice; their standing remains the subject of debate among Byzantine Catholics to this day. Changes to Divine Liturgy, although less dramatic than those made at roughly the same time by Orthodox Ukrainians, moved Carpatho-Rusyn practice closer to that of the Russian Orthodox Church. In contrast to the earlier split led by Father Alexis Toth—who led his flock into the Russian Church in both jurisdiction and practice—distinctive Rusyn elements remained in the liturgy.

This search for a liturgical and devotional life shorn of Western accretions led Rev. Varzaly to re-examine his earlier positions about the proper standing of the new Carpatho-Rusyn diocese within worldwide Orthodoxy. Once an advocate of submission "neither to Rome nor Moscow," by 1950 he was making the case that since it was to the Patriarchate of Moscow to which the people turned for the pure form of the Eastern liturgy, the independent Carpatho-Rusyn church ought to look to Moscow, the "Third Rome" rather than to the remnant of ethnic Greeks representing the ancient patriarchates of Constantinople and Antioch in a modern Turkey that seemed no longer remotely hospitable to Christians.

This was a controversial position among the Carpatho-Rusyns. While none disputed that their people were Slavs, the Carpatho-Rus had been largely untouched by the pan-Slav movement of the previous century. Constantinople, moreover, was the Mother Church of the East, an imperial city when Moscow was a collection of mud huts on the banks of the Moskva River. By turning to the Ecumenical Patriarch in Constantinople, moreover, they could legitimize their position as an Orthodox church with little chance that they would be prevented from running their own affairs.

1950 was not the most auspicious time for a naturalized American to be arguing in favor of submission to guidance, much less instruction, from Moscow. Rev. Varzaly's rivals in the church were not slow to capitalize on that and in short order, the FBI surveilled him as a pro-Russian and pro-Communist sympathizer during the Red Scare of the 1950s and he ultimately testified before Congress about his activities. Nothing came of the charges. A review of two years' of his writings not only found nothing "subversive", even by the somewhat hysterical standards of the day, but prompted a letter of apology from the federal government for its being drawn into an internal and essentially religious dispute.

Varzaly died June 3, 1957, in Pittsburgh's Montefiore Hospital. He is interred in Homewood Cemetery, a nonsectarian burial ground in Pittsburgh.
