= St. John the Baptist Byzantine Catholic Cathedral (Pittsburgh) =

Ruthenian Greek Catholic cathedral in the US

St. John the Baptist Cathedral
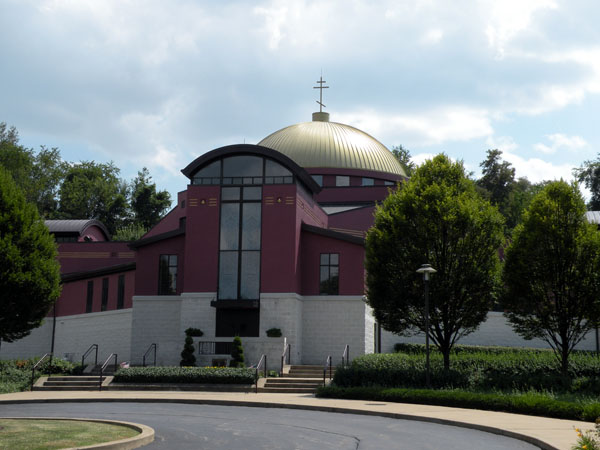
- St. John the Baptist Byzantine Catholic Cathedral

- Location within Pennsylvania Location within the United States
- 40.3821°N 79.9153°W
- Location: 210 Greentree Road; Munhall, Pennsylvania
- Country: United States
- Denomination: Catholic Church
- Sui iuris church: Ruthenian Greek Catholic Church
- Website: www.stjohnsbyzantinecathedral.com

History
- Founded: 1897

Architecture
- Completed: 1993

Administration
- Diocese: Archeparchy of Pittsburgh

Clergy
- Bishop: William C. Skurla
- Rector: Very Reverend Andrew J. Deskevich

St. John the Baptist Byzantine Catholic Cathedral is the mother church of Ruthenian Greek Catholic Church. It is located at 210 Greentree Road in Munhall, Pennsylvania, a suburb of Pittsburgh in the Monongahela River valley.

== History ==
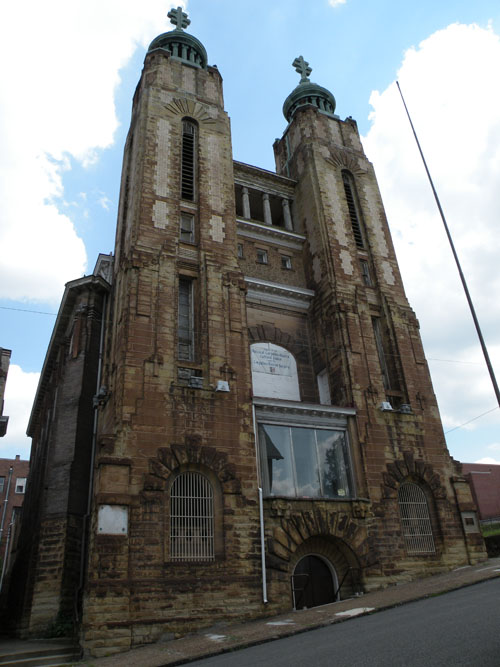
National Carpatho-Rusyn Cultural and Educational Center, which was the first St. John the Baptist Byzantine Catholic Cathedral. It is located at 911 Dickson Street in Munhall, Pennsylvania. Built in 1903, architect Titus de Bobula.

Beginning in the 1880s, tens of thousands of Rusyns from the Carpathian Mountains flocked to Pittsburgh to work in its steel industry, especially Andrew Carnegie's large steel mill at Homestead, Pennsylvania. In 1894—two years after the infamous and bloody Homestead Strike—the large Rusyn community of Homestead met to discuss the formation of a church. In January 1897 the new church was officially chartered and dedicated as St. John the Baptist Greek Catholic Church.

== The first cathedral, 1903 ==
In need of a larger church, in the summer of 1902 two lots were acquired on the corner of Tenth and Dicksons Streets in the newly created (from Homestead) borough of Munhall. It was designed by the Hungarian-born architect, Titus de Bobula, and patterned after the Rusyn Greek Catholic Cathedral of the Exaltation of the Holy Cross in Ungvár, Austria-Hungary (today Uzhhorod, Ukraine). The church's twin towers, which rise 125 feet (38 m), are composed of white brick in a Greek cruciform pattern set into sandstone. They rise 125 feet (38 m). The church was dedicated on December 27, 1903 under Co-Adjutor Bishop Regis Canevin of the Roman Catholic Diocese of Pittsburgh, which then had jurisdiction over Greek Catholics in its region.

The congregation grew to more than 700 families in the 1920s. In 1929 it was chosen as the cathedral for the newly created Ruthenian Greek Catholic Exarchate in America. The historic structure was the first cathedral in America exclusively for Carpatho-Rusyns.

In the 1950s the parish began the task of renovating and modernizing the Cathedral. While the renovation progressed, Divine Liturgy was held in the school auditorium. Msgr. John Gernat, who served as rector from 1959 to 1963, completed the renovation.

== The second cathedral, 1993 ==
Msgr. Judson Procyk became the rector of the Cathedral parish on July 18, 1973. As rector, Msgr. Procyk led a plan to relocate the parish and build a brand new Cathedral. In 1978, the parish acquired 18 acres (73,000 m^{2}) of property off Greentree Road in Munhall and built the current Cathedral, which was completed in 1993.

In 2004, the 1903 Cathedral was sold to the Carpatho-Rusyn Society, which uses it for its headquarters and as a cultural center.

== See also ==
- List of Catholic cathedrals in the United States
- List of cathedrals in the United States
