= New Rusyn Times =

Carpatho-Rusyn Society publication

The New Rusyn Times is the English-language membership publication of the Carpatho-Rusyn Society, an American nonprofit organization promoting Rusyn culture in the United States as well in the homeland in east Eastern Europe.

Established in 1994 in Pittsburgh, Pennsylvania, The New Rusyn Times is published quarterly. It was previously published on a bimonthly basis. The current editor is Iva Fedorka.

== See also ==
- Ruthenia
- Carpathian Ruthenia
