= Paul Zatkovich =

Paul J. Zatkovich
- Born: 1852; Ungvár, Kingdom of Hungary, Austrian Empire
- Died: October 8, 1916 (aged 63–64); Brooklyn, NY
- Resting place: Pottsville, Pennsylvania
- Education: Royal Gymnasium, Uzhhorod
- Employer: Amerikansky Russky Viestnik
- Title: editor
- Spouse: Irma Zlockij
- Children: Gregory Zatkovich, Theophil Zatkovich
- Parent: George Zatkovich

Paul Zatkovich (Note: Rusyn: Павло Жаткович, romanized: Pavlo Zhatkovych) (1852–1916) was a newspaper editor and cultural activist for Rusyns in the United States.

He was born in Ungvár, in the Ung County of the Kingdom of Hungary (present-day Uzhhorod, Ukraine), where his father George Zatkovich was a professor in a school for cantors of the Ruthenian Greek Catholic Church. He was educated in the Royal Gymnasium at Ungwar and later completed a course in notarial studies. He then worked as a notary public for fifteen years in various Rusyn villages. He married Irma Zlockij and they had six children.

He emigrated to Pennsylvania in 1891 and was among the founders of the Greek Catholic Union of Rusyn Brotherhoods, a fraternal benefit association. He was the founding editor of its newspaper, Amerikansky Russky Viestnik.

His son Gregory Zatkovich played a leading role for Rusyns during the establishment of the nation of Czechoslovakia.

Paul Zatkovich died in Brooklyn, New York, on October 8, 1916, and was buried in Pottsville, Pennsylvania.
