= Fulianka =

Village and municipality in Prešov District in Slovakia

- Municipality
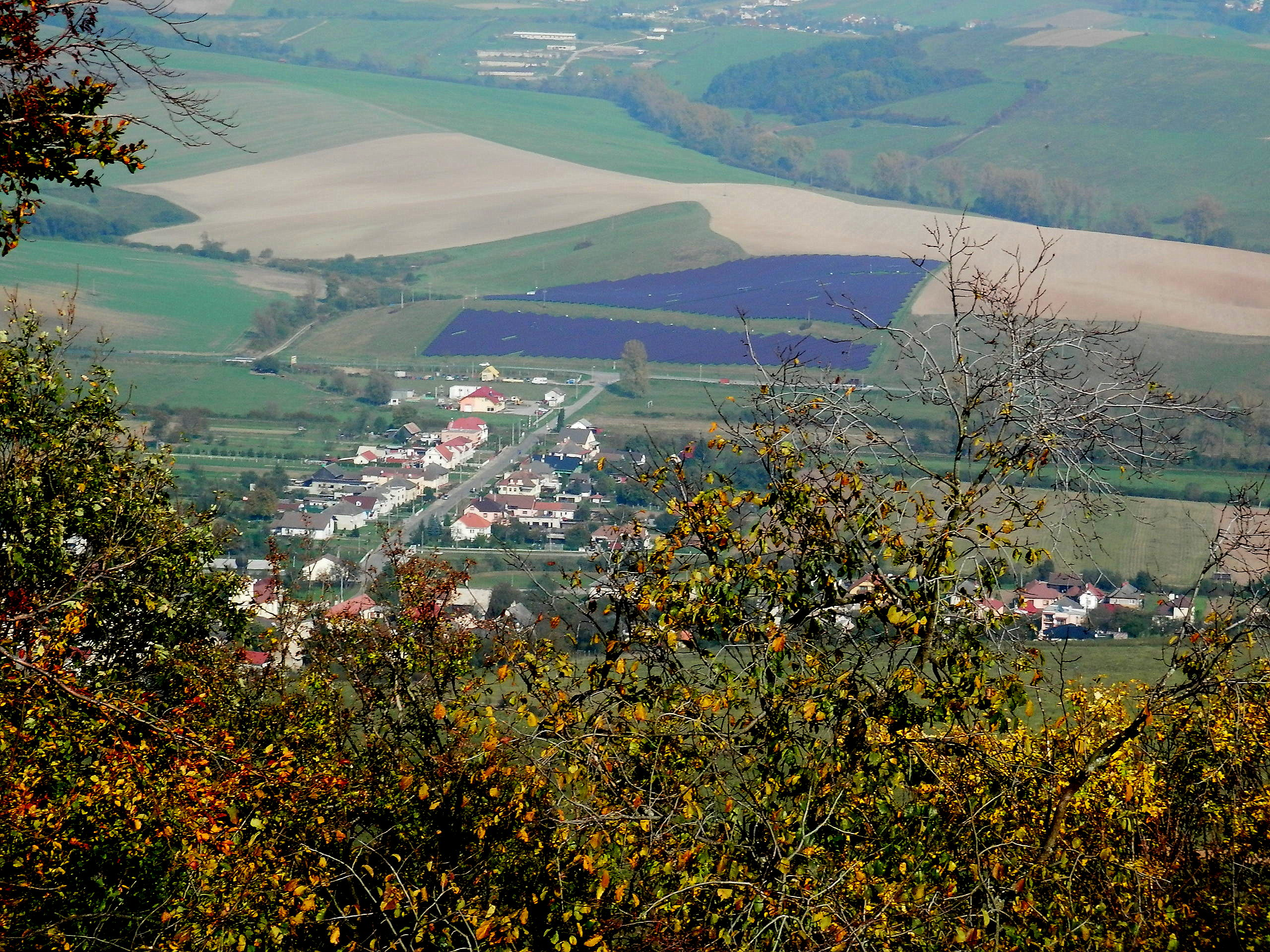

- Flag

- Location of Fulianka in the Prešov Region Location of Fulianka in Slovakia
- Coordinates: 49.07°N 21.33°E
- Country: Slovakia
- Region: Prešov Region
- District: Prešov District
- First mentioned: 1410

Area
  - Total: 3.80 km^{2} (1.47 sq mi)
- Elevation: 271 m (889 ft)

Population (2025)
  - Total: 422
- Time zone: UTC+1 (CET)
  - Summer (DST): UTC+2 (CEST)
- Postal code: 821 2
- Area code: +421 51
- Vehicle registration plate (until 2022): PO
- Website: www.fulianka.sk

Fulianka (Hungarian: Fulyán) is a village and municipality in Prešov District in the Prešov Region of eastern Slovakia.

== History ==
In historical records the village was first mentioned in 1410.

== Geography ==
The municipality lies at an altitude of 271 metres (889 ft) and covers an area of 3.80 km^{2} (1.47 sq mi) (2025).

== Population ==
Population statistic (10 years)
Year	1995	2005	2015	2025
Count	363	387	390	422
Difference		+6.61%	+0.77%	+8.20%

Population statistic
Year	2024	2025
Count	417	422
Difference		+1.19%

It has a population of 422 people (31 December 2025).

=== Ethnicity ===
Census 2021 (1+ %)
Ethnicity	Number	Fraction
Slovak	406	98.78%
Rusyn	6	1.45%
Total	411	

In year 2021 was 411 people by ethnicity 406 as Slovak, 6 as Rusyn, 3 as Not found out, 3 as Other and 1 as Polish.

Note on population: The difference values of population numbers in the table "Population statistic" and in the sections "Ethnicity" & "Religion" is caused by the use of various statistical methods.

=== Religion ===
Census 2021 (1+ %)
Religion	Number	Fraction
Roman Catholic Church	197	47.93%
Greek Catholic Church	167	40.63%
None	26	6.33%
Evangelical Church	6	1.46%
Total	411	

In year 2021 was 411 people by religion 197 from Roman Catholic Church, 167 from Greek Catholic Church, 26 from None, 6 from Evangelical Church, 4 from Ad hoc movements, 3 from Other and not ascertained christian church, 3 from Not found out, 2 from Other, 1 from Calvinist Church, 1 from United Methodist Church and 1 from Buddhism.

== Genealogical resources ==
The records for genealogical research are available at the state archive "Statny Archiv in Presov, Slovakia"

- Roman Catholic church records (births/marriages/deaths): 1864–1895 (parish B)
- Greek Catholic church records (births/marriages/deaths): 1818–1895 (parish A)

== See also ==
- List of municipalities and towns in Slovakia
