= Amerikansky Russky Viestnik =

- Founder: Paul Zatkovich
- Founded: 1892
- Ceased publication: 1952
- Language: Slovak, Rusyn, English
- Headquarters: Scranton, Pennsylvania
- Sister newspapers: succeeded by Greek Catholic Union Messenger
- OCLC number: 2257475

Amerikansky Russky Viestnik (1892–1952) was the longest-running Rusyn-American newspaper in the United States.

The paper was the official publication of the Greek Catholic Union of Rusyn Brotherhoods, a fraternal benefit society based in Pennsylvania. Its founding editor was Paul Zatkovich (1892–1914), who was followed by Michael Hanchin (1914–1920), George Jurion Thegze (1920–1929), Father Stefan Varzaly (1929–1936), and Michael Roman (1937–1952).

It was published in both Cyrillic and Roman-alphabet editions. In 1952 it was replaced with the English-language Greek Catholic Union Messenger, which ran until 1992.
