= Titus de Bobula =

American architect

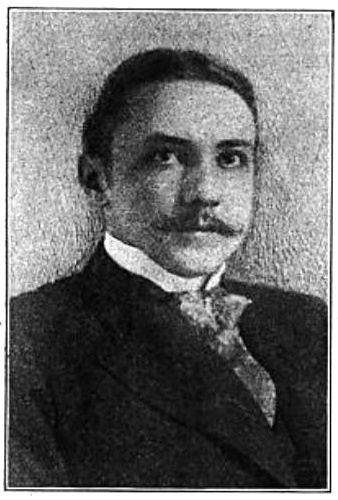
de Bobula in 1905

Titus de Bobula (24 December 1878 – 1961) was a Hungarian-American architect, businessman, and political activist. Born in Hungary, he had a brief but brilliant career as a pioneer of Art Nouveau and the Vienna Secession in the United States; his later life was of a profoundly peripatetic nature.

== Biography ==
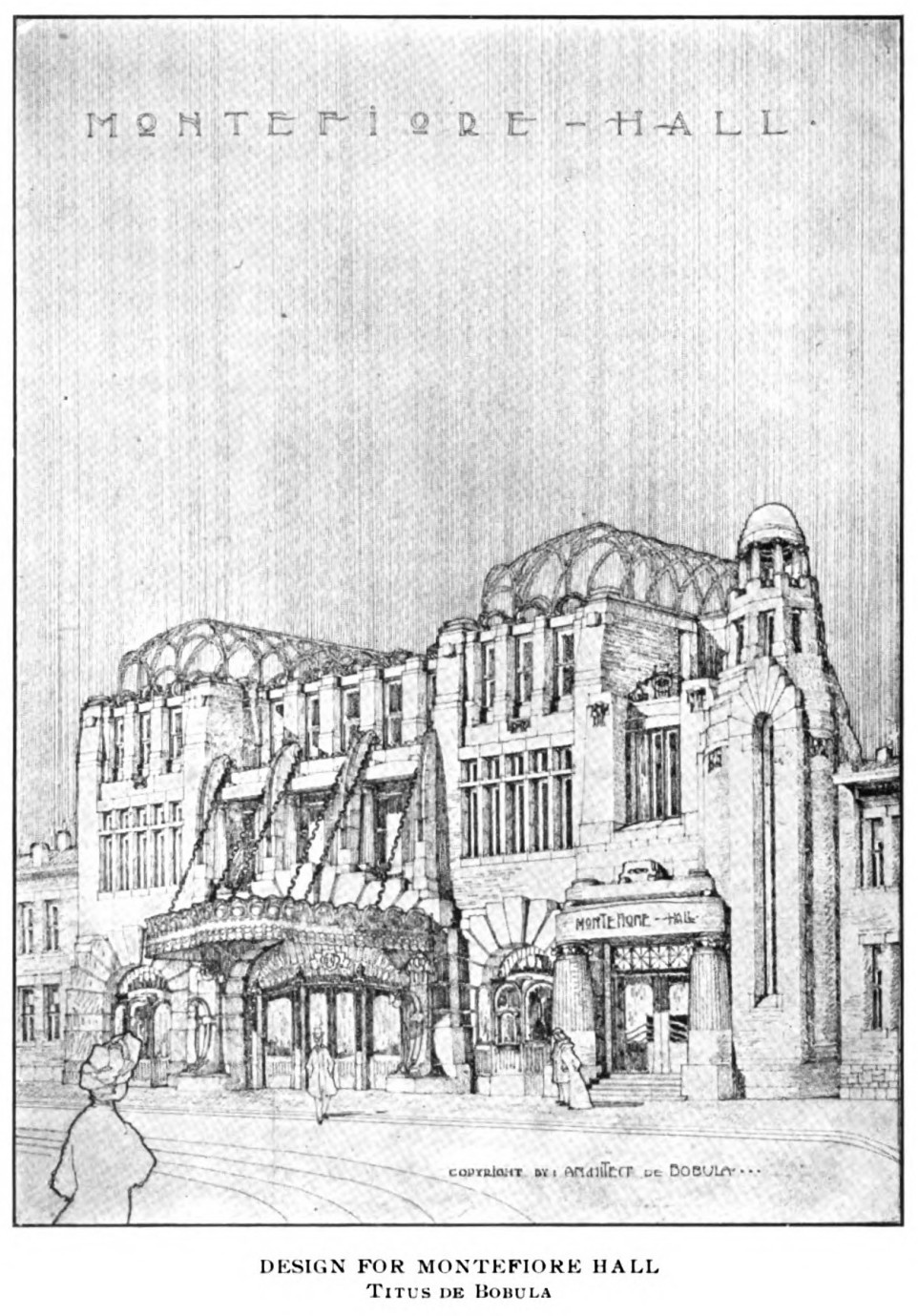
One of the architectural drawings de Bobula exhibited at the Pittsburgh Architectural Club, 1905

=== Early life and architectural career ===
Titusz Bobula was born in Budapest on Christmas Eve 1878 to János Bobula Sr. (1844–1903), an architect and politician of Slovak descent, and his wife, Mária Pozdech. His father, an eminent architect who sat in the Diet of Hungary between 1876 and 1897, afforded the Bobula family a comfortable bourgeois lifestyle; the family lived in the extravagant Bobula Palace from 1883 to 1887. Titusz would follow his father and elder brother, János Bobula Jr. (1871–1922), to the Royal Joseph University, where he studied architecture.

Adding a nobiliary particle to his name, Titus de Bobula emigrated to the United States around 1897. He is thought to have first worked in New York City, but the first mention of him on American soil comes from a 1901 Marietta, Ohio, newspaper notice. In fall 1901, he received a large contract for the construction of a now-demolished business block in Cambridge, Ohio. By 1902, he operated a firm in Zanesville and began designing churches in western Pennsylvania. In 1903, he arrived in Pittsburgh, Pennsylvania, where he established his offices in the Farmers Bank Building. In Pittsburgh, de Bobula was a strident advocate of an "American Style" of architecture and an early proponent of the use of reinforced concrete in dwellings. However, de Bobula's most memorable architectural works were ecclesiastical. In 1903, the year of his arrival in Pittsburgh, he designed St. John the Baptist Greek Catholic Church in Munhall, Pennsylvania, a rare example of American Art Nouveau loosely patterned on the Greek Catholic Cathedral in Uzhhorod. De Bobula's ecclesiastical work shows strong influence from Art Nouveau works in Budapest and Viennese modernism, quoting Otto Wagner "liberally". De Bobula is believed to have also built commercial and apartment buildings, though documentation is scarce. He was tried for manslaughter after fatally running over a woman with an automobile in Duquesne, but was later acquitted, in 1904. In 1905, he put on an exhibition of his secessionist architectural drawings at the Pittsburgh Architectural Club, which was met with some skepticism by the club's president, John T. Comes.

=== After Pittsburgh ===
In 1910, now identified as the general superintendent of Gates Coal and Coke Company, he married Eurana Dinkey Mock of Bethlehem, Pennsylvania, a niece of Charles M. Schwab's wife, Emma Eurana Dinkey. The couple moved to New York City, where they resided in an eclectic (now-demolished) Spuyten Duyvil mansion designed by de Bobula. De Bobula successfully extracted large sums of money from his wife's uncle (who called de Bobula "dishonest, incompetent and a blackmailer"), unsuccessfully suing Schwab for slander in 1919.

==== Coup plot ====
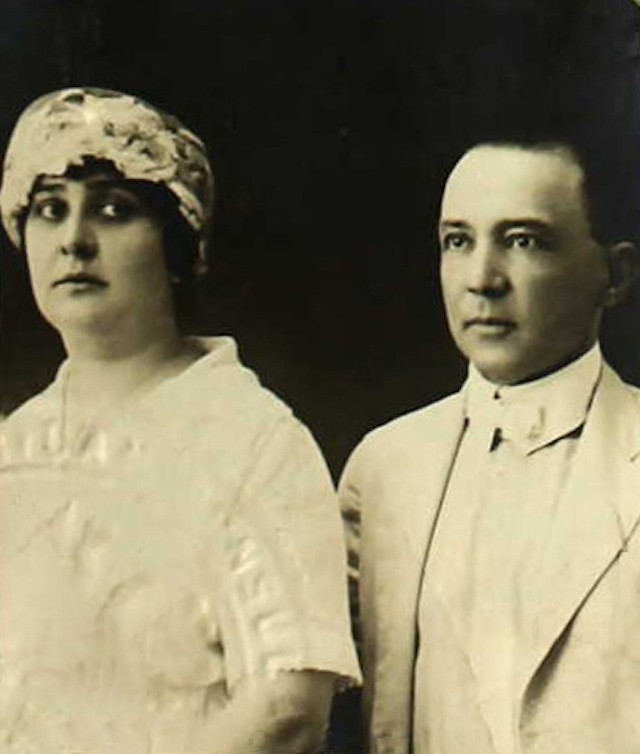
The newlywed de Bobula couple

De Bobula and his wife moved to Hungary in the early 1920s, and he made successful investments which allowed him to turn to patronage of then-marginal far-right forces opposed to the Bethlen government. He edited an anti-Semitic newspaper, Amerika, and adopted a fascist political stance. On Nov. 7, 1923, he was arrested after a coup plot, apparently meant to be synchronized with the Beer Hall Putsch, was uncovered with de Bobula and two other Hungarian right-wing activists, Deputy Ferenc Ulain and Dr. Béla Szemere, at its center. The coup's putative goals were the restoration of Hungary's pre-Trianon borders, the overthrow of the Bethlen government in favor of one led by Gyula Gömbös, and the extermination of Hungarian Jewry. However, the plot was somewhat farcical in comparison with its German sibling, not in the least because the alleged envoy of Hitler who egged on the plot was an agent provocateur who revealed it to the government before it could be executed. Due to the trivial nature of the plot, de Bobula was promptly released from jail and left Hungary with Eurana. Rumors that de Bobula was an agent of Henry Ford swirled after the plot's revelation. Ford, however, personally denied the charges.

==== Later life ====
By 1934, de Bobula had started a new career as an arms dealer and designer, filing a patent for a grenade in 1934. He and Eurana still resided in Spuyten Duyvil, albeit in reduced circumstances, no longer in the home he designed. In 1935, he was mentioned as a New York-based submachine gun importer ("Colonel de Bobula") in testimony to a Special Committee of the Senate regarding the munitions industry. He unsuccessfully filed objections to Emma Dinkey's will upon the latter's death in 1939, claiming that his wife was entitled to part of her estate. Nikola Tesla biographer Marc Seifer claims that de Bobula did architectural work for Tesla in the 1930s.

De Bobula moved to Washington, D.C., after 1939, continuing to involve himself with the estate of his wife's aunt. He and his wife were evicted from their Northwest residence in 1944. In the early 1950s, he became involved in a real-estate dispute with an employee of the CIA; agency documents pertaining to the matter labeled him a "litigious crank". In letters de Bobula wrote to Allen Dulles in the wake of the dispute, he claimed that he and his wife lived in poverty in Takoma Park, with his letterhead still identifying him as an architect.

De Bobula died in 1961. His Washington Post obituary described him as a retired consulting architect best known for designing churches in Ohio and Pennsylvania. He and his wife are buried in Bethlehem, Pennsylvania.

== Known buildings ==
- 1903 – St. John the Baptist Greek Catholic Church and Rectory, Munhall, Pennsylvania
- 1903 – Glen Tenement, Hazelwood, Pennsylvania
- c. 1903 – c. 1906 – 418 First Avenue, Pittsburgh, Pennsylvania
- 1904 – First Hungarian Reformed Church, Hazelwood, Pennsylvania
- 1904 – St. Emory’s Hungarian Catholic Church (now Faith Bible Church), Connellsville, Pennsylvania
- 1904 – St. Michael's School and parish house, Braddock, Pennsylvania
- 1905 – Concrete row houses, Greenfield, Pennsylvania (some demolished)
- 1906 – Sts. Peter & Paul Greek Catholic (now Ukrainian Orthodox) Church, Carnegie, Pennsylvania
- 1907 – Apartment building (Everett Apartments), Shadyside, Pennsylvania
- 1907 – Holy Cross Catholic Church, Glassport, Pennsylvania (heavily modified)
- 1908 – St. Michael's Catholic School, Braddock, Pennsylvania
- c. 1920 – House at Spuyten Duyvil (2521 Palisade Avenue), Bronx, New York (demolished)

== Gallery ==
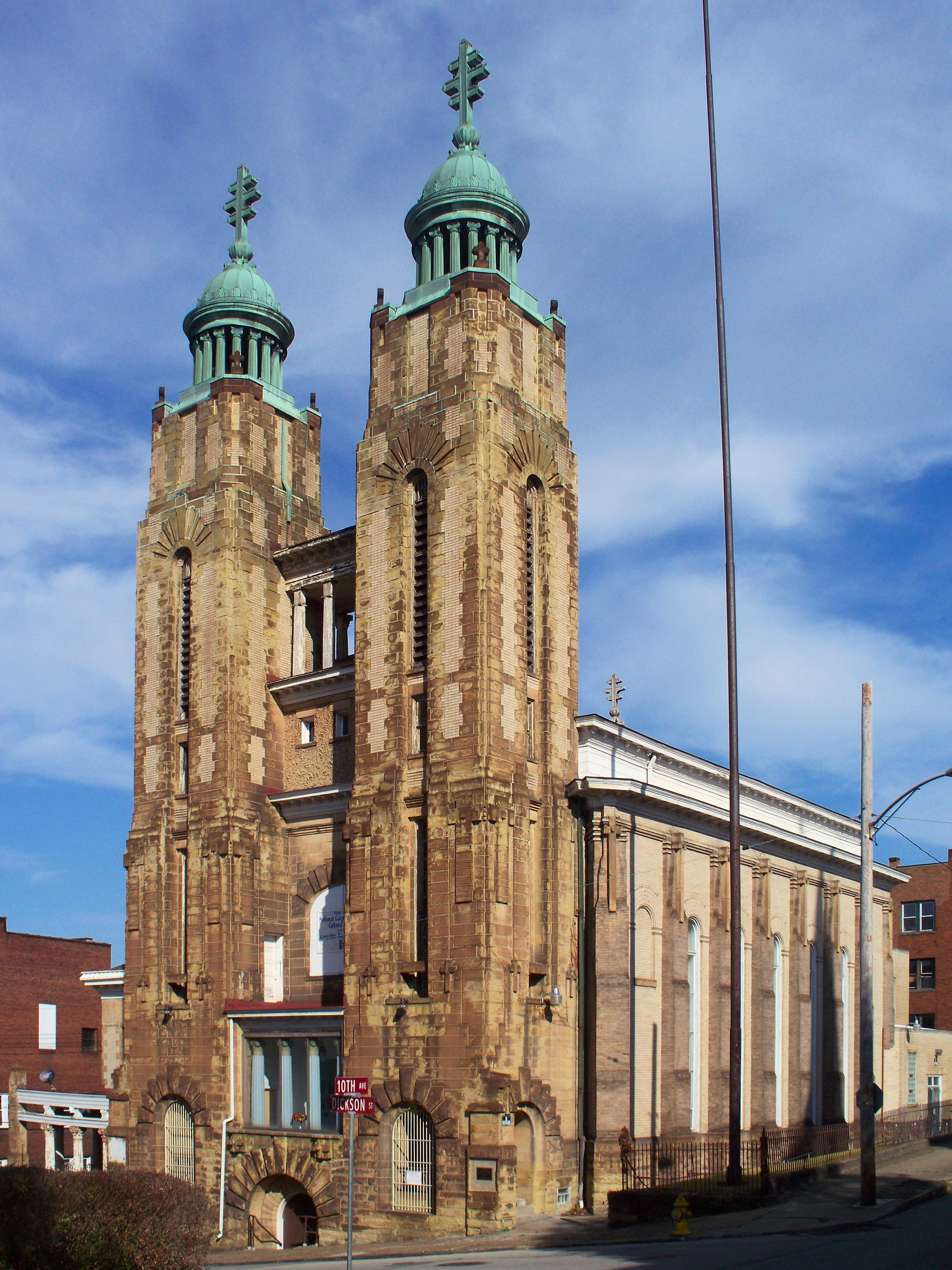
St. John the Baptist Greek Catholic Church, now Headquarters of the Carpatho-Rusyn Society, Munhall (1903)

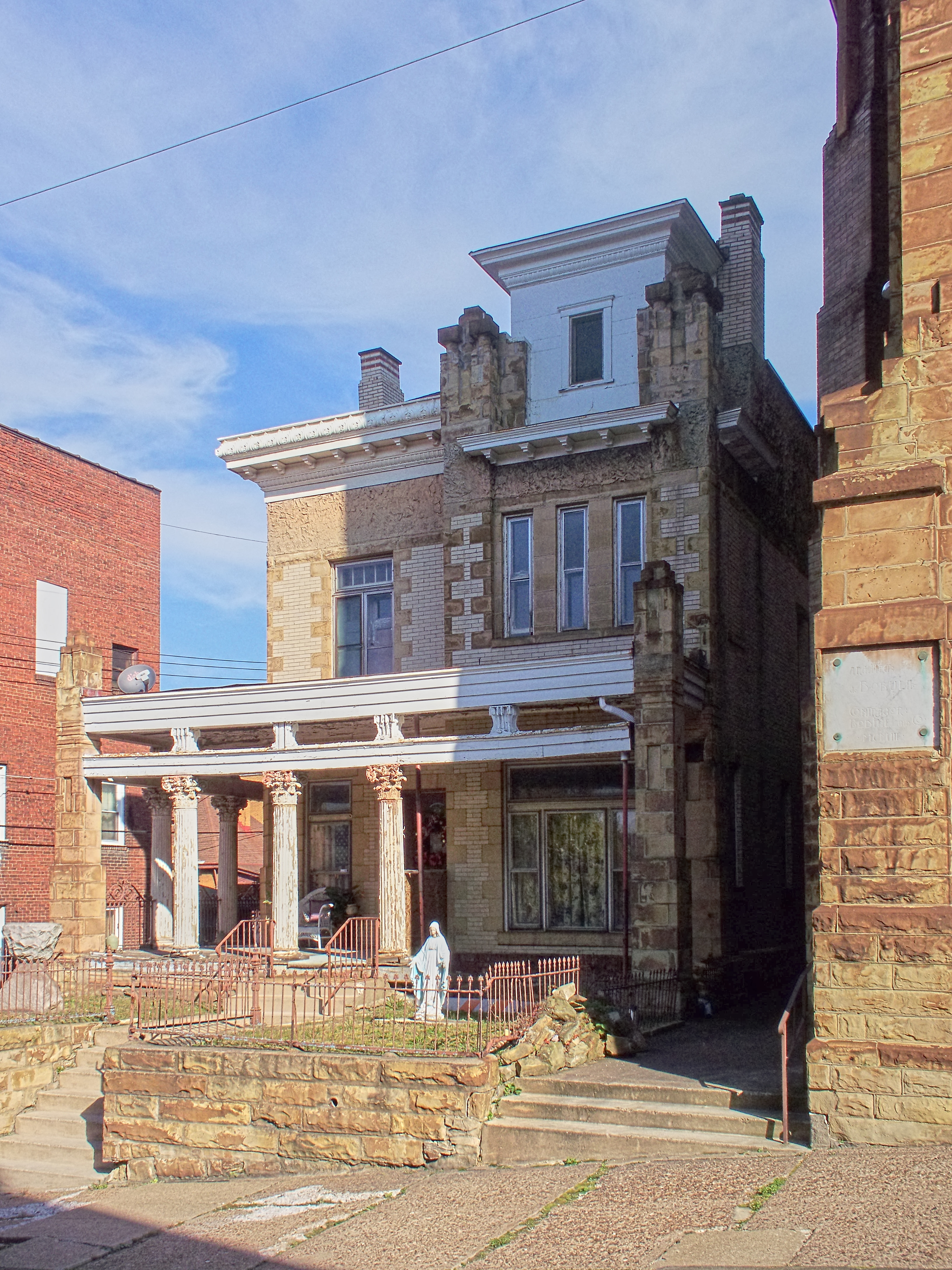
Rectory at St. John the Baptist Greek Catholic Church, Munhall (1903)

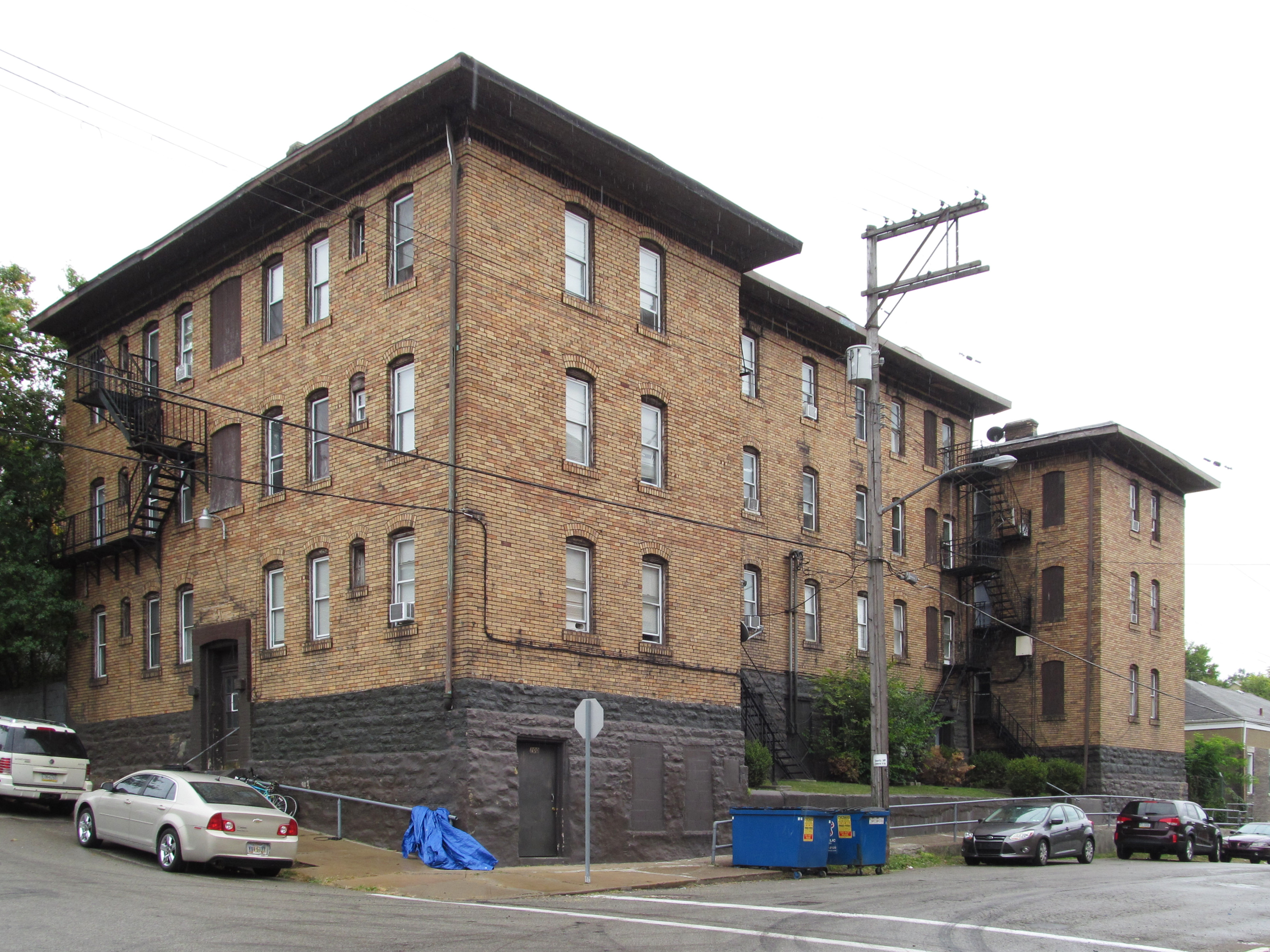
Glen Tenement, Hazelwood (1903)

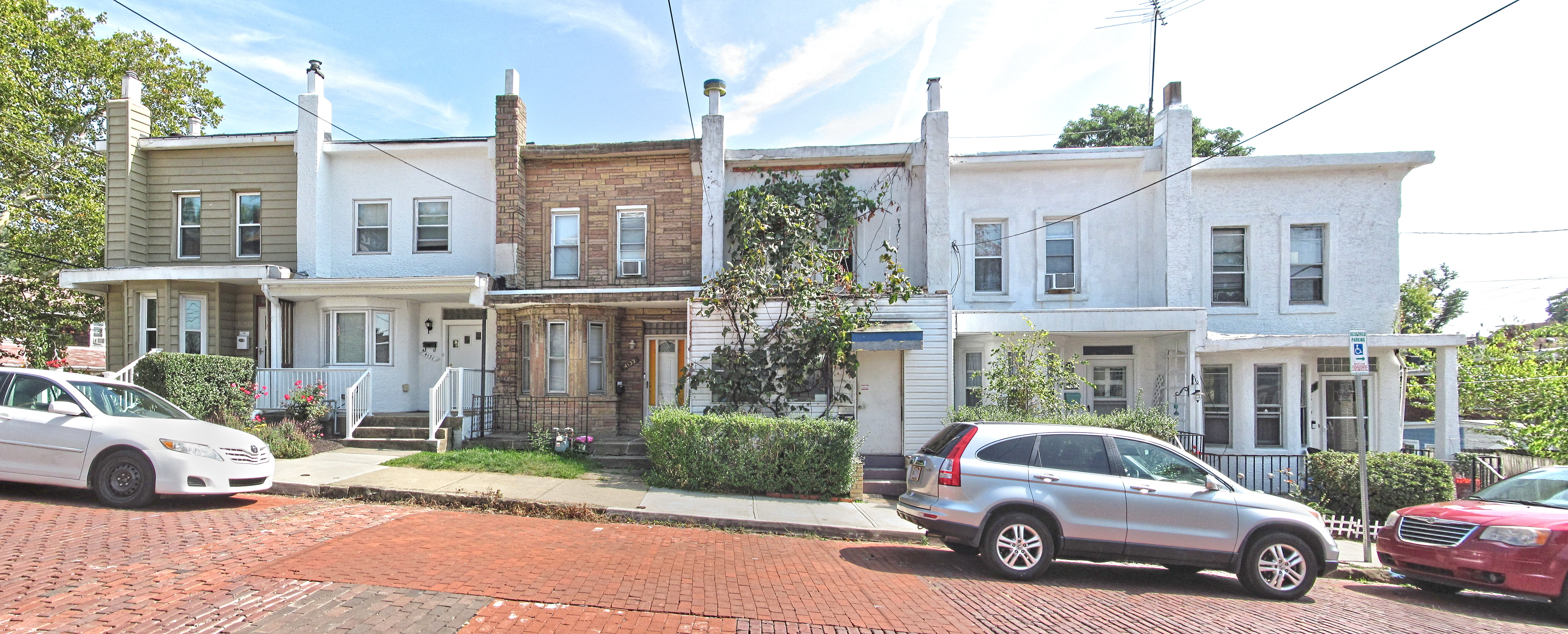
Concrete row houses, Greenfield (1905)

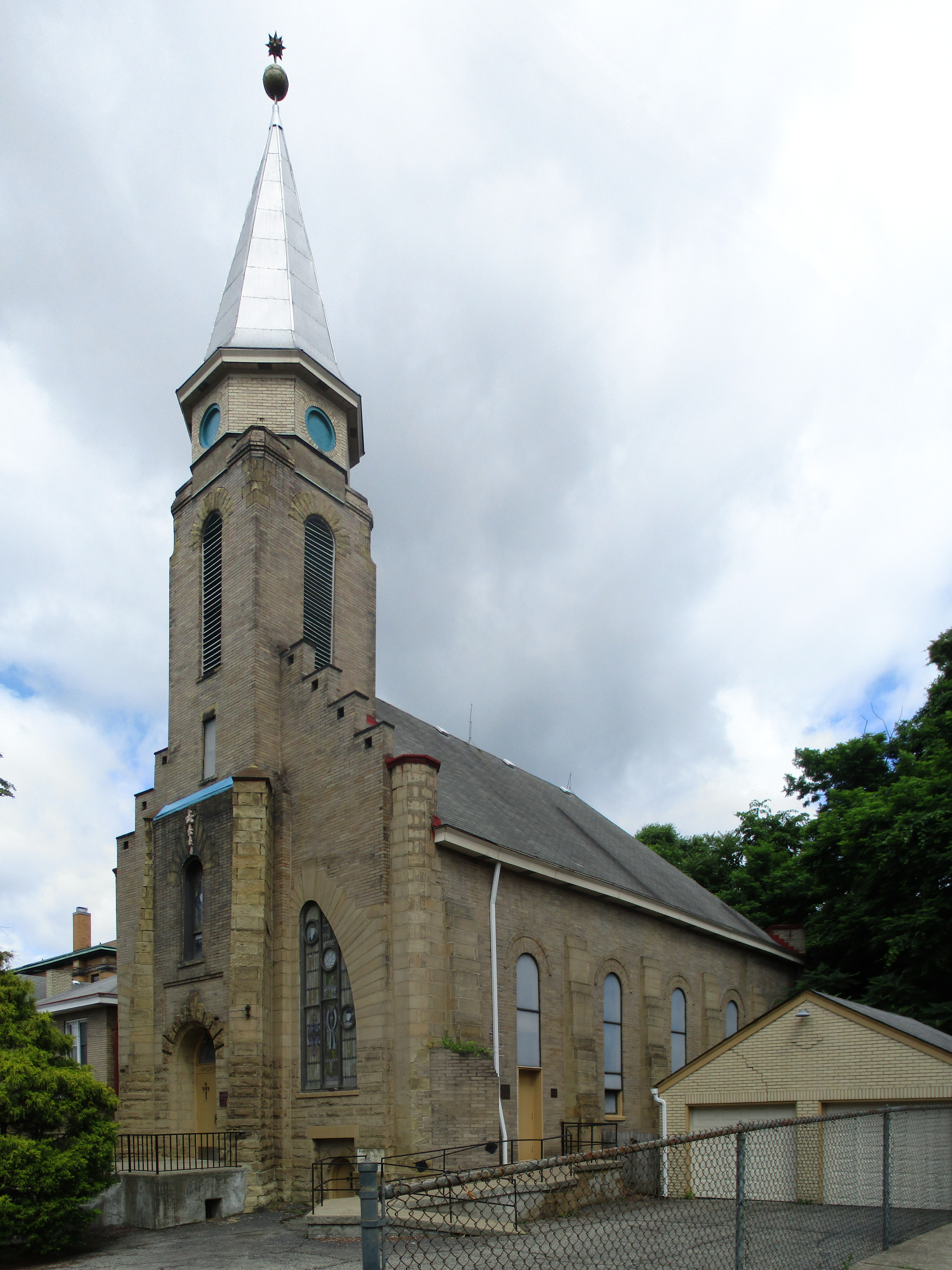
First Hungarian Reformed Church, Hazelwood (1904)

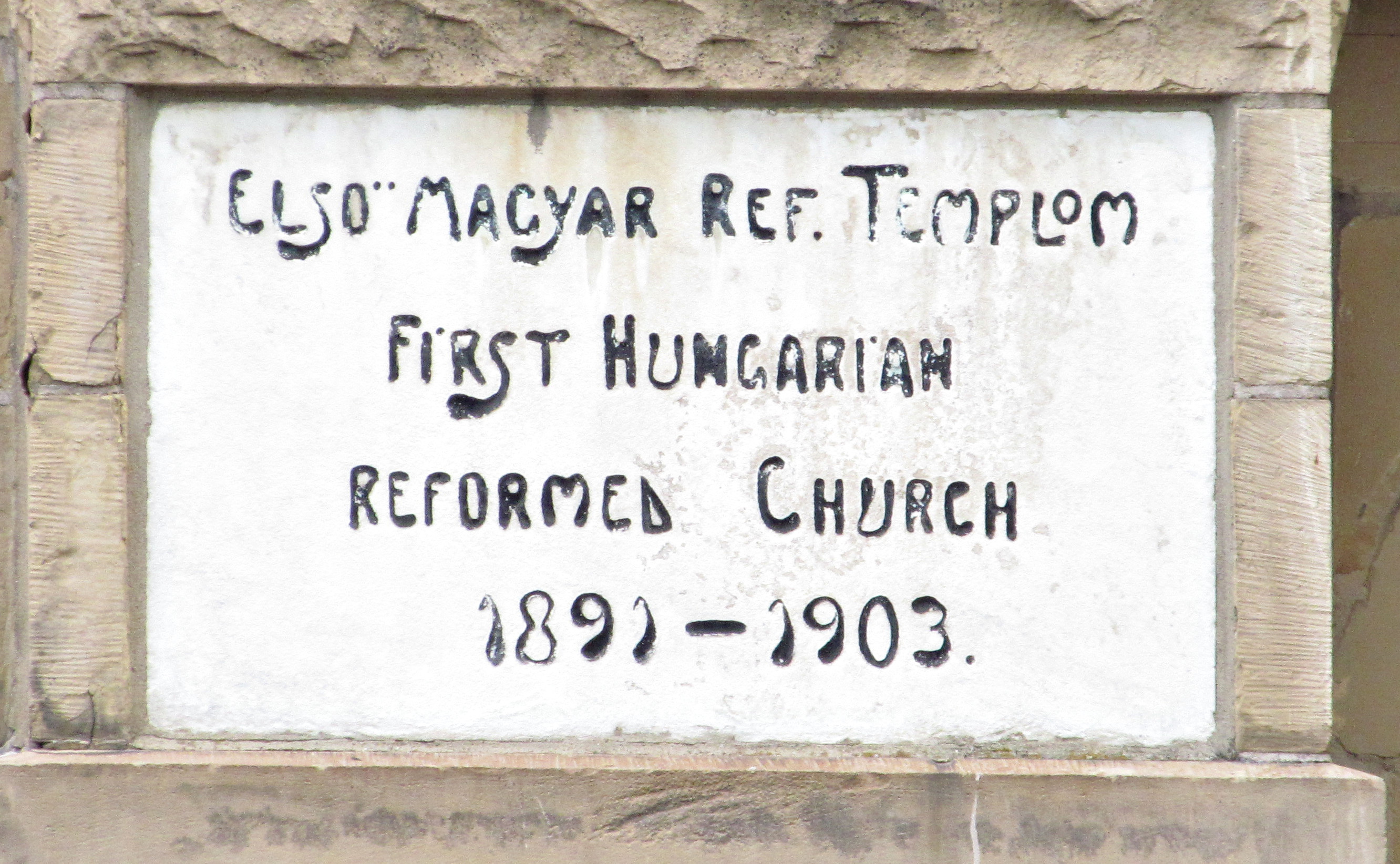
Art Nouveau dedicatory inscription at the Hungarian Reformed Church

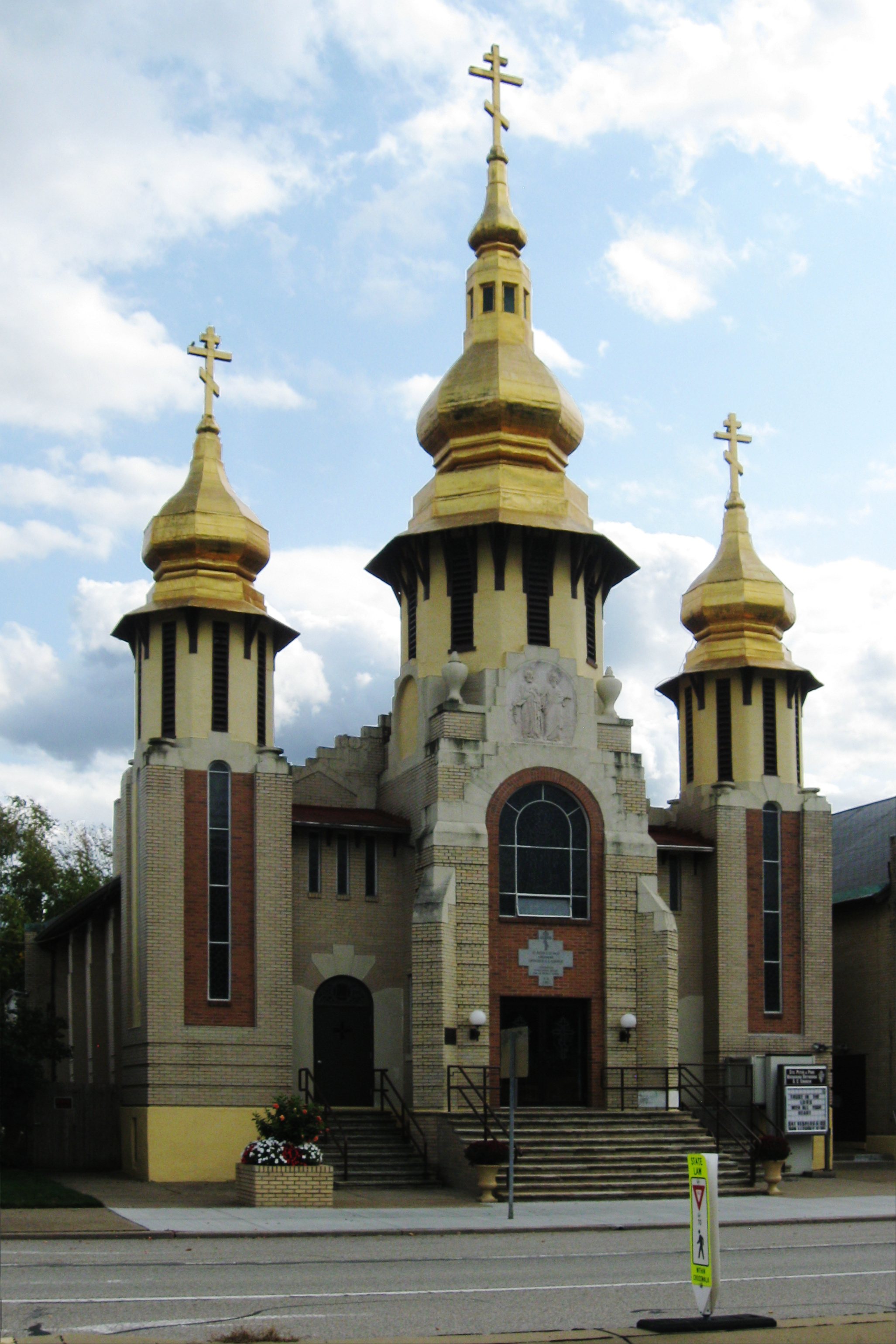
Sts. Peter and Paul Greek Catholic Church, Carnegie (1906)

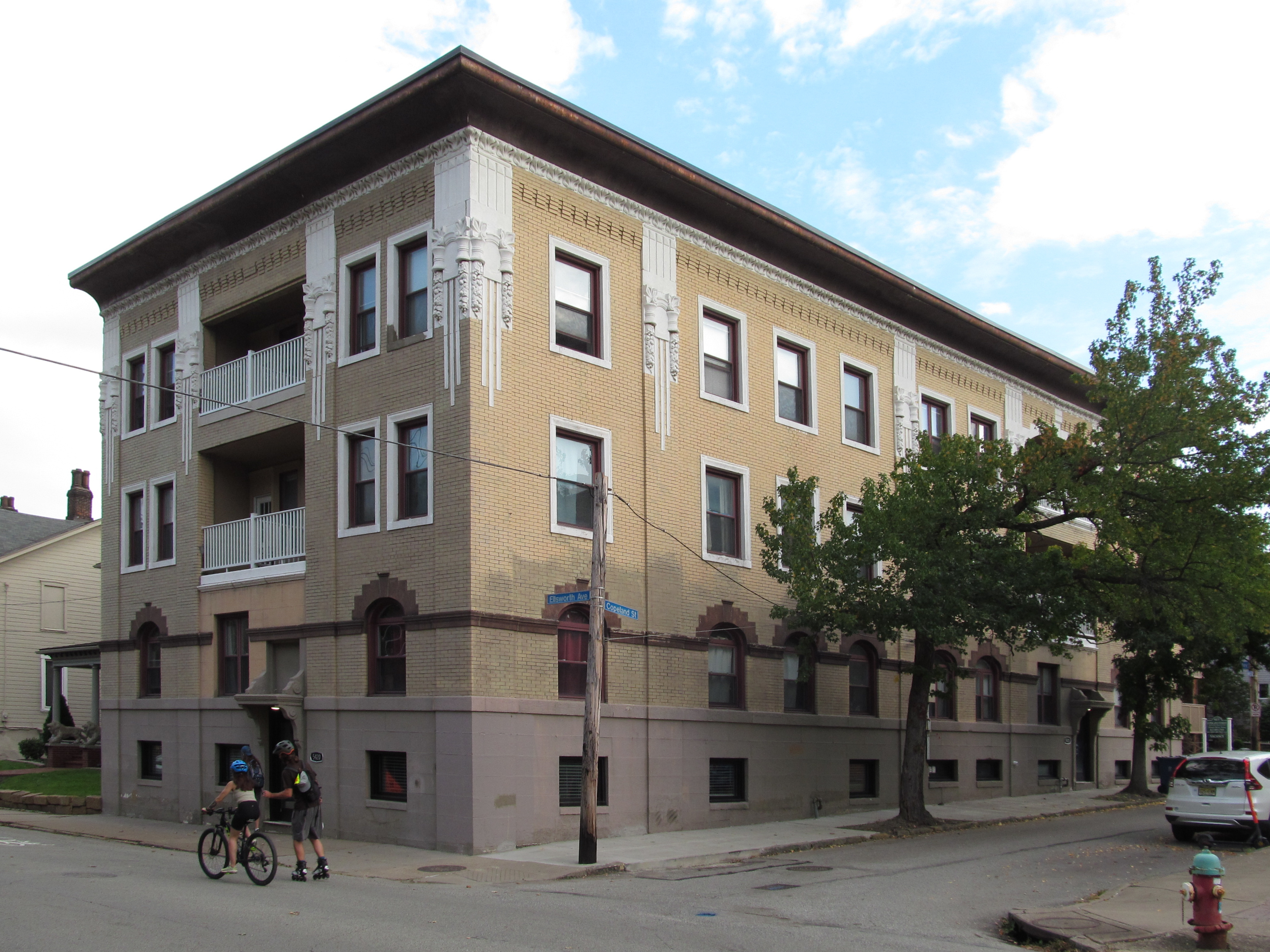
"Everett Apartments", Shadyside (1907)

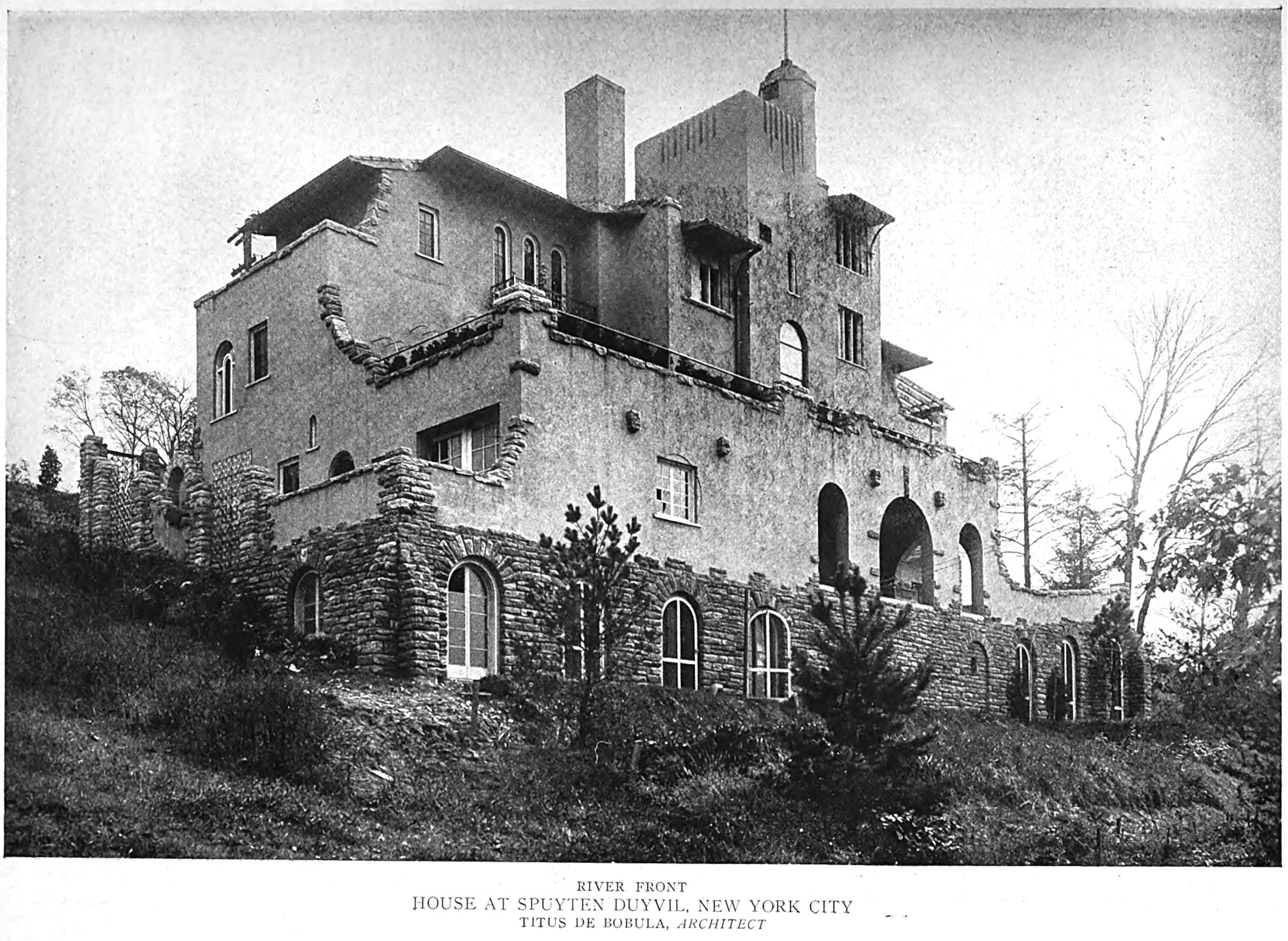
House at Spuyten Duyvil, now demolished (c. 1920)
