= Pittsburgh Folk Festival =

Cultural festival in Pittsburgh, Pennsylvania

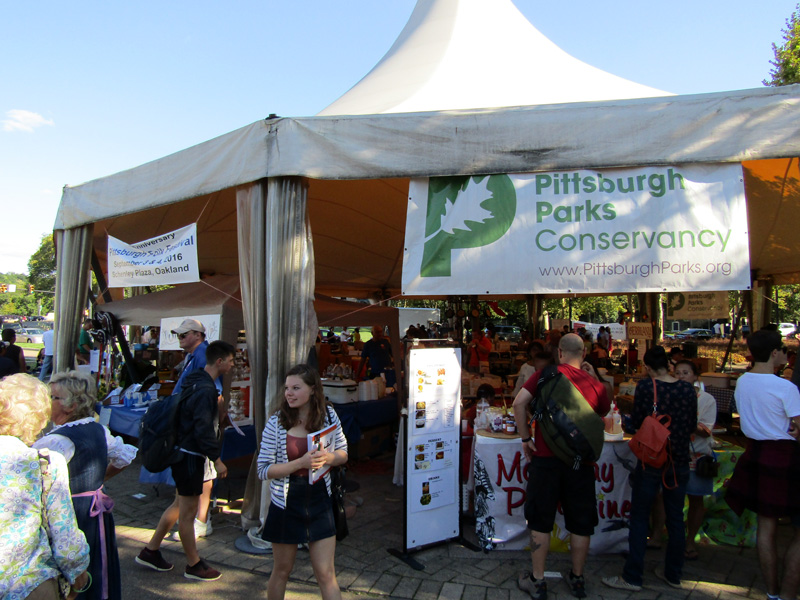
- Pittsburgh Folk Festival in Schenley Plaza, Pittsburgh, Pennsylvania, on September 3, 2016
- Genre: multicultural, various international ethnic heritages represented in song, dance, and cuisine, as well as arts and crafts
- Dates: first weekend of September (Labor Day weekend)
- Frequency: Annually
- Locations: Pittsburgh, Pennsylvania, USA
- Years active: 1956–2019, 2021–
- Inaugurated: 1956
- Website: Official website

The Pittsburgh Folk Festival is a large multicultural celebration of diverse international ethnic heritages, which has been held in Pittsburgh, Pennsylvania since 1956.

The festival's early mission statement was described in May 1959, as follows, by The Zajednicar, the official newspaper of the Croatian Fraternal Union of America:

"Being under the auspices of the Duquesne University, the Festival is a non-profit venture dedicated to a closer relationship of the present day citizenry and a better appreciation of their contribution to Pittsburgh growth, especially on the occasion of the bi-centennial year."

== History ==
Initially sponsored by Duquesne University, this festival has been held annually since 1956. Various cultures have been represented, since that time through music, folk dance, and performances on the main stage while vendors sell traditional food as well as arts and crafts during the festival.

=== 1950s ===
In 1956, the first festival was held at the Syria Mosque, beginning at 5 p.m. each day on Saturday and Sunday, June 9 and 10. Food booths were located on the mosque's ground floor with multicultural exhibits of history, crafts and products displayed in the mosque's upstairs lobby. On Saturday, the two-hour program, which began at 8 p.m., featured dances, folk singers and storytellers from Scottish, Hungarian, Bulgarian, American, Croatian, Russian, Slovak, Greek, ad German traditions while the Sunday program featured Italian, Lithuanian, Lebanese, Carpatho-Russian, Polish, Irish, Israeli, Chinese, and Ukrainian cultural performances.

The theme of the third annual festival, which was also held at the Syria Mosque, was "Unity in Diversity: Democracy and Beauty; Fun and Friendliness!" It was held from Friday, May 9 through Sunday, May 11, 1958.

Held again at the Syria Mosque in 1959, the fourth annual event began at 5 p.m. each night from Friday May 15 through Sunday, May 17. Friday evening's performances represented Swiss, Indian, Italian, Lithuanian, Scottish, and Hungarian traditions while Slovak, German, Croatian, Chinese, Ukrainian, and Greek groups performed on Saturday, and Bulgarian, Irish, Mexican, Lebanese, Carpatho-Russian, and Polish groups closed out the festival on Sunday. General admission tickets were $1.50 per person. More than 3,000 people attended that year's opening day events.

=== 1960s ===
In 1962, Robert Morris Junior College took over sponsorship of the festival.

The tenth annual festival included "a French show and French booths" for the first time. The event was held again at the Syria Mosque in May of 1966.

By 1967, the festival had grown so large that it was moved to Pittsburgh’s Civic Arena.

=== 1970 ===
In 1976, which was both the twentieth anniversary of the Pittsburgh Folk Festival and the year in which the United States Bicentennial was celebrated, newspapers across the country reported that Pittsburgh's annual multicultural event had become one of its nation's largest outdoor festivals. Festival operators received $22,000 in state funds via the Allegheny County Bicentennial Commission that year to add two days to the event's schedule and provide free admission to students and senior citizens.

More than thirty thousand people were expected to attend the festival in 1977.

=== 1980s ===
In 1985, festival planners introduced several new features, including an International Bazaar, where attendees could purchase "authentic ethnic artifacts," and a new family ticket plan that allowed parents to purchase admission for two adults and two children for nine dollars, for a savings of six dollars off the standard general price of admission. That year, attendance figures declined sixteen percent, from the 38,000 visitors it had attracted in 1984 to 32,000. Planners faulted a decision by Pittsburgh city officials to allow the scheduling of a free carnival event for children on the same day of the 1985 festival at Three Rivers Stadium.

For the festival's thirtieth anniversary in 1986, longtime festival organizers Charles and Carol Cubelic programmed the event to highlight the histories and cultures of India, Korea and Poland, with India's extensive programming timed to coincide with the Festival of India Exhibition that was touring the United States at the time, after having opened at the Smithsonian Institution in Washington, D.C.

Carol Cubelic took over as director of the festival in October 1989 when her husband's health declined sharply. He died from cancer shortly afterward on October 29, 1989. The 1989 Pittsburgh Folk Festival, the final event overseen by Charles Cubelic, was one of the most successful in the festival's history, attracting more than forty thousand attendees during its three-day run.

=== 1990s ===
The thirty-fourth annual Pittsburgh Folk Festival, the first under the leadership of Carole Cubelic, was held from May 25 to 27, 1989. "I came to Pittsburgh in 1992. And when I married my late husband, I married this festival," she said when interviewed by The Pittsburgh Press the day before the festival's Memorial Day weekend opening. The theme of that year's festival was "A Taste of the Old World." Live cooking demonstrations were sponsored by Equitable Gas.

In 1992, Robert Morris College ended its sponsorship of the festival, citing that it had lost twenty to thirty thousand dollars over the thirty-year period that it had sponsored the event. As a result, Carole Cubelic, who had been employed by the college as a student accounts administrator while also serving as assistant director and then director of the Pittsburgh Folk Festival, stepped down from her role as festival director. The college subsequently transferred the Pittsburgh Folk Festival Corporation to the nineteen groups that had collectively provided the cultural performances, food and volunteer staffing for the festival for nearly forty years. Additionally, negotiations with the David L. Lawrence Convention Center, which had been the festival's venue for many years, turned difficult when center managers began pushing festival planners to "expand the event into an ethnic food fair," which event planners feared would ruin the festival's food reputation with increased participation of inauthentic, carnival-style pizza and Italian sausage stands. Convention center executives also planned to double or triple charges for booth rentals and utility use while proposing that the $6 general admission fee be cut in half, which would have eliminated a source of revenue for the multicultural groups hoping to participate in the event. In response, the festival's new organizers moved the 36th annual event from the convention center to the Melody Tent and Amphitheater at Station Square, which was operated by the Pittsburgh History & Landmarks Foundation. Held again on Memorial Day weekend, event planners hoped to attract a crowd of forty to fifty thousand attendees.

Festival leadership changed again the following year with Nan Krushinski taking the helm as festival administrator on behalf of Pittsburgh Folk Festival Inc., the business organization formed by the multiple cultural organizations that had been involved in presenting the festival over the years. Still scheduled on Memorial Day weekend, the 37th annual event was held, for the first time in its history, at a venue outside of Pittsburgh city limits. Opening at the Pittsburgh Expo Mart in Monroeville on Friday, May 28, 1993, the festival launched a new entertainment plan with three stages changing various presenters every thirty minutes as the stages operated continuously throughout each festival day. Ticket prices were set at five dollars for adults (four dollars for senior citizens), and three dollars for children aged three to twelve.

By the time of its fortieth anniversary in 1996, the Pittsburgh Folk Festival had returned to the David L. Lawrence Convention Center in the city's downtown. The festival's head that year was Angela Lipchick.

=== Fiftieth anniversary (2006) ===
Still held at the David L. Lawrence Convention Center in downtown Pittsburgh in 2006, the Pittsburgh Folk Festival celebrated its fiftieth anniversary by inviting the participation of twenty-five ethnic groups, five of which (Bulgaria, Greece, Lebanon, Lithuania, and Ukraine) had been represented every year since the festival's founding in 1956. The Rev. James Root chaired that year's event. Walter Kolar, a member of the festival since its founding, developed a fiftieth-anniversary display.

=== Present day ===
In 2016, festival organizers celebrated the sixtieth anniversary of the Pittsburgh Folk Festival in conjunction with the city of Pittsburgh's bicentennial celebrations. It was held over Labor Day weekend, from September 3 to 4, in the Schenley Plaza Tent in Oakland. More than forty distinct cultures from twenty countries were celebrated with Bhutan, Egypt, Mexico, and Venezuela represented for the first time. Admission was free.

There was no festival in 2020. Resumption of the festival happened a year later.

== Gallery ==
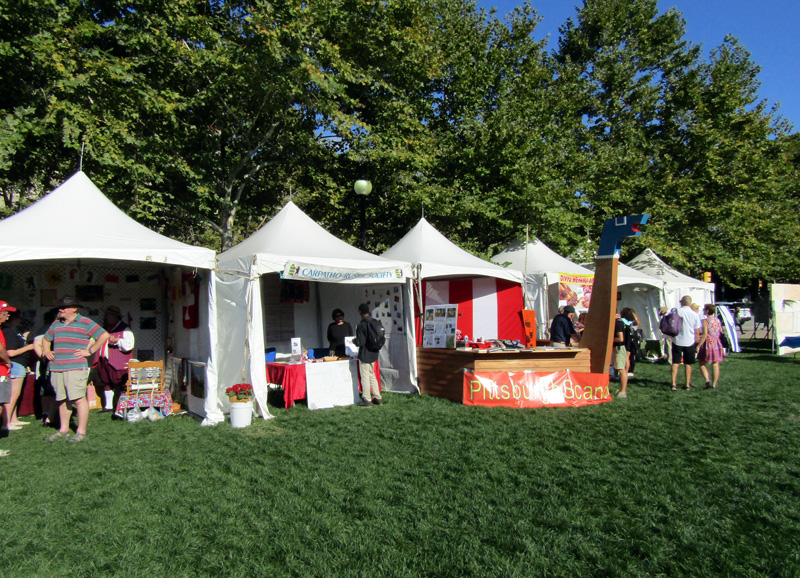
Some booths at the Pittsburgh Folk Festival in Schenley Plaza on September 3, 2016

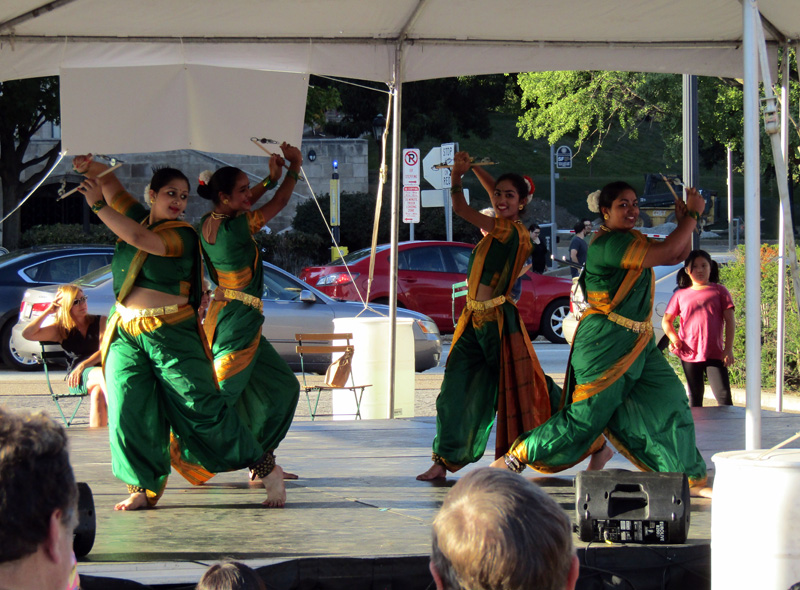
Dancers performing Indian dances at the Pittsburgh Folk Festival, September 3, 2016

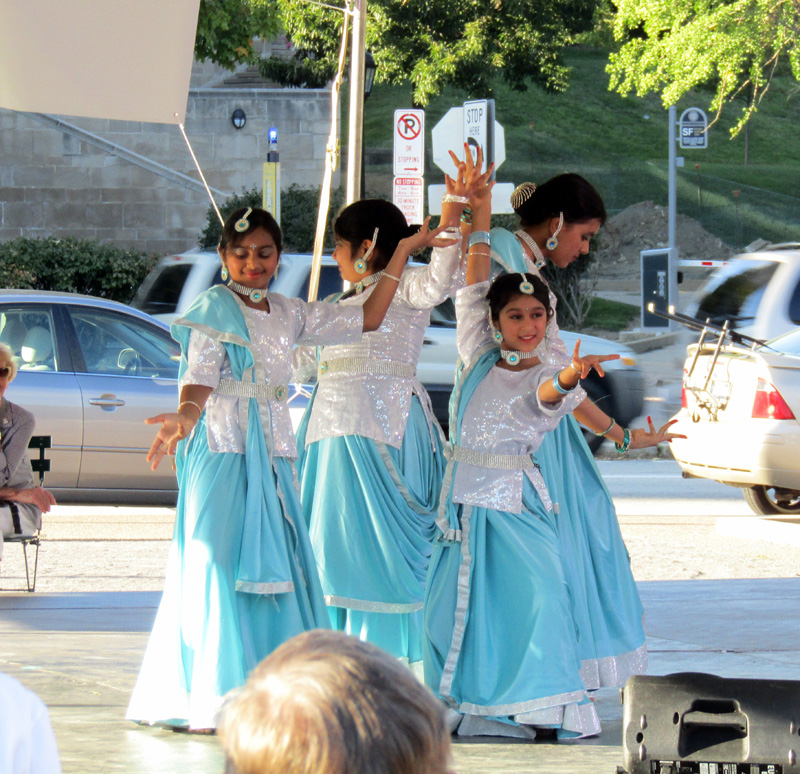
Dancers performing Indian dances at the Pittsburgh Folk Festival, September 3, 2016
