= Gregory Žatkovich =

American lawyer

Gregory Zhatkovich
- Ґриґорій Жаткович
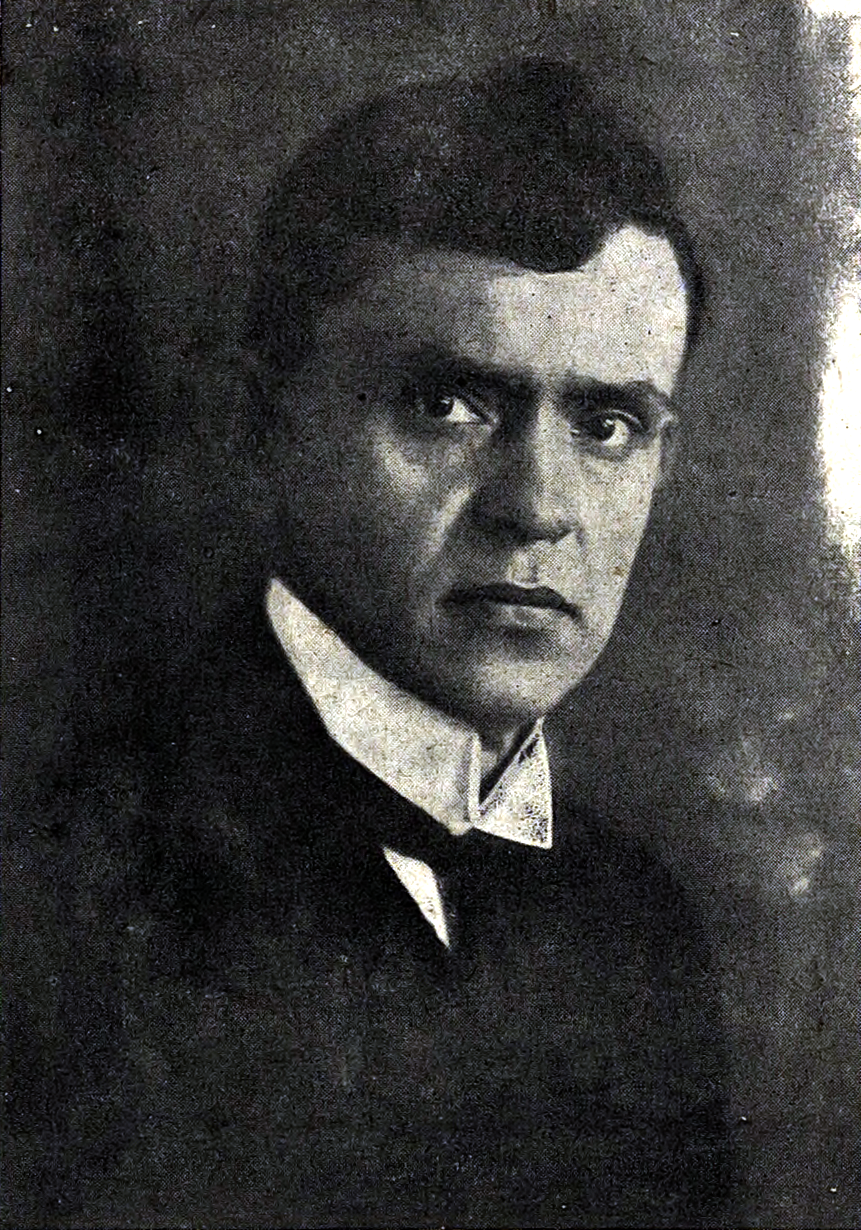
- Gregory Zhatkovich, 1920

Land Governor of Subcarpathian Ruthenia
- In office 26 April 1920 – March 1921
- President: Tomáš Masaryk
- Preceded by: post created
- Succeeded by: Peter Erenfeld

Personal details
- Born: December 2, 1886 Galambos, Austria-Hungary (now Holubyne, Ukraine)
- Died: March 26, 1967 (aged 80) Pittsburgh, Pennsylvania, USA
- Resting place: Calvary Cemetery, Pittsburgh, Pennsylvania
- Parent: Paul Zhatkovich
- Education: University of Pennsylvania
- Occupation: lawyer
- Known for: Rusyn political activist

Gregory Ignatius Zhatkovich (Note: Rusyn: Ґриґорій Іґнатій Жаткович, romanized: Grygory Ignaty Zhatkovych) (December 2, 1886 – March 26, 1967) was an American lawyer and political activist for Rusyns in the United States and Europe.

He was the first governor of Carpathian Ruthenia, the Rusyn autonomous province of Czechoslovakia and the only American who was a governor of any territory that was or became part of the Soviet Union.

== Early life and career ==
He was born in Galambos, Bereg County, Austria-Hungary (now Holubyne, Svaliava Raion, Zakarpattia Oblast, Ukraine) and emigrated to Pennsylvania with his parents at age five.

His father, Paul Zhatkovich, was the founding editor of the leading Rusyn-American newspaper, Amerikansky Russky Viestnik.

Zhatkovich graduated from high school in Pittsburgh, earned his undergraduate degree from the University of Pennsylvania in 1907, and his LL.D. from the law school at Penn in 1910.

== Involvement in Rusyn Affairs 1918–1921 ==
Following his father's involvement in Rusyn affairs, Zhatkovich was drawn in 1918 into the role of a spokesman for the American National Council of Uhro-Rusyns, at the time when the dissolution of Austria-Hungary placed their future – as that of many other peoples – on the international diplomatic agenda.

In July 1918, Rusyn-Americans convened and called for complete independence of Carpathian Ruthenia. Failing that, they would try to unite with Galicia and Bukovina; and failing that, they would demand autonomy, though they did not specify under which state.

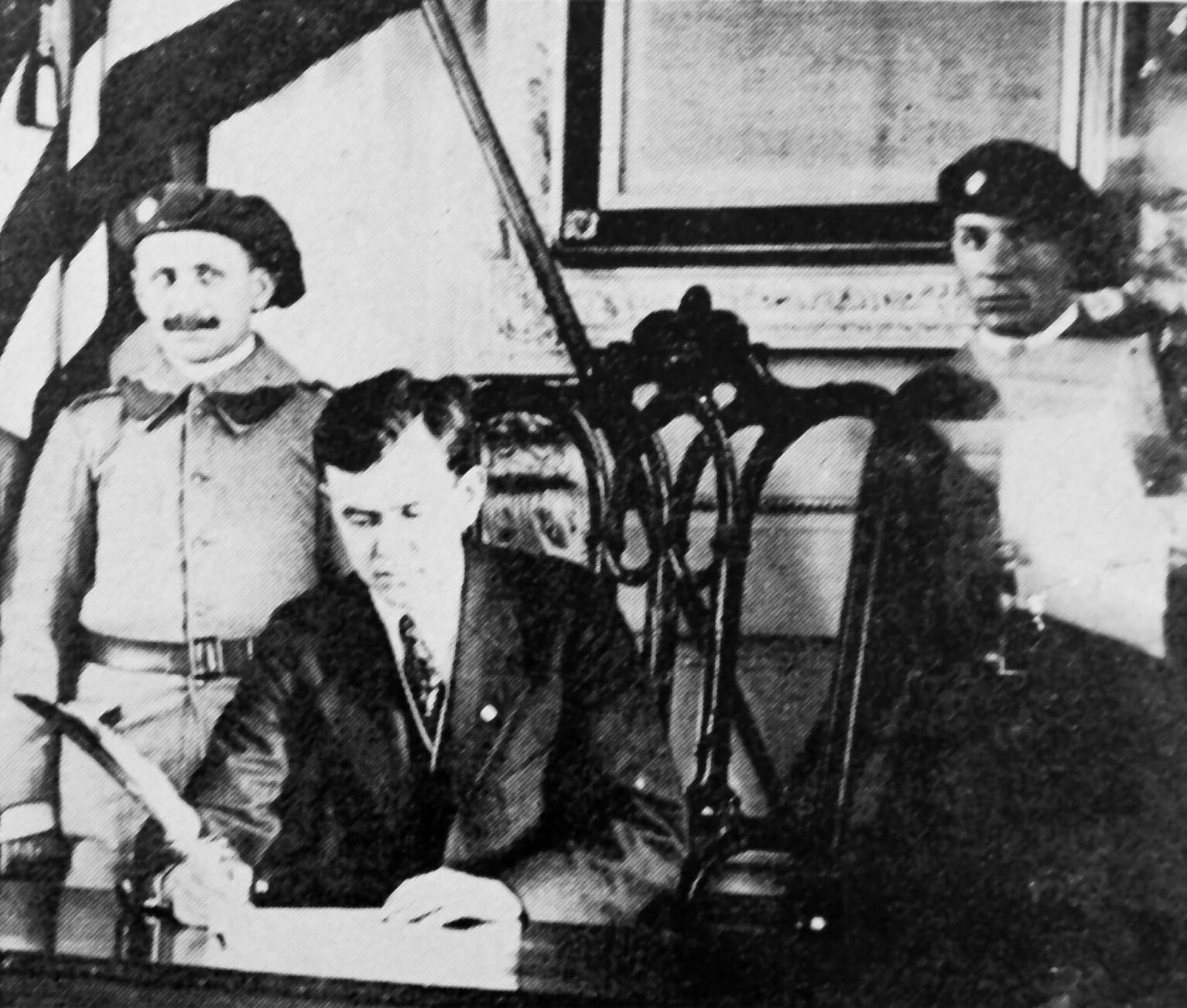
Gregory Žatkovich signing the Declaration of Common Aims at Independence Hall, Phila. PA 10-26-1918.

Members of President Woodrow Wilson's administration told Zatkovich and other Rusyn-Americans that "the only viable option was unification with the new state of Czechoslovakia". Zatkovich accepted that the best he could do was work for creating a place for Rusyns in Czechoslovakia, and signed the "Philadelphia Agreement" with Czechoslovak President Tomáš Masaryk, guaranteeing Rusyn autonomy upon unification with Czechoslovakia.

A referendum was held among American Rusyn parishes, with a resulting 67% in favor. In May 1919, a Central National Council convened under Zatkovich and voted unanimously to accept the Czechoslovak solution. An assembly held in the territory itself on May 8, 1919 "Endorsed the decision of the American Uhro-Rusin Council to unite with the Czech-Slovak nation on the basis of full national autonomy."

Zatkovich was appointed governor of the province by Masaryk on April 20, 1920. He resigned, however, less than a year later, on April 17, 1921, to return to his law practice in Pittsburgh, Pennsylvania. President Wilson and the U.S. Department of State helped Zhatkovich retain his U.S. citizenship while he served as governor of Carpathian Ruthenia.

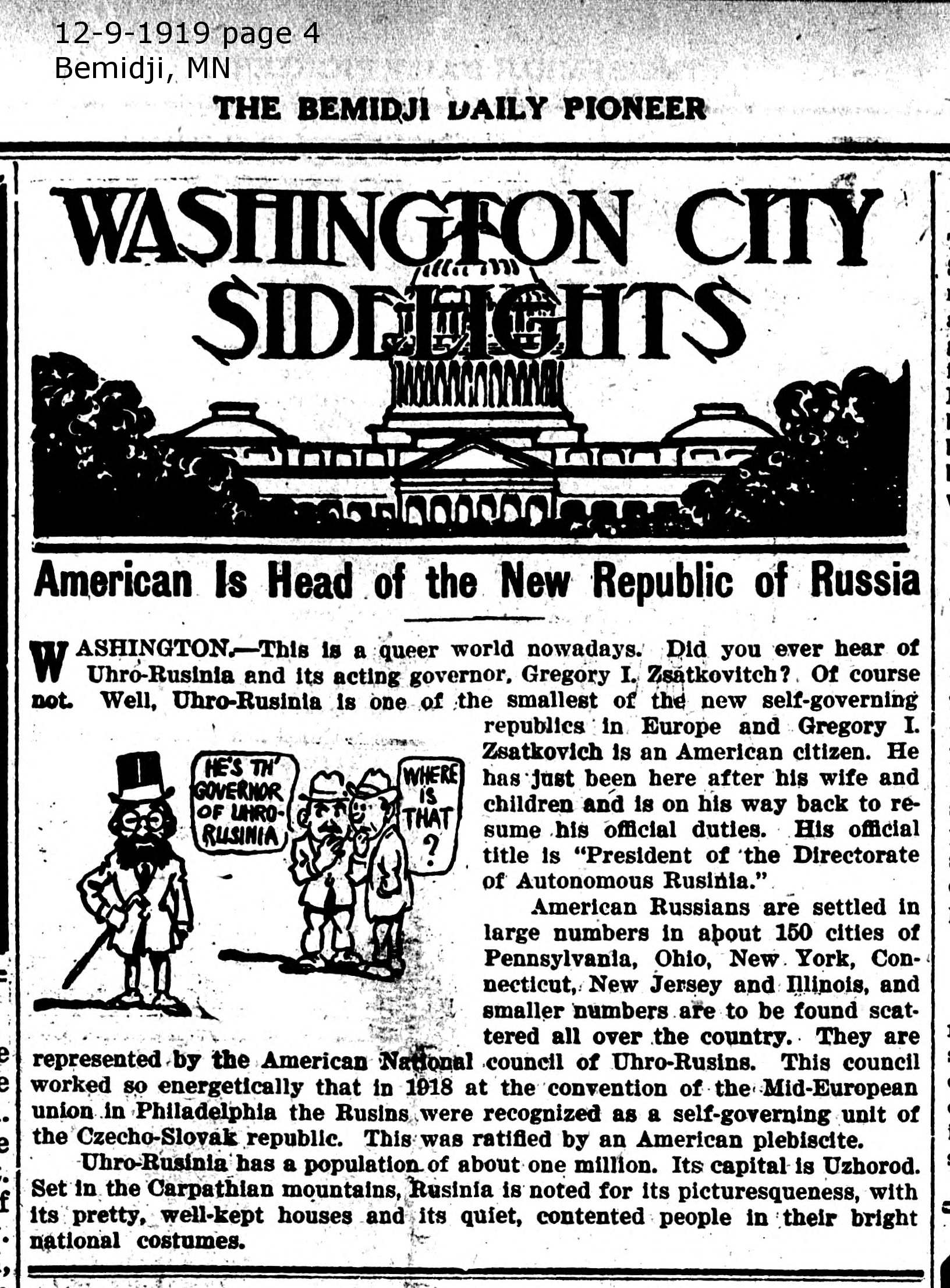
Gregory Žatkovich, Gov. of Ruthenia

The declared reasons for his resignation were the unkept promises, dissatisfaction with the untruthful borders inside Czechoslovakia, but primarily the fact Tomáš Garrigue Masaryk did not want to grant autonomy to Carpathian Ruthenia.

As noted, his tenure is a historical anomaly as the only American citizen ever acting as governor of a province that later became a part of the USSR.

== Later career ==
As a lawyer in Pittsburgh, Zhatkovich enjoyed a busy public career in the mid-1930s as an appointee of Republicans and independent Democrats. He briefly served as a workmen’s compensation referee (judge) in 1934 and 1936, appointed by successive Pennsylvania Secretaries of Labor and Industry, first Charlotte Carr and subsequently Ralph Moody Bashore. He later served as secretary (the equivalent of deputy mayor) to Pittsburgh mayor William N. McNair from May 1936 to September 1936, when McNair appointed him as the city solicitor of Pittsburgh. McNair resigned the following month, however, and McNair’s successor Cornelius Scully removed Zhatkovich as city solicitor and replaced him with Frederick Grote.

Zhatkovich was one of the founders of the American Slav Congress in 1942, but he resigned in 1944, charging that the organization had been infiltrated by Communists. He ran unsuccessfully as the Republican nominee for the U.S. congressional seat held by Democrat Herman Eberharter in 1944. Zhatkovich was also the organizer and president of the Central Council of the Slavic and Allied Civic Leagues of Allegheny County. He served as the legal advisor to Rev. Basil Takach, the bishop of the Byzantine Catholic Rite Diocese of Pittsburgh.

== Death ==
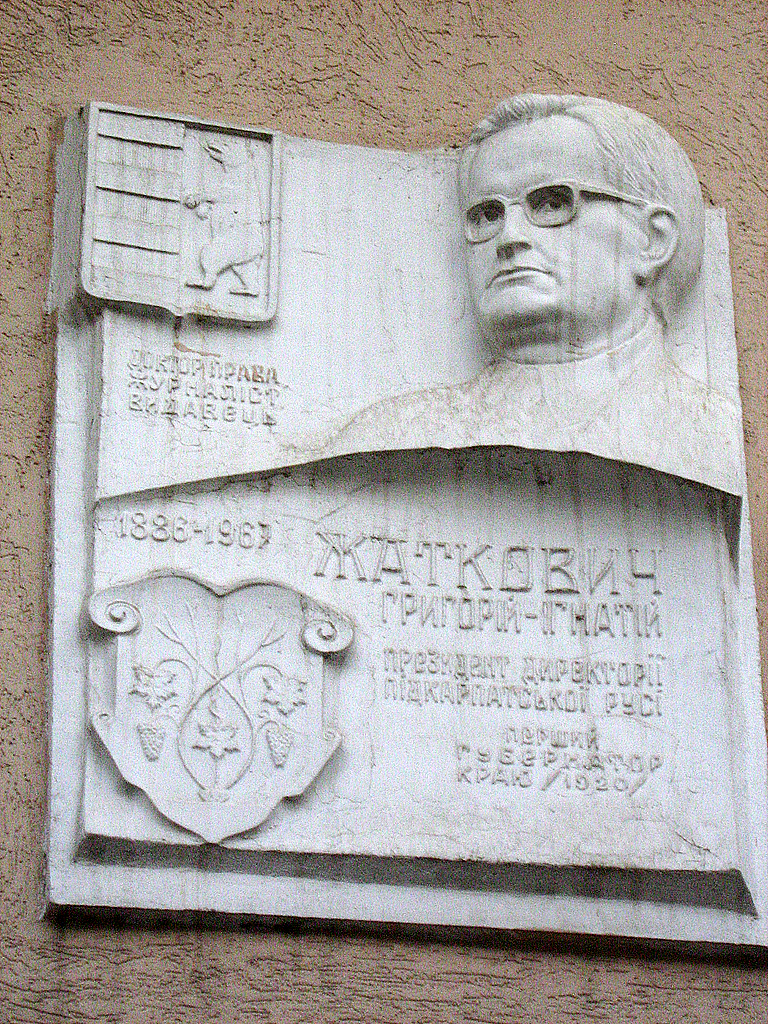
Memorial in Svaliava, Ukraine

Zhatkovich died in Pittsburgh in 1967 at the age of 80 and was interred there at Calvary Cemetery.

== Publications ==
- Zatkovich, Gregory. The Rusin Question in a Nutshell. OCLC 22065508.

== In fiction ==
The third part of the novel "A Carpathian Rhapsody", by the Hungarian left-wing writer Béla Illés – whose plot takes place in Carpathian Ruthenia between the end of the 19th century and the aftermath of World War I – is called "Gregory Zhatkovich's Kingdom". The highly partisan book presents Zhatkovich in a negative way, claiming that he was the dupe of American and French business and military interests, and that he had little control of or interest in the territory placed under his charge.

The book also asserts that the imperial interests which placed Zhatkovich in charge were mainly interested in using the territory as a conduit for arms and ammunition to the anti-Soviet Polish forces fighting the Polish-Soviet War of 1920, than going on directly to the north, and that Zhatkovich had to resign after failing to stop local Communists from holding strikes as well as repeatedly sabotaging the railway line from Prague, through which the munitions were passing.

== See also ==
- Carpathian Ruthenia
