= Rusyn Americans =

Americans of Rusyn or Carpatho-Ruthenian birth or descent

Rusyn Americans Русиньскы Америчаны
Total population
- 7,583; U.S. Estimate, 2019, self-reported 620,000; Estimate by Paul R. Magocsi, 2012

Regions with significant populations
- Northeast, Midwest; Pittsburgh, Johnstown

Languages
- American English, Rusyn, Ukrainian, Russian, Slovak, Czech

Religion
- Majority Eastern Catholic (Ruthenian Greek Catholic); Eastern Orthodox (Carpatho-Russian Orthodox); Minority Roman Catholic

Related ethnic groups
- Other Rusyns, Polish Americans, Romanian Americans, Russian Americans, Slovak Americans, Ukrainian Americans

Rusyn Americans (Rusyn: Русиньскы Америчаны), also known as Carpatho-Rusyn Americans, are Americans with ancestors that were Rusyns, from Carpathian Ruthenia or neighboring areas of Central Europe. However, some Rusyn Americans identify as Ukrainian Americans, Slovak Americans or even Russian Americans.

They are sometimes also referred to as Carpatho-Ruthenian Americans or Carpatho-Russian Americans; however, terms based on Ruthenian or Russian designations are often viewed as imprecise, since they have several wider meanings, related to their diverse historical, religious and ethnic uses and scopes, that were encompassing various East Slavic groups.

Since the Revolutions of 1989, there has been a revival in Rusyn nationalism and self-identification in both Carpathian Ruthenia and among the Rusyn diaspora in other parts of Europe and North America.

== History ==
Rusyns began immigrating to the United States in the late 1870s and in the 1880s. Upon arrival in North America, the vast majority of Rusyns identified with the larger state from which they had left. It is, therefore, impossible to know their exact number. It is estimated that between the 1880s and 1914 some 225,000 Carpatho-Rusyn immigrants came to northeastern United States. Based on immigration statistics and membership records in religious and secular organizations, it is reasonable to assume that there are about 620,000 Americans who have at least one ancestor of Rusyn background.

At the time of the first and largest wave of immigration (1880s to 1914), the Rusyn homeland was located entirely within the Austro-Hungarian Empire. In both parts of Austria-Hungary, the economic situation for Rusyns was the same. Their approximately 1,000 villages were all located in hilly or mountainous terrain from which the inhabitants eked out a subsistence-level existence based on small-scale agriculture, livestock grazing (especially sheep), and seasonal labor on the richer plains of lowland Hungary.

Since earning money was the main goal of the immigrants, they settled primarily in the northeast and north central states, in particular the coal mining region around Scranton–Wilkes-Barre in northeastern Pennsylvania and in the Pittsburgh and Erie areas in the west of Pennsylvania. Other cities and metropolitan areas that attracted Rusyns were Philadelphia, Pennsylvania; New York City and northeastern New Jersey; southern Connecticut; the Binghamton area in south central New York; Cleveland and Youngstown, Ohio; Chicago, Illinois; Gary and Whiting, Indiana; Detroit and Flint, Michigan; and the Minneapolis–Saint Paul area in Minnesota. By 1920, nearly 80 percent of all Rusyns lived in only three states: Pennsylvania (54 percent), New York (13 percent), and New Jersey (12 percent). There were concentrations of Rusyn communities in the coal regions of southern Illinois, including Royalton, Dowell, Muddy, Buckner, Benld, and DuQuoins. In Missouri and Kansas, small concentrations of Rusyns have also been noted. Rusyn communities exist in Cities like St. Louis and small mining towns in the Ozarks such as Bonne Terre and Desloge. There are also Rusyn populations in the Kansas City Metropolitan Area, especially in Sugar Creek and Saint Joseph where Byzantine Rite churches had been established.

These communities published books and newspapers in Rusyn. By the 1910s, there were several newspapers written in Rusyn. The book dealer George Sabo and the Greek Catholic Union Typography company were the main publishers of Rusyn books in America until the 1950s.

Like other Eastern and Southern Europeans, Rusyns were effectively segregated from the rest of American society because of their low economic status and lack of knowledge of English. This was, however, a relatively short-term phase, since the American-born sons and daughters of the original immigrants had, by the late 1930s and 1940s, assimilated and become absorbed into the American mainstream.

== Cultural Center ==
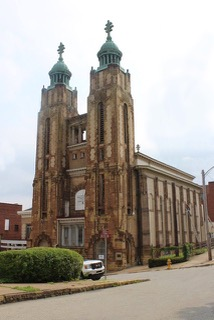
Carpatho-Rusyn Cultural and Educational Center, Munhall, PA

The Carpatho-Rusyn Society has purchased the historic former Cathedral of St. John the Baptist in Munhall, Pennsylvania, to convert it into the nation's first National Carpatho-Rusyn Cultural Center.

The historic structure was the first cathedral in America exclusively for Carpatho-Rusyns. It was built in 1903 at the corner of Tenth and Dickson Streets in Munhall, just outside of Pittsburgh. Designed by the Hungarian-born architect, Titus de Bobula, and patterned after the Rusyn Greek Catholic Cathedral of the Exaltation of the Holy Cross in Uzhorod, Subcarpathian Rus. The parish was established in 1897 and the church, the parish's second, was built in 1903. By the 1920s the congregation had more than 700 families. In 1929 it was chosen as the cathedral for the Ruthenian Greek Catholic Exarchate in America.

The congregation, then known as St. John the Baptist Byzantine Catholic parish, left the building in 1993 when it constructed a new suburban cathedral. In April 2004, the property was purchased by the Carpatho-Rusyn Society to create a home and center for the organization and culture.

== Sources ==
- Dyrud, Keith P. (1992). The Quest for the Rusyn Soul: The Politics of Religion and Culture in Eastern Europe and in America, 1890-World War I. Philadelphia: Balch Institute Press. ISBN 9780944190104.
- Marti, Federico (2009). I rutheni negli Stati Uniti: Santa Sede e mobilità umana tra Ottocento e Novecento. Milano: Giuffrè. ISBN 9788814145902.
- Magocsi, Paul R. (2000) [1988]. The Carpatho-Rusyn Americans (2. ed.). New York-Philadelphia: Chelsea House Publishers. ISBN 9780791062845.
- Magocsi, Paul R. (2005) [1984]. Our People: Carpatho-Rusyns and Their Descendants in North America (4. rev. ed.). Wauconda: Bolchazy-Carducci Publishers. ISBN 9780865166110.
- Magocsi, Paul R. (2011). "The Fourth Rus': A New Reality in a New Europe" (PDF). Journal of Ukrainian Studies. 35-36 (2010-2011): 167–177.
- Magocsi, Paul R. (2015). With Their Backs to the Mountains: A History of Carpathian Rus' and Carpatho-Rusyns. Budapest-New York: Central European University Press. ISBN 9786155053467.
- Magocsi, Paul R.; Pop, Ivan I., eds. (2005) [2002]. Encyclopedia of Rusyn History and Culture (2. rev. ed.). Toronto: University of Toronto Press.
- Slivka, John (1973). Correct nomenclature: Greek rite or Byzantine rite: Rusin or Ruthenian: Rusin or Slovak?. Brooklyn, N.Y.
- Slivka, John (1978). Historical Mirror: Sources of the Rusin and Hungarian Greek Rite Catholics in the United States of America, 1884-1963. Brooklyn, N.Y.
- Slivka, John (1989) [1977]. Who are we?: Nationality: Rusin, Russian, Ruthenian, Slovak? Ecclesiastical name: Greek Rite Catholic, Byzantine Rite Catholic? (2. ed.). Brooklyn, N.Y.
