= Greek Catholic Union of the USA =

Fraternal benefit society

- Established: February 14, 1892; 134 years ago
- Founded at: Wilkes-Barre, Pennsylvania, United States
- Type: Mutual aid society
- Region served: United States
- Website: gcuusa.com
- Formerly called: Greek Catholic Union of Rusyn Brotherhoods in the USA

The Greek Catholic Union of the USA (GCU) is the oldest continuous fraternal benefit society for Rusyn immigrants and their descendants in the United States, and established a Byzantine Catholic Church, Saint Nicholas Chapel, near their home office in Beaver, Pennsylvania.

== History ==
Founded as the Greek Catholic Union of Rusyn Brotherhoods in the USA (GCU) in Wilkes-Barre, Pennsylvania on 14 February 1892, it was headquartered for most of the 20th century in the heart of Pittsburgh, Pennsylvania's steel valley in Homestead. In 1987 it moved to a large tract of land in suburban Pittsburgh near Beaver.

The society was formed by the union of fourteen independent Greek Catholic lodges. Its early goals included promoting unity, education, and assistance for its members. A junior division for children 6 to 16 was created in 1906 and a gymnastic branch was created in 1911

The order has historically had a close relationship with the Greek Catholic Church. Many local units, or "Subordinate Lodges", grew out of the Churches parishes and a spiritual advisor is one of the regular officers. This officer takes a pledge in the name of God in the Holy Trinity, the Virgin Mary, St. Nicholas, the Lodges patron saint and all the other saints. However, there is no fraternal ritual.

Membership, in 1979, was limited to members of the Catholic church (in either the Greek Rite or Roman Rite) who were of Rusyn or Slav descent, or the spouse of the same. The maximum age was Sixty five. The Union had a consistent membership of about 50,000 from 1965 to 1979. Its current membership is listed as "over 40,000".

Its flagship publication was Amerikansky Russky Viestnik.

GCU was active politically in the early twentieth century, especially in securing a place for Rusyns in the new nation of Czechoslovakia. Also GCU consistently opposed the notion that Rusyns are Ukrainians, arguing instead that they are a distinct nationality. GCU membership peaked in the 1920s at over 130,000 in more than 1,000 lodges throughout the United States.

In the 21st century, when Rusyn Americans are well integrated into American society, GCU operates largely as an insurance organization with assets of over $1 billion. It also manages Seven Oaks Country Club and a housing development community on its estate.

== See also ==
- Rusyn Americans
