= Phebe Hobson Fowler Architectural Award =

American awards in 1929 and 1930

The Phebe Hobson Fowler Architectural Award was established in 1928 by Charles Evan Fowler in honor of his mother, and was awarded by the American Society of Civil Engineers in 1929 and 1930 for outstanding contributions to architecture. Each of the awards consisted of three prizes.

== Recipients ==
- 1929
  - Gustav Lindenthal for the Hell Gate Bridge in New York City, NY
  - John D. Stevenson for Greenfield Bridge in Pittsburgh, PA
  - Edward L. Woodruff for the Angels Gate Lighthouse in Los Angeles, CA
- 1930
  - Morris Goodkind for his design of the Raritan River's Morris Goodkind Bridge
  - Charles M. Spofford for the design of the former Champlain Bridge
  - G. F. Burch for the design of the Dixon Springs Bridge
