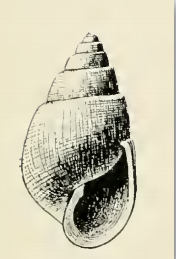
- Apertural view of a shell of Odostomia subturrita

Scientific classification
- Kingdom: Animalia
- Phylum: Mollusca
- Class: Gastropoda
- Family: Pyramidellidae
- Genus: Odostomia
- Species: O. subturrita

Binomial name
- Odostomia subturrita Dall & Bartsch, 1909

Synonyms
- Aartsenia subturrita (Dall & Bartsch, 1909); Odostomia (Amaura) subturrita Dall & Bartsch, 1909

= Odostomia subturrita =

Species of gastropod

Odostomia subturrita is a species of sea snail, a marine gastropod mollusc in the family Pyramidellidae, the pyrams and their allies.

== Description ==
The light yellow shell has an ovate shape. The length measures 6.9 mm. The whorls of the protoconch are small, deeply obliquely immersed in the first of the succeeding turns, above which only the tilted edge of the last volution projects. The six whorls of the teleoconch are flattened, scarcely at all contracted at the sutures, with a very broad tabulate summit, crossed by numerous spiral striations, which are a little darker colored than the general surface of the shell. The periphery and the base of the body whorl are somewhat inflated, well rounded. They are marked like the space between the sutures. The aperture is large, oblong-ovate, slightly effuse anteriorly. The posterior angle is very obtuse. The outer lip is thick within, thin at the edge. The columella is curved, somewhat twisted, and strongly reflected. It is provided with a strong fold a little anterior to its insertion.

== Distribution ==
This species occurs in the Pacific Ocean off San Pedro Bay, California.
