= Long Beach Light =

Lighthouse in California, United States

Long Beach Light Robot Light
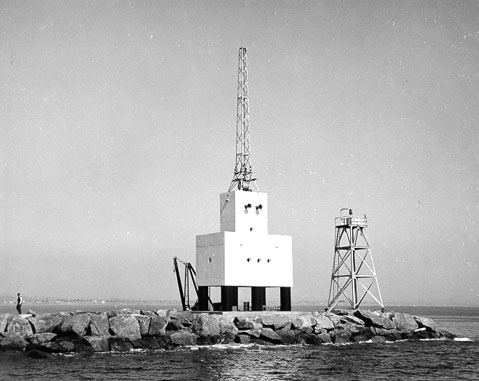
- Robot Light, taken 1949 by U.S. Coast Guard Archive
- Location: Long Beach Harbor; California; United States
- Coordinates: 33.723237°N 118.186821°W

Tower
- Constructed: n/a (first)
- Foundation: concrete piles
- Construction: concrete building (current) metal skeletal tower (first)
- Automated: 1949
- Height: 42 feet (13 m)
- Shape: two-stage rectangular building with light on flat roof (current) square tower with double balcony and lanten (first)
- Markings: white building (current)
- Operator: United States Coast Guard
- Fog signal: blast every 30s. continuously

Light
- First lit: 1949 (current)
- Focal height: 50 feet (15 m)
- Lens: 36 inches (910 mm)
- Range: 20 nautical miles (37 km; 23 mi)
- Characteristic: Fl W 5s.

Long Beach Light also known as the Long Beach Harbor Light, is a lighthouse on Long Beach Harbor in California.

== History ==
Long Beach Harbor Light looks different from a traditional lighthouse. Labeled the "robot light" when established in 1949, it is completely automated and was the forerunner of the new version of 20th-century lighthouses on America's West Coast. The 42-foot (13 m) high white, rectangular tower with a columnar base, features a 36-inch (910 mm) airway-type beacon and is controlled by the ANRAC system from the Los Angeles Harbor Light. The three-story facility, of monolithic design, is built of concrete supported on six cement columns cast into six pockets of a crib. It had dual tone fog signals and a radio beacon.

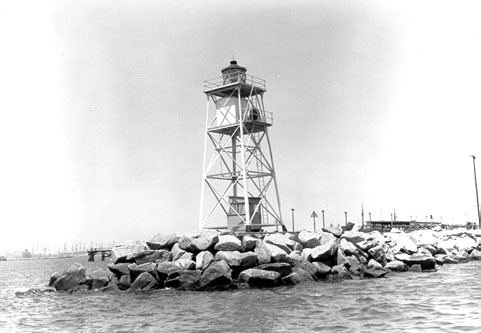
Original Light Tower by U.S. Coast Guard Archive

In its commanding position in San Pedro's middle breakwater, the lighthouse was considered an uncanny mechanical wonder when first established. Later, another navigation light in the Long Beach area was erected atop the pilot station at the Port of Long Beach in 1968. Marking the harbor entrance channel, the light is accompanied by one of the United States Coast Guard's radar scanners.

This lighthouse is inaccessible to the public but can be viewed from East Ocean Boulevard at Long Beach Harbor.

== See also ==
- List of lighthouses in the United States
- San Pedro Bay (California)
