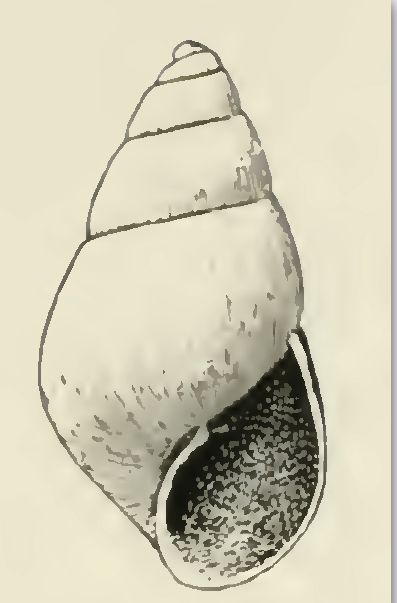
- Apertural view of Odostomia callimene

Scientific classification
- Kingdom: Animalia
- Phylum: Mollusca
- Class: Gastropoda
- Family: Pyramidellidae
- Genus: Odostomia
- Species: O. callimene

Binomial name
- Odostomia callimene Bartsch, 1912

Synonyms
- Evalea callimene Bartsch, 1912; Odostomia (Evalea) callimene Bartsch, 1912

= Odostomia callimene =

Species of gastropod

Odostomia callimene is a species of sea snail, a marine gastropod mollusc in the family Pyramidellidae, the pyrams and their allies.

== Description ==
The elongate-ovate shell is milk-white. The shell measures 3.1 mm. The nuclear whorls are small, obliquely immersed in the first of the succeeding turns, above which only half of the last volution projects. The projecting portion extends considerably beyond the outline of the post-nuclear spire. The five post-nuclear whorls are slightly rounded, somewhat constricted at the summit. They are marked by almost vertical lines of growth and very regular, closely spaced, wavy, spiral striations; of the latter about 25 occur between the sutures and the third whorl. The periphery of the body whorl is decidedly inflated and strongly rounded. The base of the shell is moderately long, well rounded, with a narrow umbilicus, marked like the spire. The sutures are moderately impressed. The aperture is large, slightly effuse anteriorly. The posterior angle is acute. The outer lip is very thin. The inner lip is quite long, decidedly flexuose and somewhat reflected. It is provided with a strong fold opposite the umbilical chink. The parietal wall is glazed with a thin callus.

== Distribution ==
This species occurs in the Pacific Ocean off San Pedro, California.
