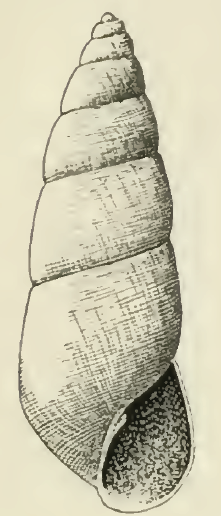
- Apertural view of Odostomia baldridgeae

Scientific classification
- Kingdom: Animalia
- Phylum: Mollusca
- Class: Gastropoda
- Family: Pyramidellidae
- Genus: Odostomia
- Species: O. baldridgeae

Binomial name
- Odostomia baldridgeae Bartsch, 1912

Synonyms
- Evalea baldridgeae Bartsch, 1912; Odostomia (Evalea) baldridgeae Bartsch, 1912

= Odostomia baldridgeae =

Species of gastropod

Odostomia baldridgeae is a species of sea snail, a marine gastropod mollusc in the family Pyramidellidae, the pyrams and their allies.

The epithet of this species refers to Mrs. B. L. Baldridge.

== Description ==
The shell is very elongate-conic, yellowish-white. It measures 5.6 mm. The small nuclear whorls are immersed in the first of the succeeding turns, above which only half of the last volution projects. The seven post-nuclear whorls are situated high between the sutures. They are appressed at the summit and slightly rounded. They are marked by feeble lines of growth, and many sub-equal and subequally spaced, strongly incised, spiral lines. About 25 of these occur between the sutures of the fourth whorl and about 30 between the summit and the periphery on the penultimate turn. The sutures are strongly impressed. The periphery of the body whorl is somewhat angulated. The base of the shell is well rounded, moderately long, marked like the spire. The aperture is elongate-oval, slightly effuse anteriorly. The posterior angle is acute. The thin outer lip is decidedly sinuous, bent back at the posterior angle to almost form a notch. The inner lip is moderately long, oblique, slightly curved and slightly revolute, provided with a strong fold at its insertion. The parietal wall glazed with a thin callus.

== Distribution ==
This species occurs in the Pacific Ocean off San Pedro, California.
