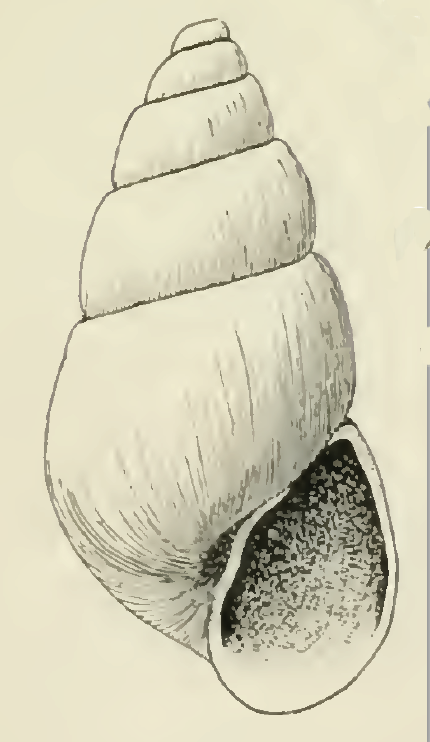
- Apertural view of Odostomia helena

Scientific classification
- Kingdom: Animalia
- Phylum: Mollusca
- Class: Gastropoda
- Family: Pyramidellidae
- Genus: Odostomia
- Species: O. helena

Binomial name
- Odostomia helena Bartsch, 1912

Synonyms
- Odostomia (Amaura) helena Bartsch, 1912

= Odostomia helena =

Species of gastropod

Odostomia helena is a species of sea snail, a marine gastropod mollusc in the family Pyramidellidae, the pyrams and their allies.

== Description ==
Shell moderately large measuring 5 mm. It is yellowish-white, very elongate-ovate. The nuclear whorls are small, very obliquely immersed in the first of the succeeding turns, above which the tilted edge of the last volution only projects. The six post-nuclear whorls are subtabulately shouldered at the summit and well-rounded. They are apparently marked by incremental lines only. The sutures are strongly constricted. The periphery of the body whorl is somewhat inflated, well rounded. The base of the shell is short, well rounded and broadly umbilicated. It is marked like the spire. The ovate aperture moderately large. The posterior angle is obtuse. The outer lip is evenly curved. The inner lip is sinuous, reflected over, but not adnate to the base. The columella is provided with a strong oblique fold, which is about one-third of the distance of the length of the inner lip anterior to the insertion of the inner lip. The position of the columellar fold will distinguish this species at a glance from all the other California shells. The parietal wall is covered with a thick callus.

== Distribution ==
This species occurs in the Pacific Ocean off San Pedro, California.
