= Edward Woodruff =

Edward Woodruff may refer to:

- Edward Nelson Woodruff, mayor of Peoria, Illinois
- Edward L. Woodruff, American architect
