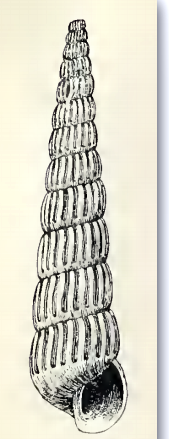
- Drawing of a shell of Turbonilla asser

Scientific classification
- Kingdom: Animalia
- Phylum: Mollusca
- Class: Gastropoda
- Family: Pyramidellidae
- Genus: Turbonilla
- Species: T. asser

Binomial name
- Turbonilla asser Dall & Bartsch, 1909

Synonyms
- Turbonilla (Strioturbonilla) asser Dall & Bartsch, 1909

= Turbonilla asser =

Species of gastropod

Turbonilla asser is a species of sea snail, a marine gastropod mollusk in the family Pyramidellidae, the pyrams and their allies.

== Description ==
The milk-white shell has an elongate-conic shape. Its length measures 8.3 mm. The two, small whorls of the protoconch are depressed and helicoid. They have their axis at right angles to that of the succeeding turns, in the first of which they are about one-third immersed. The 14 whorls of the teleoconch are well rounded, slightly overhanging, and ornamented by well developed, somewhat sinuous, rounded, protractive axial ribs, of which there are about 14 upon the third, 16 upon the fourth and fifth, 18 upon the sixth to eighth, 20 upon the ninth to eleventh, and 22 upon the twelfth and penultimate turns. The intercostal spaces are almost equal to the ribs in width, shallow, terminating some little distance posterior to the summit of the succeeding whorl, thus leaving a rather broad, plain band above the suture in each turn. The sutures are strongly constricted. The periphery of the body whorl is well rounded. The base of the shell is short, and well rounded. The entire surface of the spire and the base is marked by very fine, closely spaced, spiral striations. The aperture is subquadrate. The posterior angle is obtuse. The outer lip is thin, showing the external sculpture within. The columella is slender, well curved and slightly revolute.

== Distribution ==
This species occurs in the Pacific Ocean off San Pedro, California.
