= St. John Chrysostom Byzantine Catholic Church =

Ruthenian Greek Catholic church in the US

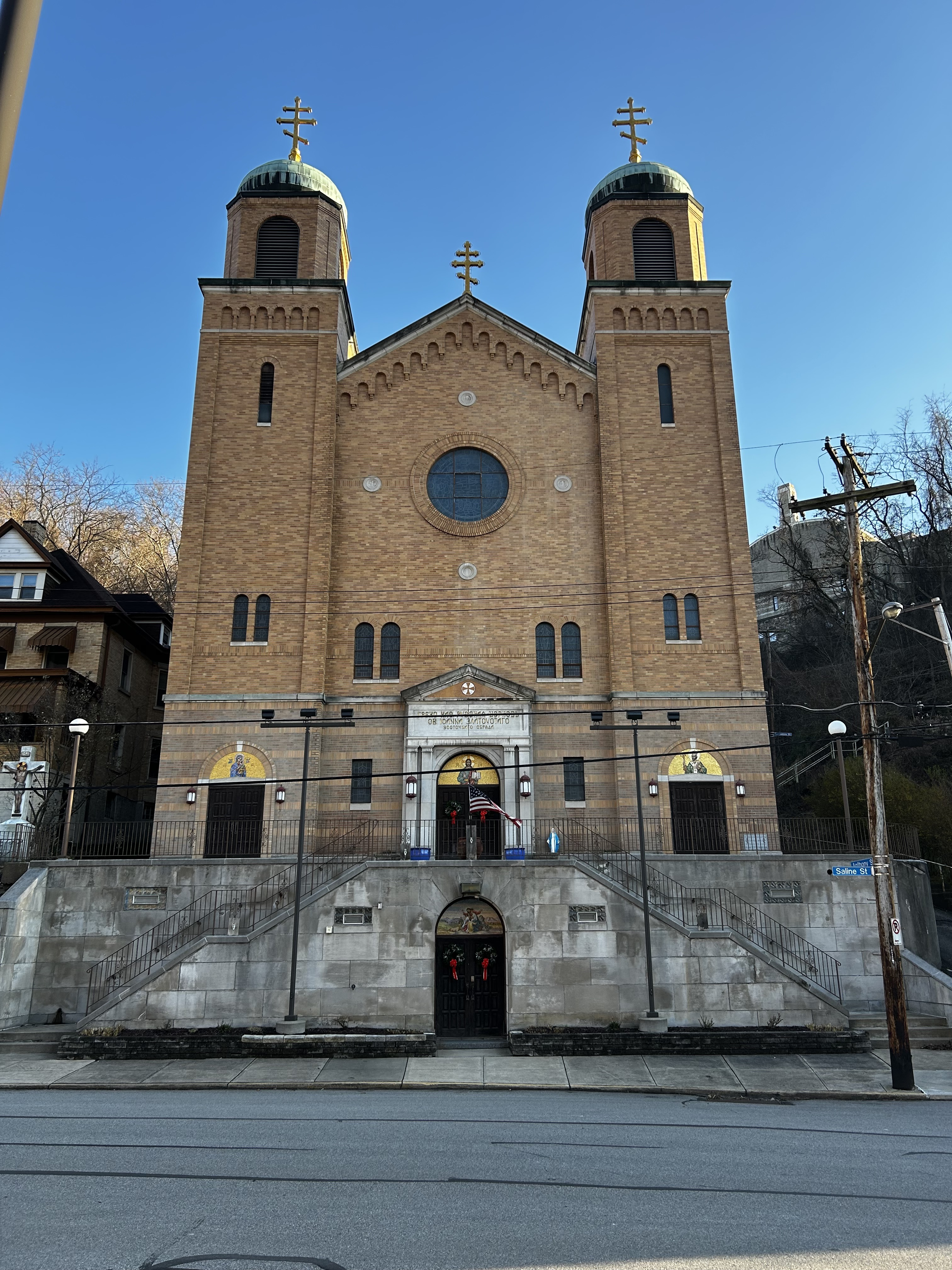
- St. John Chrysostom Byzantine Catholic Church

- Location within Pennsylvania Location within the United States
- 40°25′40″N 79°56′42″W
- Location: 506 Saline St; Pittsburgh, Pennsylvania
- Country: United States
- Denomination: Catholic Church
- Sui iuris church: Ruthenian Greek Catholic Church
- Website: sjcbcc.com//

History
- Status: Church
- Founded: 1932

Architecture
- Functional status: Active

Administration
- Diocese: Archeparchy of Pittsburgh

Clergy
- Bishop: William C. Skurla
- Rector: Reverend Miron Kerul-Kmec

St. John Chrysostom Byzantine Catholic Church is a Ruthenian Greek Catholic church in Pittsburgh, and is in full communion with the Roman Catholic Church. It primarily serves the descendants of immigrants of Rusyn descent and also descendants of immigrants from Slovakia, Ukraine, Hungary, and Romania. The Divine Liturgy is chanted in English.

The church is located in the neighborhood of Four Mile Run, which is an isolated section of Greenfield at the bottom of Junction Hollow. Because it faces the heavily traveled Interstate 376, or Parkway East, the church has become a well-known architectural landmark for many commuters because its onion domes and Slavic-style crosses are easily seen from the Interstate.

The church is best known for having been the family church of the artist Andy Warhol.

== History ==
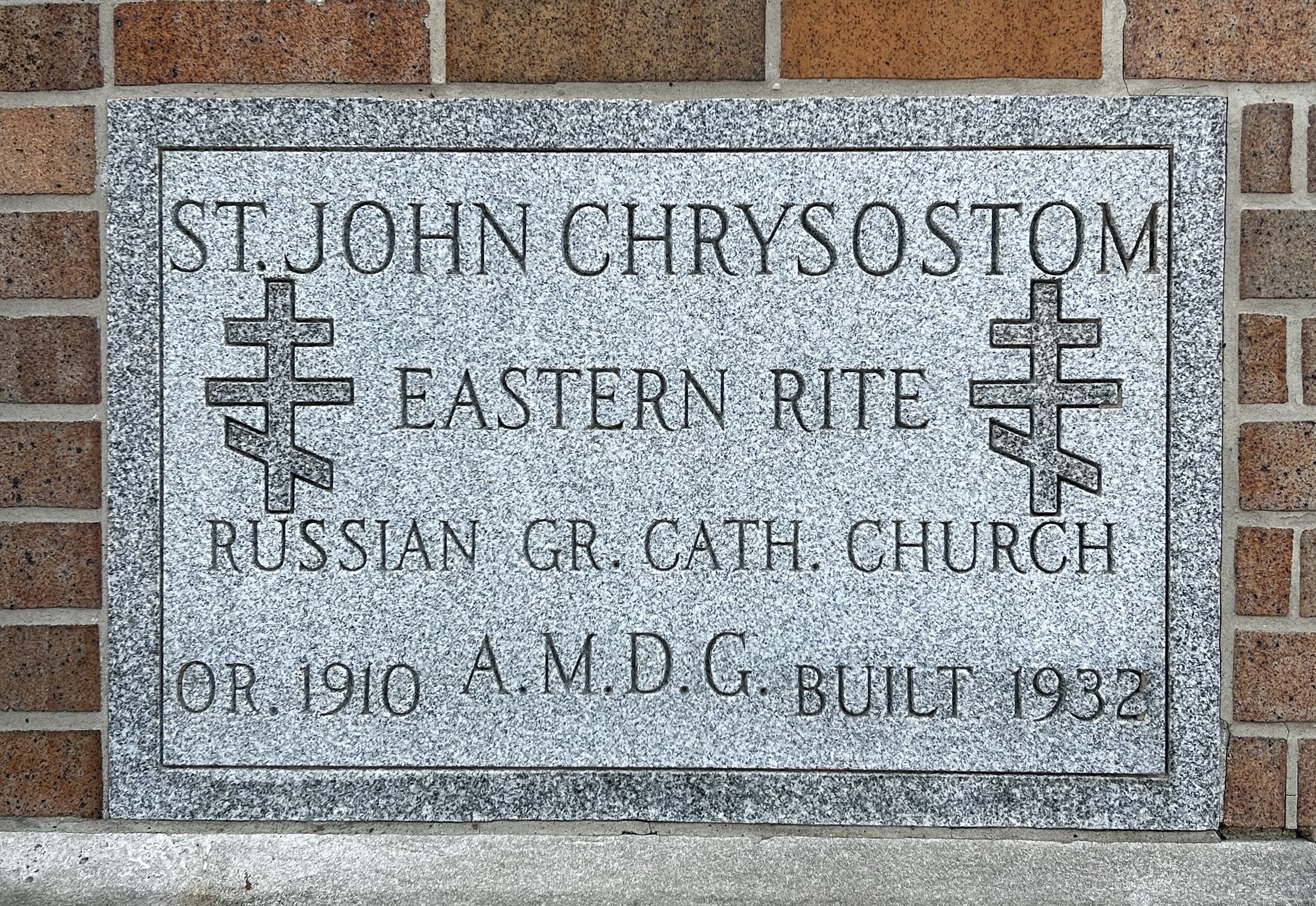
Datestone with both 1910 establishment and 1932 construction

A parish of the Byzantine Catholic Metropolitan Church of Pittsburgh, the American branch of the Ruthenian Greek Catholic Church, St. John Chrysostom Church was established in 1910 by Rusyn immigrants from the Carpathian Mountains. Most came to work in Pittsburgh's steel industry. Large numbers of Rusyns settled in a small valley called Four Mile Run, a part of the Greenfield neighborhood and adjacent to a large steel mill of the Jones and Laughlin Steel Company. Rusyn immigrants themselves dubbed the small settlement "Ruska Dolina", which translates as Rusyn Valley.

The church first met there in a hall on Saline Street. Rev. Alexij Petrasovich assumed his duties in August 1910, and the same year the church purchased five lots on Saline Street. The Greek Catholic Union of the USA helped to finance construction of the first church. By 1931 a larger building was needed to accommodate the growth of the parish. The congregation moved down the street to Saline and Anthony Streets, where the new and present church was completed in 1932. The original church served as a social hall until the 1960s.

The Byzantine Catholic Metropolitan Church of Pittsburgh's radio ministry began at St. John Chrysostom Church with broadcasts of Sunday Divine Liturgies in 1956. The Rev. John Bilock was the celebrant.

During the years 1994–1997 a church renovation project added new lighting and new icons by New Guild Studio throughout the church.

== Andy Warhol ==
Andy Warhol was baptized here and the Warhola family worshiped at the church during the artist's formative years (1928–1949) in Pittsburgh. They walked to services each week from their home on Dawson Street in Oakland. Some art historians speculate about the influence of the church's numerous and repeating icons on Andy Warhol's famous Pop Art style.

== Sources ==
- Bockris, Victor (1989). The Life and Death of Andy Warhol. New York: Bantam Books. ISBN 0-553-05708-1 – via Internet Archive.
- Byzantine-Ruthenian Metropolitan Church of Pittsburgh Directory. Byzantine Catholic Metropolitan Church of Pittsburgh. 1999. p. i. ISBN none.
- Kidney, Walter C. (1997). Pittsburgh's Landmark Architecture: The Historic Buildings of Pittsburgh and Allegheny County. Pittsburgh History & Landmarks Foundation. p. i. ISBN 0-916670-18-X.
- Toker, Franklin (1994) [First published 1986]. Pittsburgh: An Urban Portrait. University of Pittsburgh Press. p. i. ISBN 0-8229-5434-6 – via Internet Archive.
