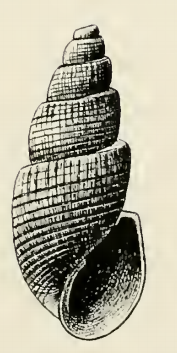
- Drawing of a shell of Odostomia turricula

Scientific classification
- Kingdom: Animalia
- Phylum: Mollusca
- Class: Gastropoda
- Family: Pyramidellidae
- Genus: Odostomia
- Species: O. turricula

Binomial name
- Odostomia turricula Dall & Bartsch, 1903

Synonyms
- Ivara turricula (Dall & Bartsch, 1903); Odostomia (Ivara) turricula Dall & Bartsch, 1903

= Odostomia turricula =

Species of gastropod

Odostomia turricula is a species of sea snail, a marine gastropod mollusc in the family Pyramidellidae, the pyrams and their allies.

== Description ==
The milk-white shell has a very elongate-ovate shape. Its length measures 4 mm. The whorls of the protoconch are smooth, obliquely immersed in the first of the succeeding turns, above which only the tilted edge of the last volution projects. The five whorls of the teleoconch are moderately rounded, very broadly tabulately shouldered at the summit, and moderately contracted at the periphery. They are marked by low, feebly developed axial ribs, which are best shown at the angle of the shoulder and scarcely extend to the suture. In addition to the axial ribs, the whorls are marked by well-incised spiral lines, of which 7 occur between the sutures on the second and 9 upon the third and the penultimate turn. The periphery and base of the body whorl are well rounded, the latter somewhat produced. They are marked by the very feeble continuation of the axial ribs and eight spiral lines. The aperture is ovate. The posterior angle is squarely truncated. The outer lip is thin. The columella is strongly curved and reflected over the reinforcing base. It is provided with a strong fold at its insertion.

== Distribution ==
The type species was found in the Pacific Ocean off San Pedro Bay, California.
