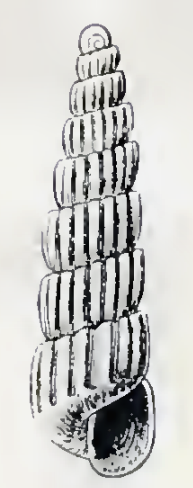
- Drawing of a shell of Turbonilla aepynota

Scientific classification
- Kingdom: Animalia
- Phylum: Mollusca
- Class: Gastropoda
- Family: Pyramidellidae
- Genus: Turbonilla
- Species: T. aepynota

Binomial name
- Turbonilla aepynota Dall & Bartsch, 1909

Synonyms
- Turbonilla (Chemnitzia) aepynota Dall & Bartsch, 1909

= Turbonilla aepynota =

Species of gastropod

Turbonilla aepynota is a species of sea snail, a marine gastropod mollusk in the family Pyramidellidae, the pyrams and their allies.

== Description ==
The small, diaphanous shell has an elongate-conic shape. Its length measures 3.2 mm. The 2½ whorls of the protoconch are small and helicoid. They form a moderately elevated spire, with their axis at right angles to that of the succeeding turns, in the first of which they are about one-fifth immersed. The eight whorls of the teleoconch are situated high between the sutures. They are very strongly shouldered at the summits, somewhat contracted at the periphery, and well rounded. They are marked by strong, sublamellar axial ribs that render the summits strongly crenulate. Sixteen of the axial ribs appear upon the first and second, 18 upon the third, fourth, and fifth, and 20 upon the remaining turns. The intercostal spaces a little wider than the ribs, deeply sunk below the general surface, and extend to the suture on all the turns of the spire. The sutures are strongly marked. The periphery of the body whorl is feebly angulated. The base of the shell is short, well rounded, and smooth. The aperture is rather large, and subquadrate. The posterior angle is obtuse. The outer lip is thin. It isbent abruptly anteriorly toward the columella, which it joins almost at right angles. The columella is very slender and gently curved.

== Distribution ==
The type specimen was found in the Pacific Ocean off San Pedro, Baja California.
