= Greenfield Bridge =

Bridge in Pittsburgh (opened 2017)

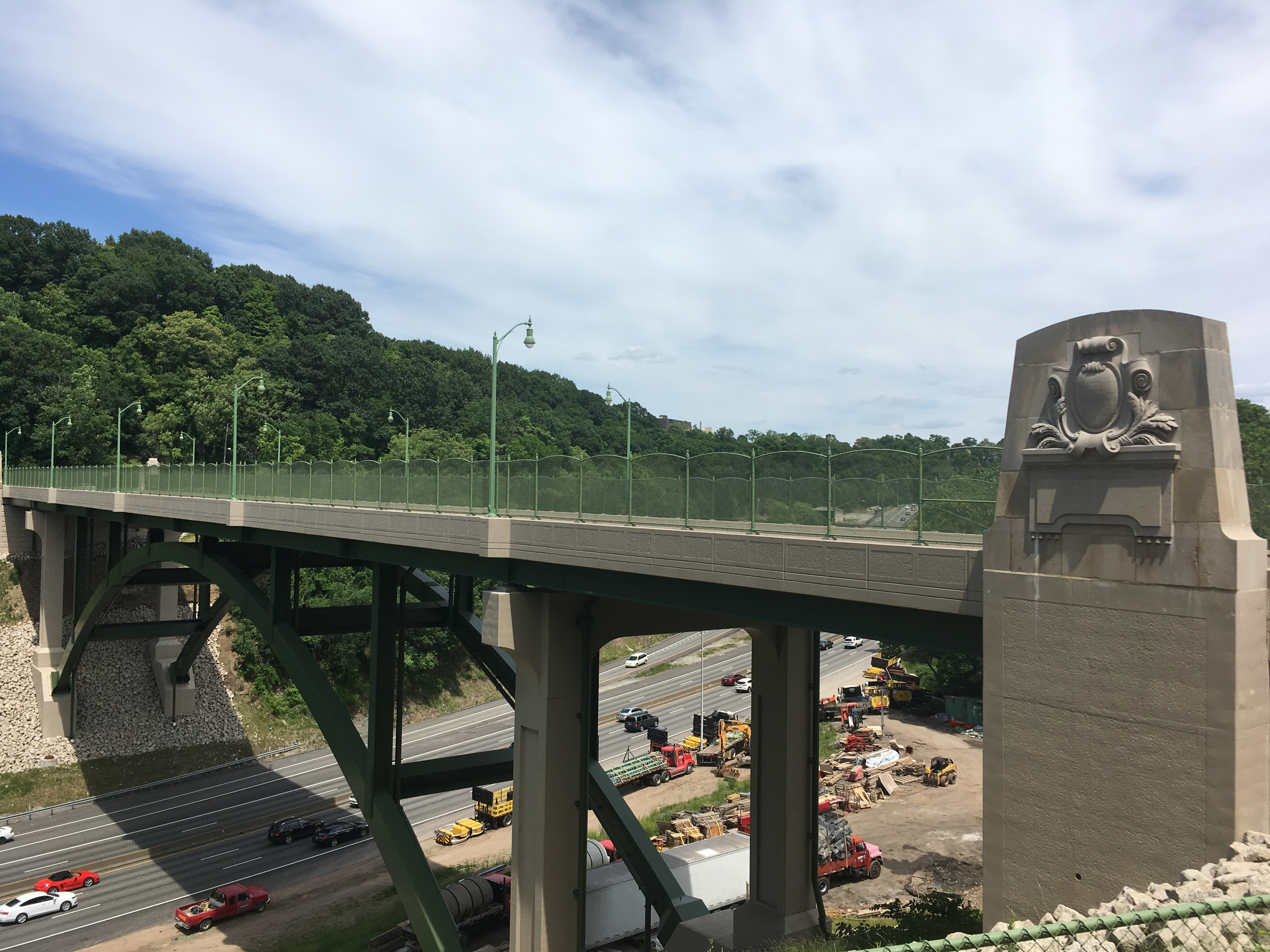
- The new Greenfield Bridge from the south
- Coordinates: 40.4282°N 79.9380°W
- Crosses: Four Mile Run, Interstate 376
- Official name: Beechwood Boulevard (Greenfield) Bridge II

Characteristics
- Material: Steel
- Total length: 462 feet (141 m)
- Width: 54.83 feet (16.71 m)
- Longest span: 287 feet (87 m)

History
- Engineering design by: HDR, Inc.
- Construction cost: $17.5 million
- Opened: October 15, 2017

Location
- Interactive map of Greenfield Bridge

The Greenfield Bridge, officially known as the Beechwood Boulevard (Greenfield) Bridge II, is a steel arch bridge located in Pittsburgh, Pennsylvania, United States. The bridge connects the neighborhoods of Greenfield and Squirrel Hill (specifically Schenley Park) across the valley known as Four Mile Run which separates them. The bridge also spans the Parkway East (I-376), which runs along the bottom of the valley.

The current steel bridge is the third bridge at this location. The original wooden bridge was built in 1891 and collapsed in 1921. This was replaced by a concrete arch bridge which was completed in 1923 and demolished in 2015 after falling into disrepair.

== First bridge ==
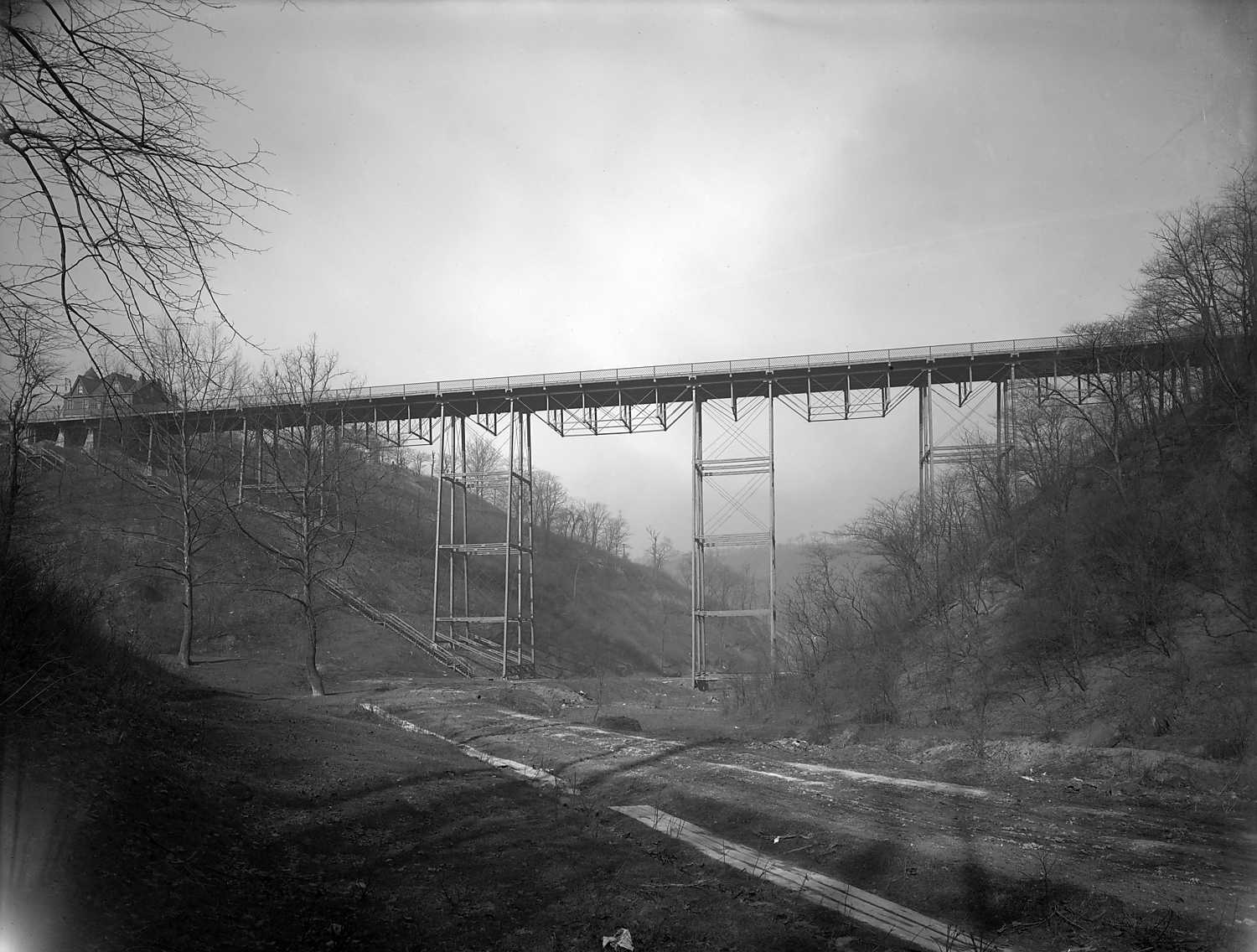
The original Greenfield Bridge in 1911

The original crossing at the site was a wooden deck truss bridge built in 1891, which was usually referred to as the Forward Avenue Bridge. It was about 378 feet (115 m) long and 30 feet (9.1 m) wide. In 1898, it became the southern terminus of the newly built Beechwood Boulevard, a 9-mile (14 km) carriageway following a circuitous route from Schenley Park north to Highland Park. Afterwards, the bridge was also known as the Beechwood Boulevard Bridge.

The bridge had serious structural problems and was repaired several times before finally collapsing on June 18, 1921. At the time of the collapse, the bridge had been closed to vehicular traffic for more than a year but was still used by pedestrians. No one was hurt in the disaster, which occurred at about 2:40 on a Saturday afternoon, though five people who had either just crossed the bridge or were about to cross narrowly escaped.

== Second bridge ==
The collapsed wooden bridge was replaced with an open-spandrel concrete arch bridge which was constructed in 1921–1923. It was completed by December 1922, but some of the approaches still needed to be filled in. The final cost was $370,000. This bridge was officially named the Beechwood Boulevard Bridge, but was generally referred to as the Greenfield Bridge. The bridge was 466 feet (142 m) in total length with a 274 foot (84 m) main span. It was designed by chief engineer Charles M. Reppert and architect Stanley L. Roush and featured decorative elements including ornamental entrance pylons, light standards, and urns. The City of Pittsburgh built six other similar bridges in the 1910s and 1920s, of which only the Larimer Avenue Bridge survives as of 2022.

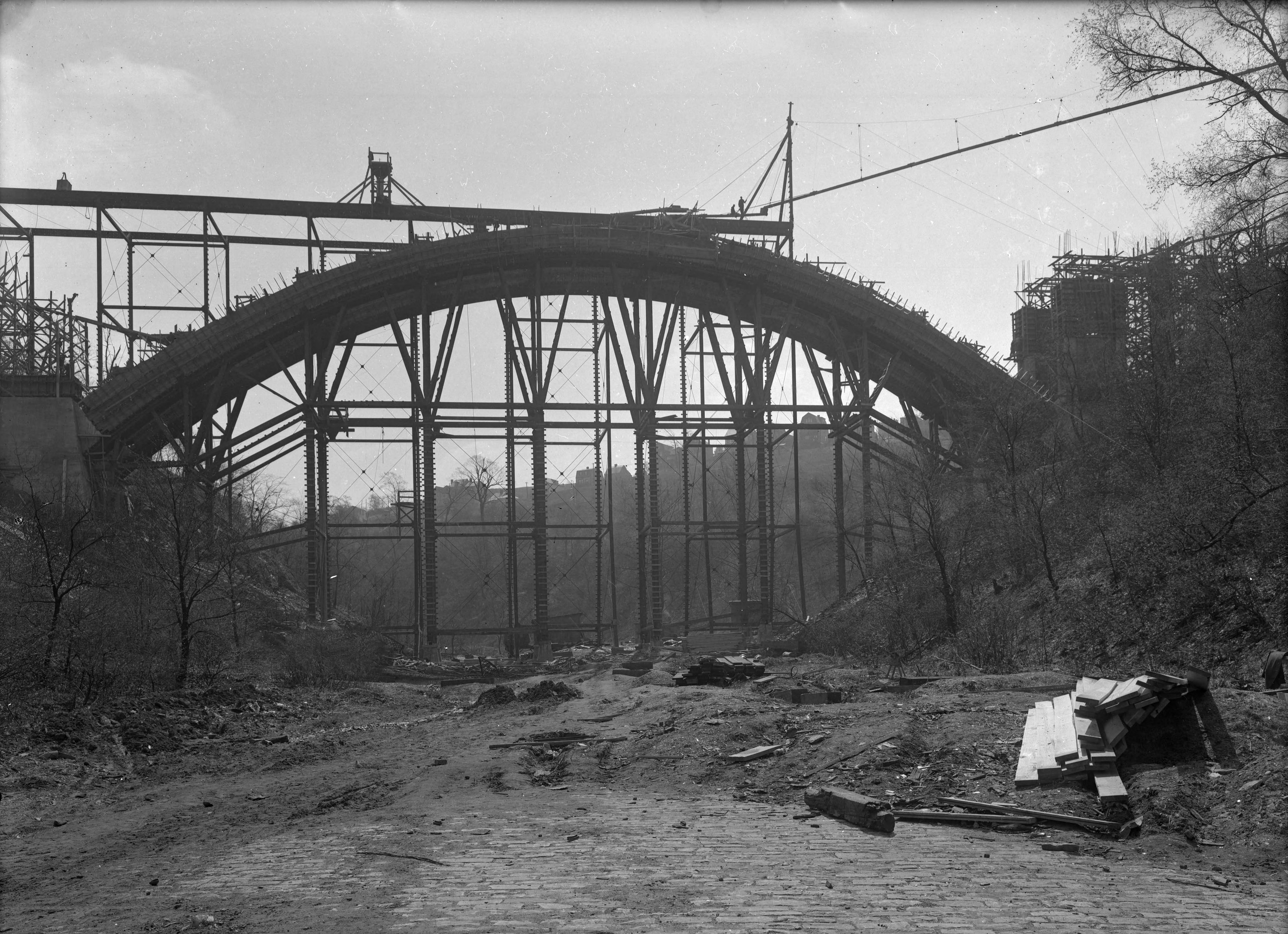
The second bridge during construction in 1922

By the 1970s, the bridge had begun to decay. Chunks of concrete fell from the bridge in 1970, necessitating a temporary closure for repairs. In 1980–81, the bridge received a $2.1 million rehabilitation including repairs to the concrete structure and a new deck. During this project, most of the decorative elements on the bridge deck were removed. Chunks of concrete again fell from the bridge in 1990, prompting the city to install safety netting. Despite the netting, more concrete fell a few days later, causing at least 20 accidents on the Parkway East and injuring several people. A city engineer said he suspected vandals may have thrown the concrete, though spotters watching the bridge did not see anyone.

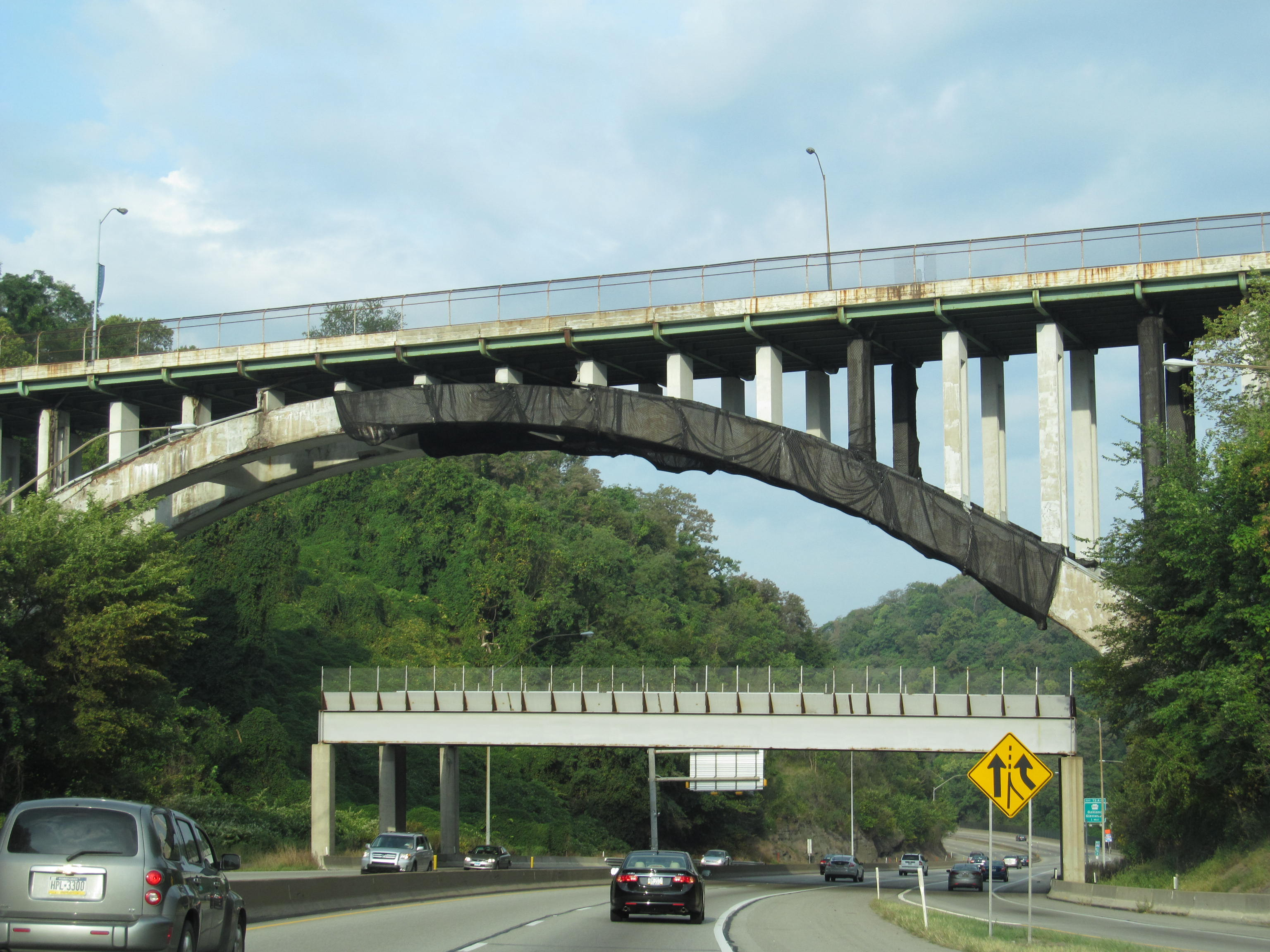
The second bridge in 2012, showing the safety netting and 'bridge under a bridge' added to protect vehicles from falling debris

A driver was injured by another piece of falling concrete under the Greenfield Bridge in 2003. An inspection concluded this fragment was not a piece of the bridge, but the city nevertheless constructed a 'bridge under a bridge' to protect the roadway from any additional falling debris. The decrepit condition of the bridge became "a national symbol of infrastructure failure" in the United States, and its poor condition was featured on 60 Minutes, Last Week Tonight with John Oliver, and (more light-heartedly) Pittsburgh Dad.

The bridge was imploded on December 28, 2015 at 9:20 am. The inbound side of I-376 reopened to traffic on the 31st, a day ahead of schedule. However, the outbound side suffered damage despite a protective layer of dirt placed under the bridge for the implosion and its reopening was delayed.

== Current bridge ==
The replacement bridge opened to traffic on October 15, 2017. It is officially known as the Beechwood Boulevard (Greenfield) Bridge II. The new bridge cost $17.5 million to construct and was designed and engineered by HDR, Inc.

The new bridge mimics the appearance of the original structure and many of the stone ornaments from the original bridge were restored and incorporated into it. The new bridge has wider lanes and sidewalks and a dedicated bicycle path. Its steel elements are painted green to reflect its connection to the community of Greenfield.
