= Fort Black =

- Greenfield, Pittsburgh
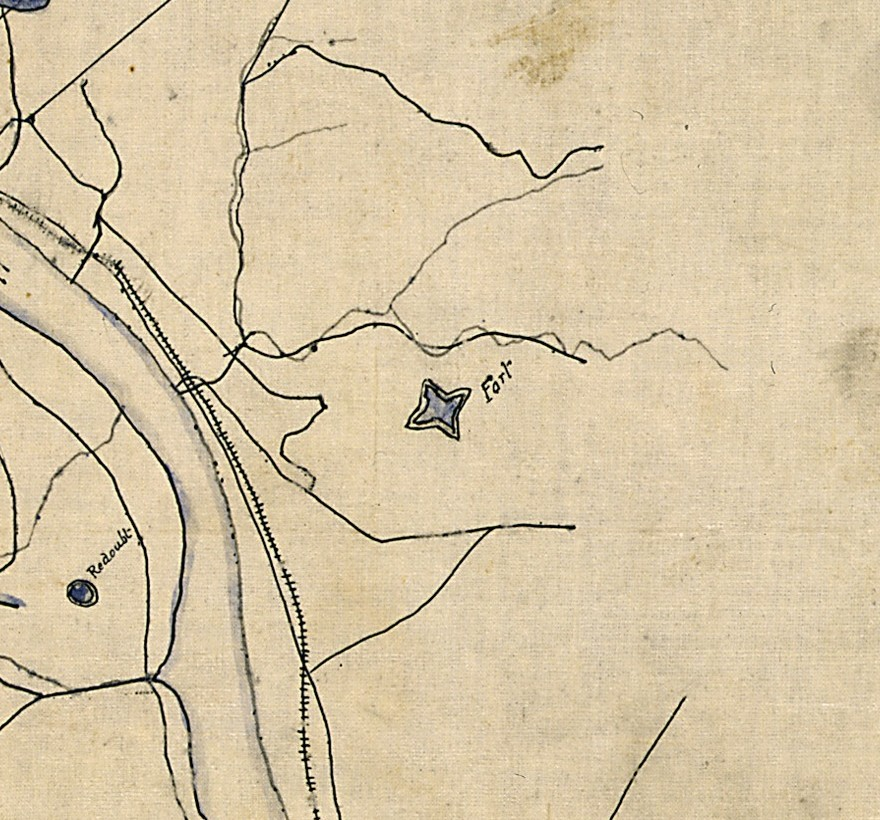
- Fort Black is marked "Fort" in this map.

Site information
- Type: Fort

Location
- Coordinates: 40.4188°N 79.9407°W

Site history
- Built: 1863
- Fate: No remains

Fort Black (also known as Fort Squirrel Hill and Fort Chess) was a fort built in the Greenfield neighborhood (then part of Squirrel Hill) of Pittsburgh, Pennsylvania in 1863, during the Civil War.

It was located on Bigelow Street (formerly Squirrel Hill Road) between Parade and Shields streets, and had cannons facing the Point, and trenches to protect soldiers.

The fort was one of the most massive of the 27 built at the time to defend Pittsburgh from the Confederates, and like the other forts, was built of mounds of dirt.

A powder magazine was also built nearby, on Beechwood Boulevard.

It remained standing until its demolition in 1928.
