= Larimer Avenue Bridge =

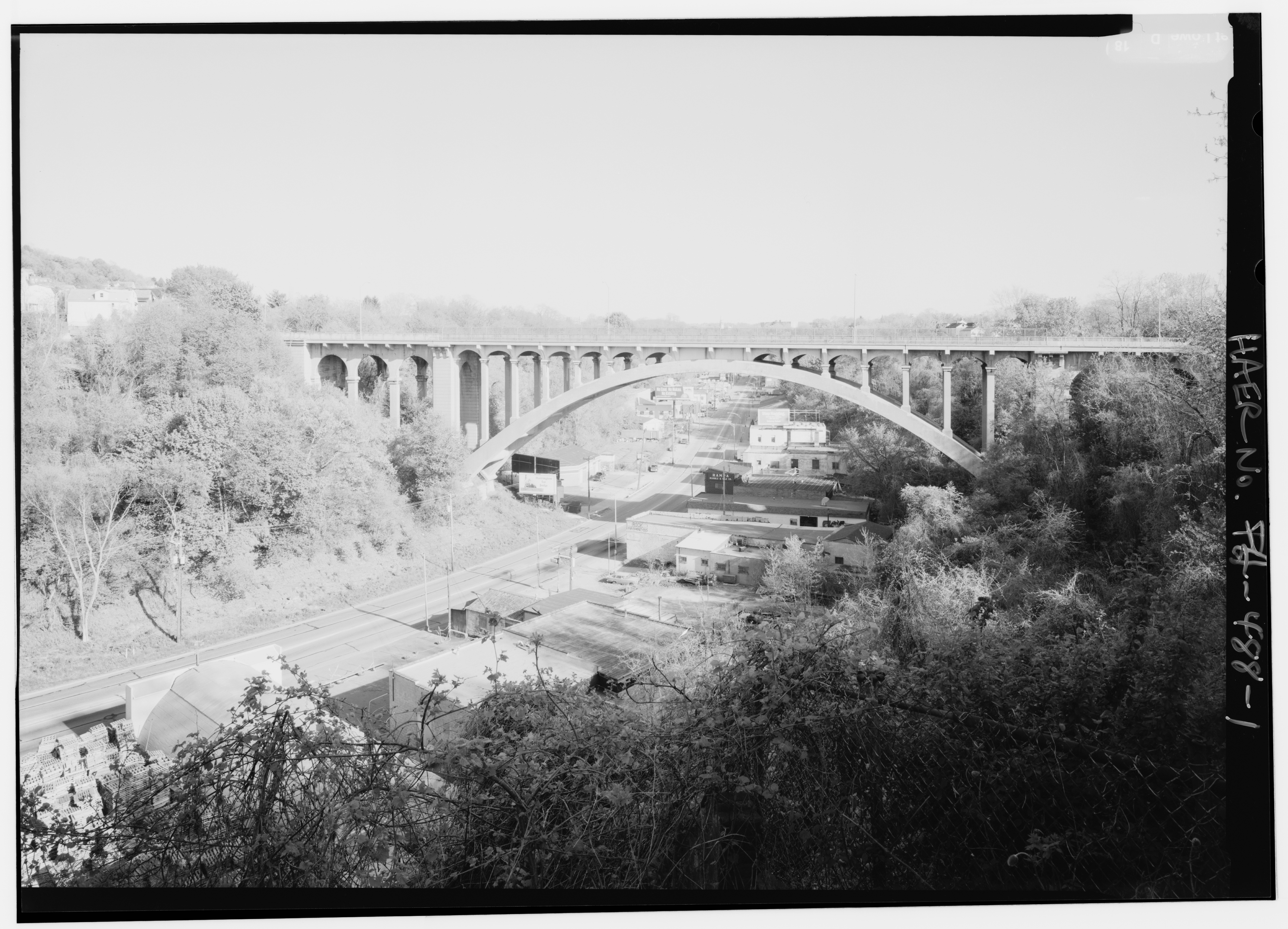
- Coordinates: 40.467471°N 79.908734°W
- Carries: Larimer Avenue
- Crosses: PA 8 (Washington Boulevard)
- Locale: Pittsburgh, Pennsylvania
- Official name: Larimer Avenue Bridge

Characteristics
- Material: Concrete
- Total length: 670 ft (200 m)
- Longest span: 300 ft 4 in (91.54 m)
- No. of lanes: 2

History
- Built: 1912

Statistics
- Daily traffic: Vehicles, Bikers

Location
- Interactive map of Larimer Avenue Bridge

The Larimer Avenue Bridge in Pittsburgh, Pennsylvania, is a 670-foot (200 m) concrete arch bridge built in 1912. It was resurfaced in 1980 and has since deteriorated due to its age. The bridge is the only one of 6 bridges in the Greater Pittsburgh region of this design to still stand.

== See also ==
- List of bridges documented by the Historic American Engineering Record in Pennsylvania
- Greenfield Bridge - Replaced bridge of similar style
