= Greenfield (Pittsburgh) =

- Neighborhood of Pittsburgh
- Coordinates: 40.422°N 79.942°W
- Country: United States
- State: Pennsylvania
- County: Allegheny County
- City: Pittsburgh

Area
  - Total: 0.773 sq mi (2.00 km^{2})

Population (2010)
  - Total: 7,294
  - Density: 9,440/sq mi (3,640/km^{2})

Greenfield is a neighborhood in the city of Pittsburgh, in the state of Pennsylvania in the United States. It is part of the city's 15th Ward along with Hazelwood and Glen Hazel. Greenfield is adjacent to the neighborhoods of Squirrel Hill to the north and east (including Schenley Park, which shares a long border with Greenfield), Hazelwood to the south and west, and Oakland to the northwest. Greenfield includes the geographically and culturally distinct sub-neighborhood of Four Mile Run, also known as Rusyn Valley. Pittsburgh Fire Station #12 is located in the neighborhood on Winterburn Avenue.

== History ==
In 1768, a large tract of woodland was purchased for $10,000 under the Treaty of Fort Stanwix made with the Native Americans. This area included what became Greenfield and neighboring Hazelwood, which today are both part of the city's 15th ward. By the late 1800s, many of Greenfield's residents were of Irish, Polish, Slovak, Italian, Hungarian, and Carpatho-Rusyn descent. They resided in Greenfield and traveled to Hazelwood, Homestead and Duquesne to work in the steel mills.

During the Civil War, Greenfield (part of Squirrel Hill at the time) was the site of a small redoubt, Fort Black on Bigelow Street between Parade and Shields streets, also known as Fort Chess or Fort Squirrel Hill.

== City steps ==
Greenfield is a hilly neighborhood with uneven terrain and 26 distinct flights of public steps, many of which are open to pedestrians. The public stairways in Pittsburgh provide pedestrian connections to public transportation, commercial areas, and playgrounds, and facilitate travel through the neighborhood's hilly and densely populated areas.

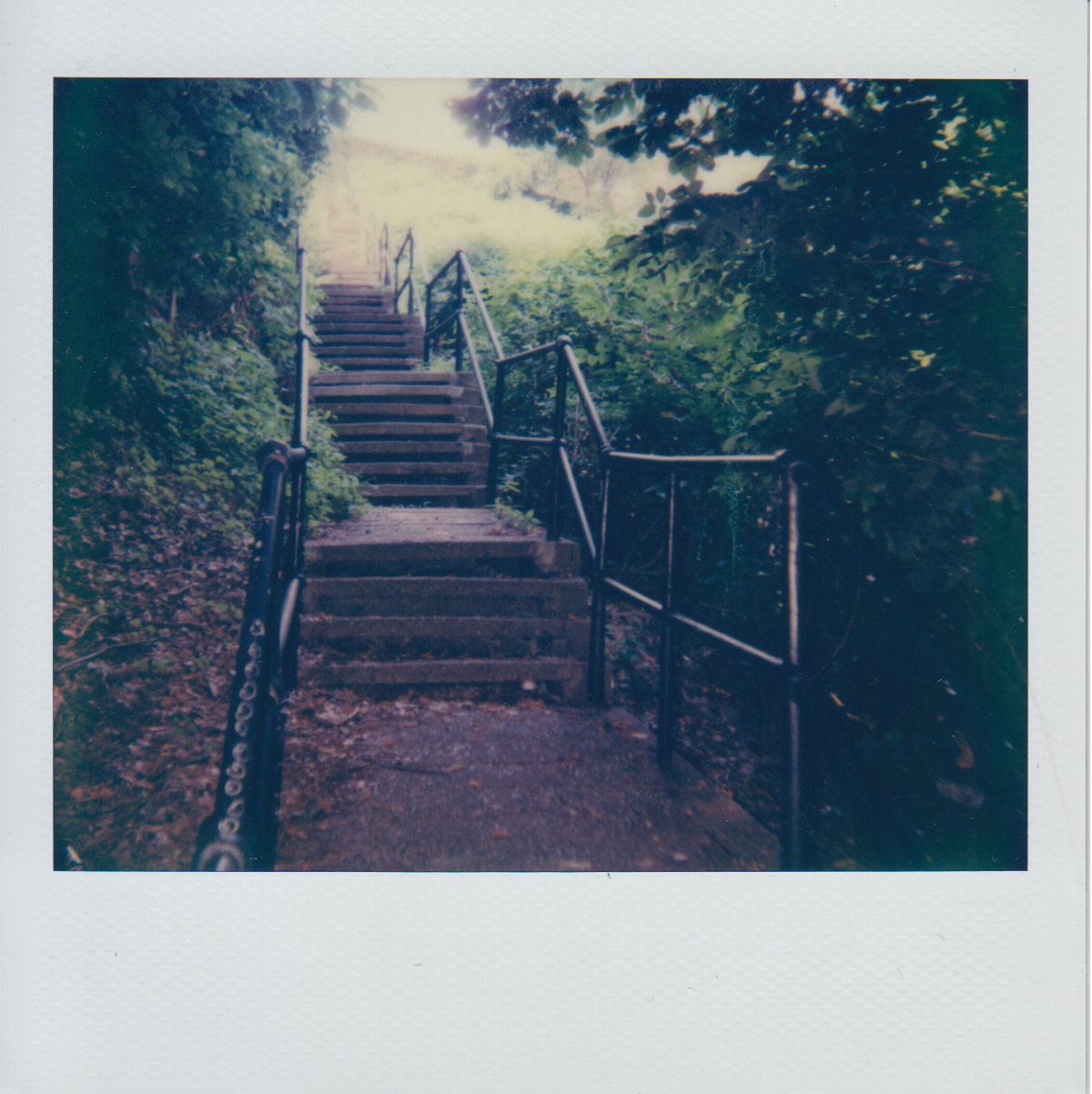
The city steps connecting Greenfield Avenue to Blanton Street in Greenfield

== Points of interest ==
Greenfield contains two small business districts along Greenfield Avenue and Murray Avenue. A major travel route is along Beechwood Boulevard, connecting I-376 to the Waterfront shopping district in Homestead. As a predominantly residential neighborhood, Greenfield boasts three baseball fields, four basketball courts, two hockey rinks, two soccer fields, and a swimming pool. It is also home to seven churches and one synagogue; the largest is St. Rosalia, a Roman Catholic church. Greenfield is known among locals for very steep hills, a chaotic street grid off the main roads, and a preponderance of single lane 2-way streets, which does not usually lead to congestion as the neighborhood is not heavily traveled (excluding Murray and Greenfield Avenues and Beechwood Boulevard, which are all multi-lane streets).

Similar to other Pittsburgh neighborhoods, Greenfield hosts a holiday parade and fireworks every December. The fireworks, which are usually sponsored by Zambelli Fireworks, are shot off from Magee Field.

Spanning I-376 and connecting Greenfield to Oakland is the Beechwood Boulevard Bridge, known more popularly as the Greenfield Bridge. It was built in the 1920s and eventually demolished on December 28, 2015. It was replaced by a new bridge that became available for public use in October, 2017.

== Notable residents ==
- Bryan Bassett, American guitarist
- Marc Bulger, professional football player, Baltimore Ravens, St. Louis Rams, Atlanta Falcons, New Orleans Saints
- Richard Caliguiri, mayor of Pittsburgh, 1978–88
- George Otto Gey, propagated the HeLa cell line, credited with creating the roller drum, pioneer in filming cell division
- Gary Green, MLB player, San Diego Padres first-round pick, current manager of Lynchburg Hillcats)
- Larry Lucchino, MLB team president, Boston Red Sox
- Mike McCarthy, head coach, Dallas Cowboys, Green Bay Packers, Pittsburgh Steelers
- Regis Monahan, professional football player, Detroit Lions, Chicago Cardinals, Ohio State All-American
- Bob O'Connor, mayor of Pittsburgh, January 2006 – September 2006
- Steve Sandor, actor who grew up in "The Run" in lower Greenfield
- Don Schaefer, (NFL player, All-American, Notre Dame)
- Jimmy Smith ("Greenfield Jimmy"), professional baseball player
- Pittsburgh Slim, rapper

== See also ==
- List of Pittsburgh neighborhoods
- Four Mile Run
