= Four Mile Run (Pittsburgh) =

- Sub-neighborhood
- Location of Four Mile Run in Greenfield
- Coordinates: 40.42747°N 79.94726°W
- Country: United States
- State: Pennsylvania
- County: Allegheny County
- City: Pittsburgh
- Neighborhood: Greenfield (Pittsburgh)

Four Mile Run, also known as Ruska Dolina (Rusyn Valley), is a valley in the Greenfield section of Pittsburgh, Pennsylvania, United States. The small neighborhood formed around the growth of Pittsburgh's steel industry as Rusyn immigrants settled in the area for employment at the nearby steel mill in the Hazelwood neighborhood and formed St. John Chrysostom Byzantine Catholic Church.

Essentially, it is the southern portion of Junction Hollow that lies beneath the heavily-traveled Interstate 376, or Parkway East, which is elevated 85 feet (26 m) above "The Run" via the 1,060-foot (320 m) Four Mile Run Bridge. For Pittsburghers, it is a place driven over and seldom seen, although St. John Chrysostom Byzantine Catholic Church's golden-lit domes can be observed from the Parkway East (Interstate 376).

== The Run ==
"The Run" itself is reference for a stream—about four miles (6.4 km) above The Point—that empties there into the Monongahela River. The neighborhood is distinctive because of its severe geographic isolation from the rest of the city. Today the stream Four Mile Run is piped underneath the neighborhood to the Monongahela River.

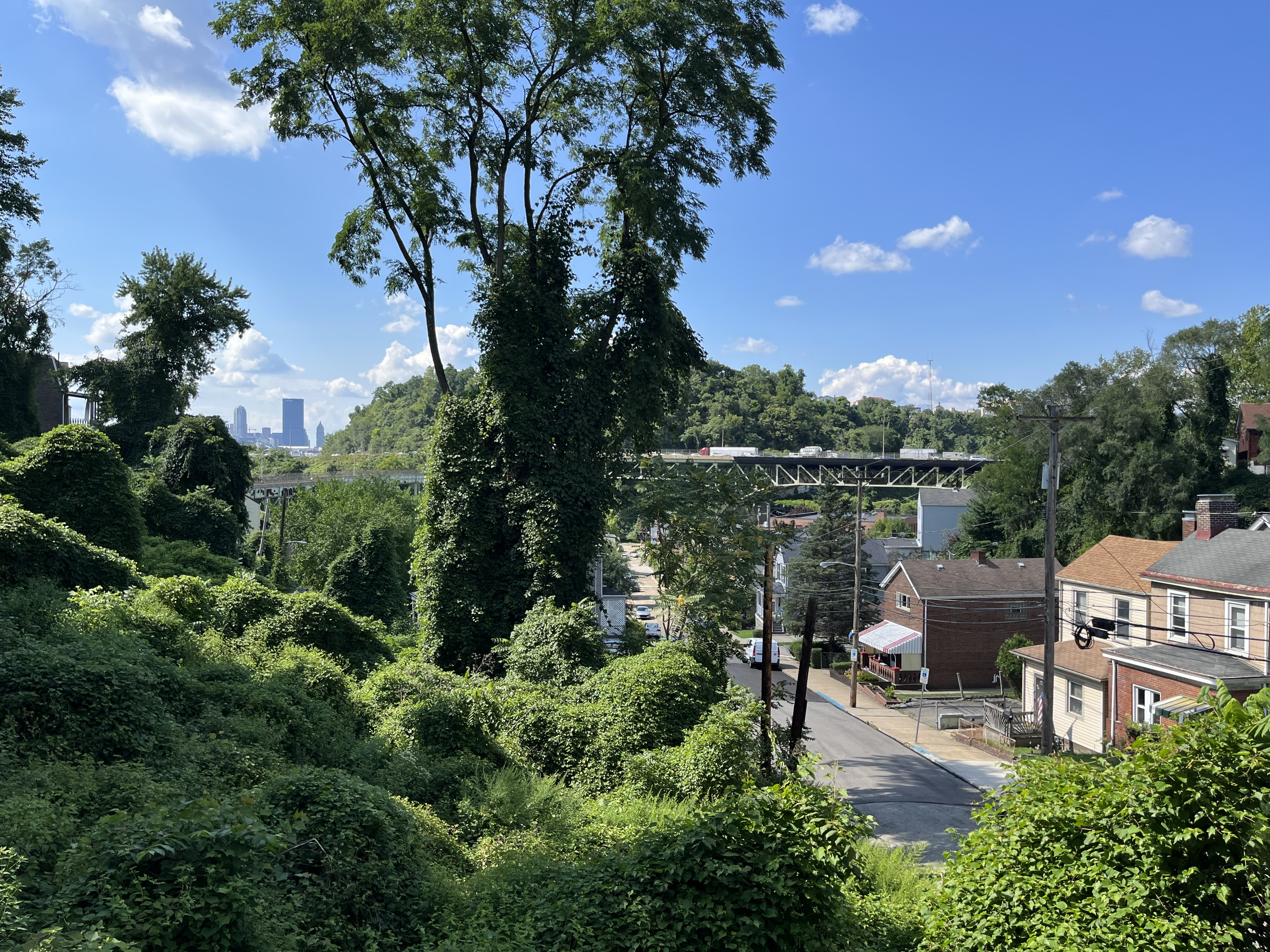
The neighborhood of Four Mile Run. The Pittsburgh skyline peeks through layers of verdure on the left. (Photographed August 2022)

== Ruska Dolina ==
In the early 20th century many Rusyn immigrants from the Carpathian Mountains settled in Four Mile Run. Most came to work in Pittsburgh's steel industry, and the neighborhood was adjacent to a large steel mill of the Jones and Laughlin Steel Company. Thus they called their community "Ruska Dolina", which translates as Rusyn Valley. In 1910 they established a church there, St. John Chrysostom Byzantine Catholic Church. The parish is famous today as the childhood place of worship for the Rusyn artist Andy Warhol and his family, who lived in nearby Oakland.

== See also ==
- List of Pittsburgh neighborhoods
