= Edward L. Woodruff =

American architect

- Born: October 8, 1851; Buffalo, New York
- Died: April 1, 1943 (aged 91); Flushing, New York
- Awards: Phebe Hobson Fowler Architectural Award

Edward Lowery Woodruff (October 8, 1851 – April 1, 1943) was born in Buffalo, New York on October and attended Columbia College, Washington, D.C. and Columbia University, New York, NY. He began his career as a civil engineer in the U.S. Lighthouse Service. Distinguishing himself early in his career as an award-winning lighthouse designer, he received a Phebe Hobson Fowler Architectural Award for his design of Angel's Gate Light in Los Angeles.

Woodruff started a private architectural practice in Staten Island and became a sought after specialist in country homes in Massachusetts, New Jersey, and Vermont. He designed two early developments and several estates in Sea Bright and Rumson.

His great grandfather Aaron Woodruff had been attorney general of New Jersey.

== Selected works ==
- Angel's Gate Light
- Blithewald Rumson, NJ
- Race Rock Light
- Stratford Shoal Light
- Stepping Stones Light
