= Los Angeles Harbor Light =

Lighthouse at the Port of Los Angeles in California, United States

Los Angeles Harbor Light San Pedro Harbor Angel's Gate
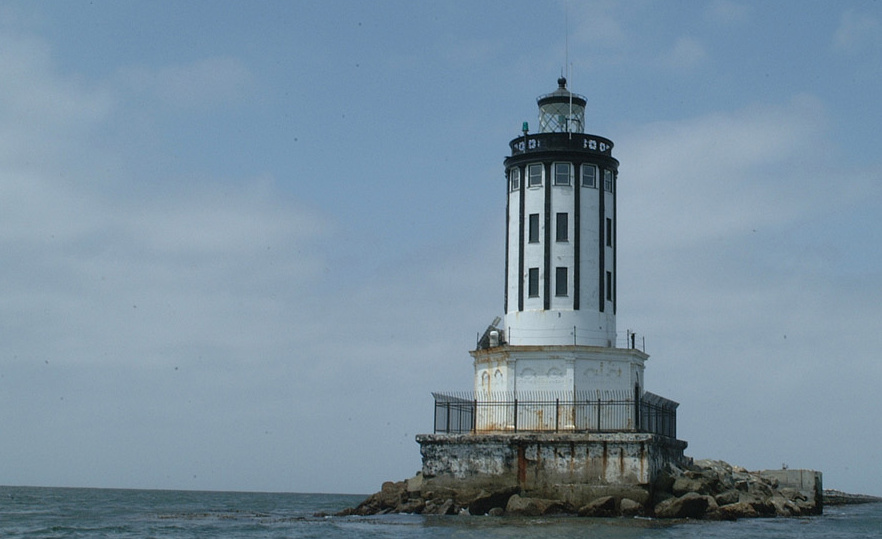
- Los Angeles Harbor Light
- Location: Los Angeles Harbor; California; United States
- Coordinates: 33.70857°N 118.25160°W

Tower
- Constructed: 1913
- Foundation: rock breakwater with concrete slab
- Construction: reinforced concrete tower
- Automated: 1973
- Height: 69 feet (21 m)
- Shape: cylindrical tower with balcony and lantern rising from an octagonal prism basement
- Markings: white tower with black narrows stripes, black lantern
- Power source: solar power
- Operator: United States Coast Guard
- Heritage: National Register of Historic Places listed place
- Fog signal: 2 blasts every 30s. continuously

Light
- Focal height: 73 feet (22 m)
- Lens: Fourth order Fresnel lens (original), DCB-24 aerobeacon (current)
- Intensity: 217,000 candela
- Range: 18 nautical miles (33 km; 21 mi)
- Characteristic: Fl G 15s.
- Los Angeles Harbor Light Station
- U.S. National Register of Historic Places
- Location: Los Angeles Harbor (San Pedro Breakwater), Los Angeles, California
- Architect: Edward L Woodruff
- NRHP reference No.: 80000810
- Added to NRHP: October 14, 1980

Los Angeles Harbor Light, also known as Angels Gate Light, is a lighthouse in California, United States, at San Pedro Breakwater in Los Angeles Harbor, California. The lighthouse is listed on the National Register of Historic Places. It is listed as Los Angeles Light in the USCG Lights list. It is one of few lighthouses in the United States that emits emerald green light; others include Portsmouth Harbor Light of New Hampshire and Newburyport Harbor Light of Massachusetts.

== History ==
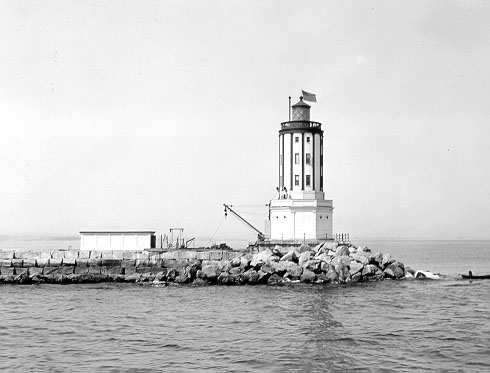
From the U.S. Coast Guard Archive

The original plan for the lighthouse was a wooden, square, two-story building like those constructed for Oakland Harbor and Southampton Shoals. However, the plans were changed and the Los Angeles Light was firmly anchored to the concrete block and built of steel reinforced concrete. It is the only lighthouse ever built to this design. The original paint on the lighthouse was only white, which caused a problem with seeing the lighthouse building during fog. Vertical black stripes were added for increased visibility.

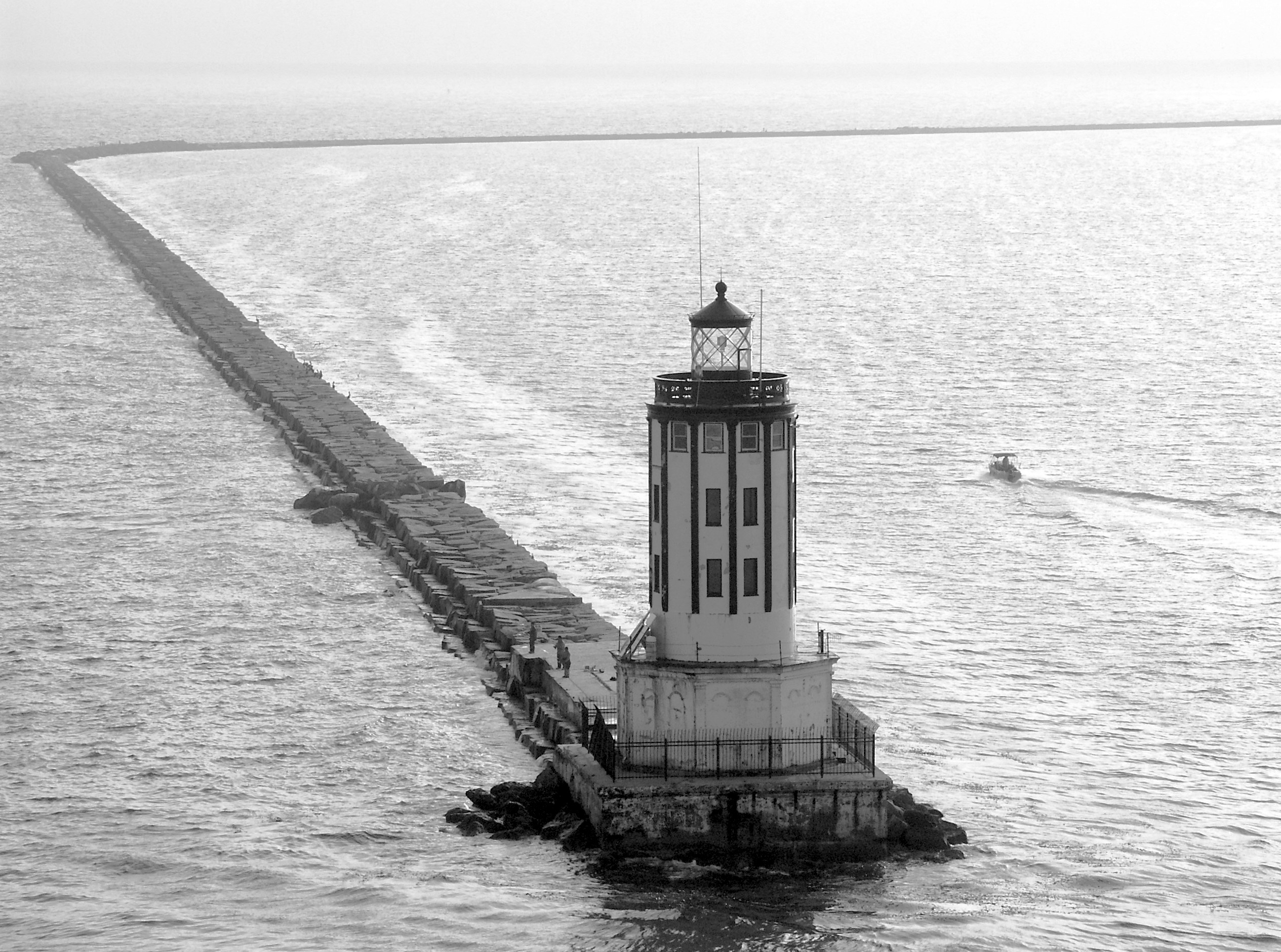
The lighthouse in 2006

By 2011, the years of exposure had led to rusted-through walls, broken windows, cracked masonry, and leaks during storms. In cooperation with the Coast Guard, the Cabrillo Beach Boosters Club completed a $1.8 million overhaul of the exterior, funded by the Port of Los Angeles. The overhaul was completed in May 2012. A $1.2 million overhaul of the interior is planned.

This lighthouse is inaccessible to the public, but can be viewed from the Cabrillo Beach area, San Pedro Breakwater or by boat.

== See also ==
- List of lighthouses in the United States
- List of Los Angeles Historic-Cultural Monuments in the Harbor area
- National Register of Historic Places listings in Los Angeles County, California
- San Pedro Bay (California)
