= San Pedro Bay (California) =

Bay near Los Angeles in California, United States

Coordinates: 33°44′00″N 118°12′03″W

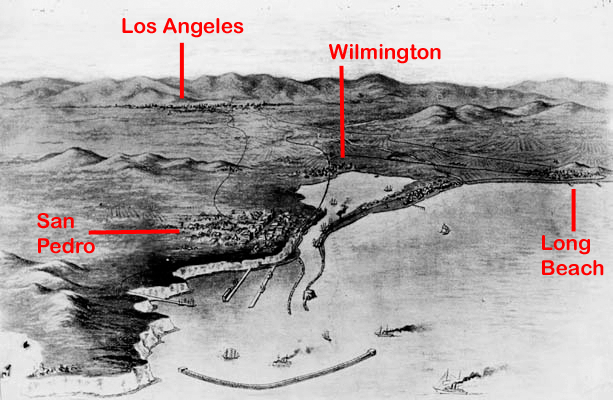
San Pedro Bay in a 1900 plan for the Los Angeles Harbor, present cities and districts are named

San Pedro Bay is an inlet on the Pacific Ocean coast of Southern California, United States. It is the site of the Port of Los Angeles and the Port of Long Beach, which together form the fifth-busiest port facility in the world (behind the ports of Shanghai, Singapore, Hong Kong, and Shenzhen) and the busiest in the Americas. The Los Angeles community of San Pedro borders a small portion of the western side of the bay. The city of Long Beach borders the port on the eastern side of the bay. The northern part of the bay, which is the largest part of the port, is bordered by the Los Angeles neighborhood of Wilmington.

== Seabed ==
Most of the bay is between 32 and 75 feet (10 and 23 m) deep. The seabed near Long Beach has experienced considerable subsidence as a result of oil extraction in the Wilmington Field from the 1950s onward. This helped the Port of Long Beach surpass the Port of Los Angeles as the leading port in the United States for a time in the 1980s and 1990s, since the deeper seafloor meant that Long Beach could accommodate ships with deeper drafts than could Los Angeles. Dredging operations related to the construction of a gigantic new marine terminal at the Port of Los Angeles have since made both sides of the bay accessible to even the largest existing container ships. Concerns regarding subsidence increased until Operation "Big Squirt", a water injection program, halted any progression of sinking land in 1960.

== Islands ==
Natural islands in San Pedro Bay include Terminal Island (actually an augmented mudflat and Rattlesnake Island), the site of much of Los Angeles' and Long Beach's port facilities, Mormon Island, the site of an abortive settlement attempt by San Bernardino-based Mormon pioneers in the 1850s, and Smith's Island. Land reclamation operations by Los Angeles have considerably enlarged Terminal Island, as well as linking Mormon Island to the mainland. Deadman's Island sat at a landmark at the foot of the bay, but was removed in 1928 as part of the effort by Phineas Banning and his successors to enlarge the harbor. In 1927 an airport, originally called Allen Field and later Naval Air Station Terminal Island, was built on San Pedro's Terminal Island.

Four small artificial islands containing oil wells (the THUMS Islands) are scattered around the bay near Long Beach. The oil drilling equipment itself is masked by tropical landscaping, architectural features and fake high-rise "buildings" in an attempt to improve their appearance from shore. These islands, named Oil Islands Freeman, Grissom, White, and Chaffee, are named for Theodore Freeman, the first NASA astronaut to die during flight, and for Gus Grissom, Ed White, and Roger B. Chaffee, who were killed by a fire during the Apollo 1 mission.

== Selection as harbor ==
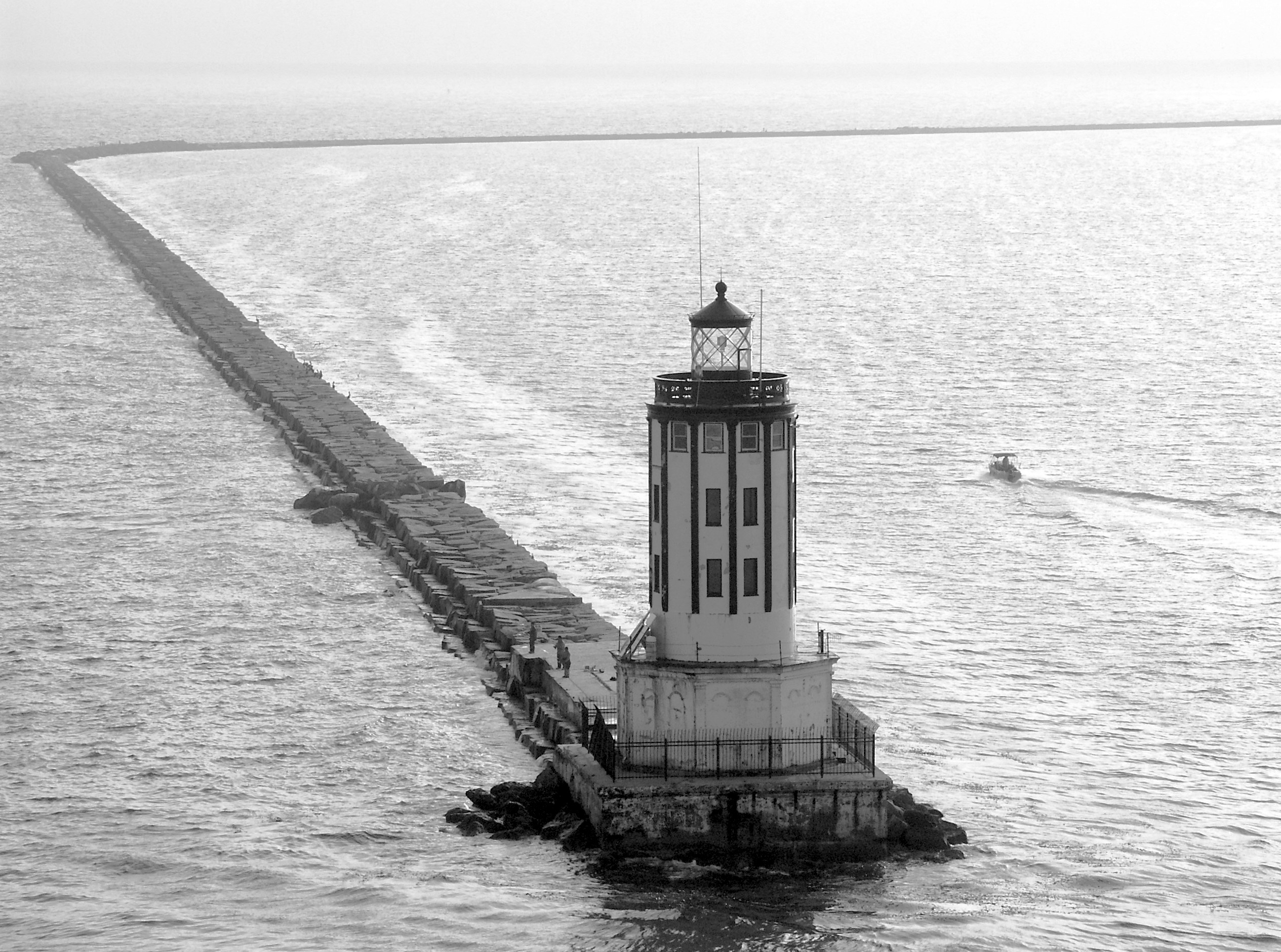
Los Angeles Harbor Light

As Los Angeles developed as an economic and trading hub, the need for a deep harbor became apparent. In the late 1890s, the Southern Pacific Railroad started purchasing large parcels of land in Santa Monica near its terminus, and the Huntington family advocated for a Santa Monica harbor, which would have monopolized Southern Pacific freight. In opposition, the Los Angeles Chamber of Commerce and a newly formed Harbor League advocated for a harbor to be built in San Pedro, where the Southern Pacific would have competition with Phineas Banning's Los Angeles and Harbor Railroad. The resulting Free Harbor Fight and 1906 annexation of the Harbor Gateway ensured Wilmington and San Pedro would serve as the main port of Los Angeles. It also explains the considerable distance between the harbor and the city's main rail yards, a situation not addressed until the construction of the Alameda Corridor nearly a century later.

== Breakwaters ==
Three breakwaters extend 8.5 miles (13.7 km) across most of the bay, with two openings to allow ships to enter the Port of Los Angeles and the Port of Long Beach. The first section of the San Pedro Breakwater was constructed between 1899 and 1911 at San Pedro. The Rivers and Harbors Act of 1930 authorized further construction. The middle breakwater began construction in 1932. The 2.5-mile eastern breakwater, also known as the Long Beach Breakwater, was constructed between 1941 and 1949.

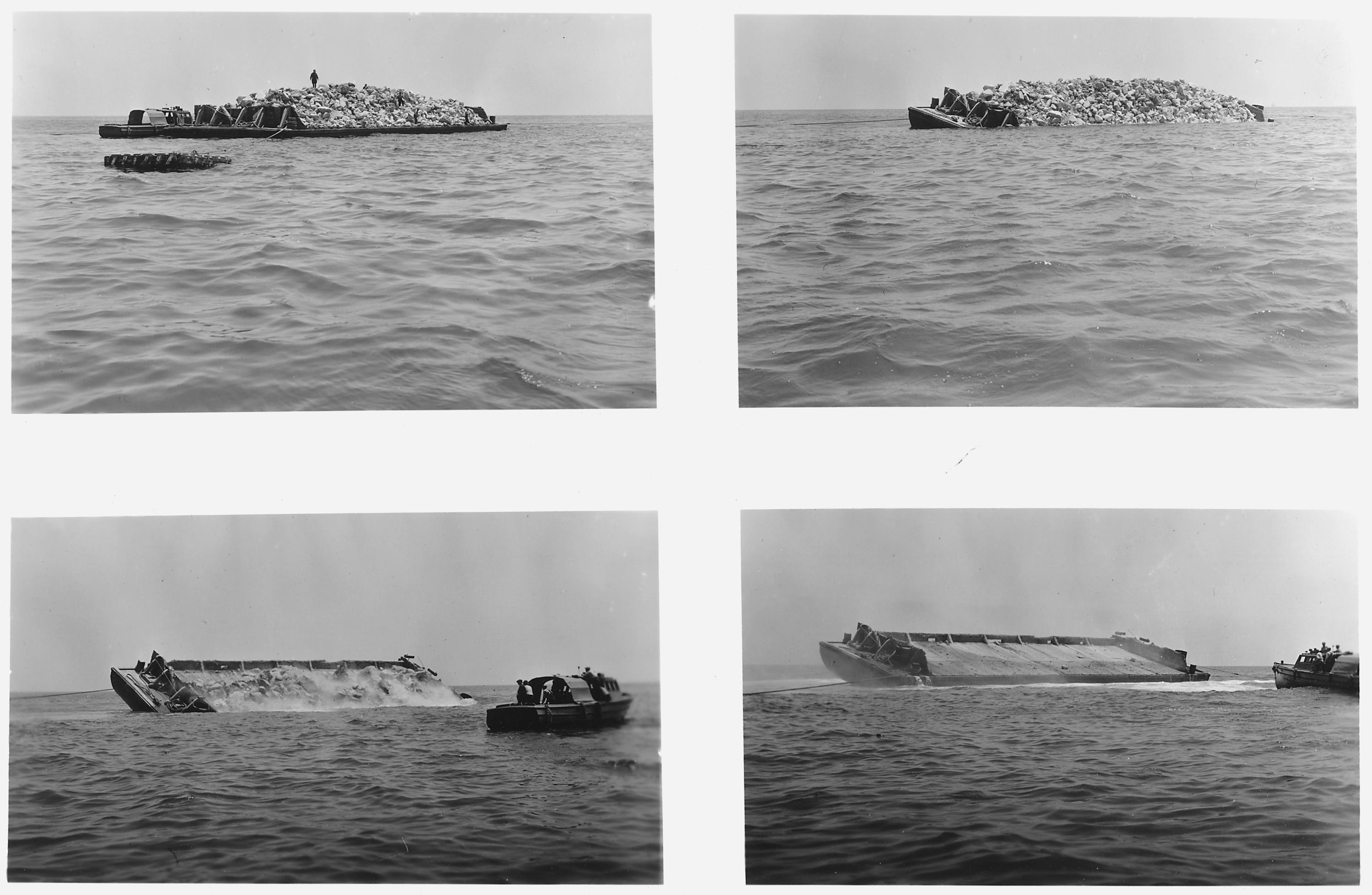
Building one of the breakwaters, 1937

The western and middle breakwaters provided the ports considerable protection in the 1939 California tropical storm. With the eastern breakwater not yet constructed, coastal neighborhoods of Long Beach such as Belmont Shore were severely impacted.

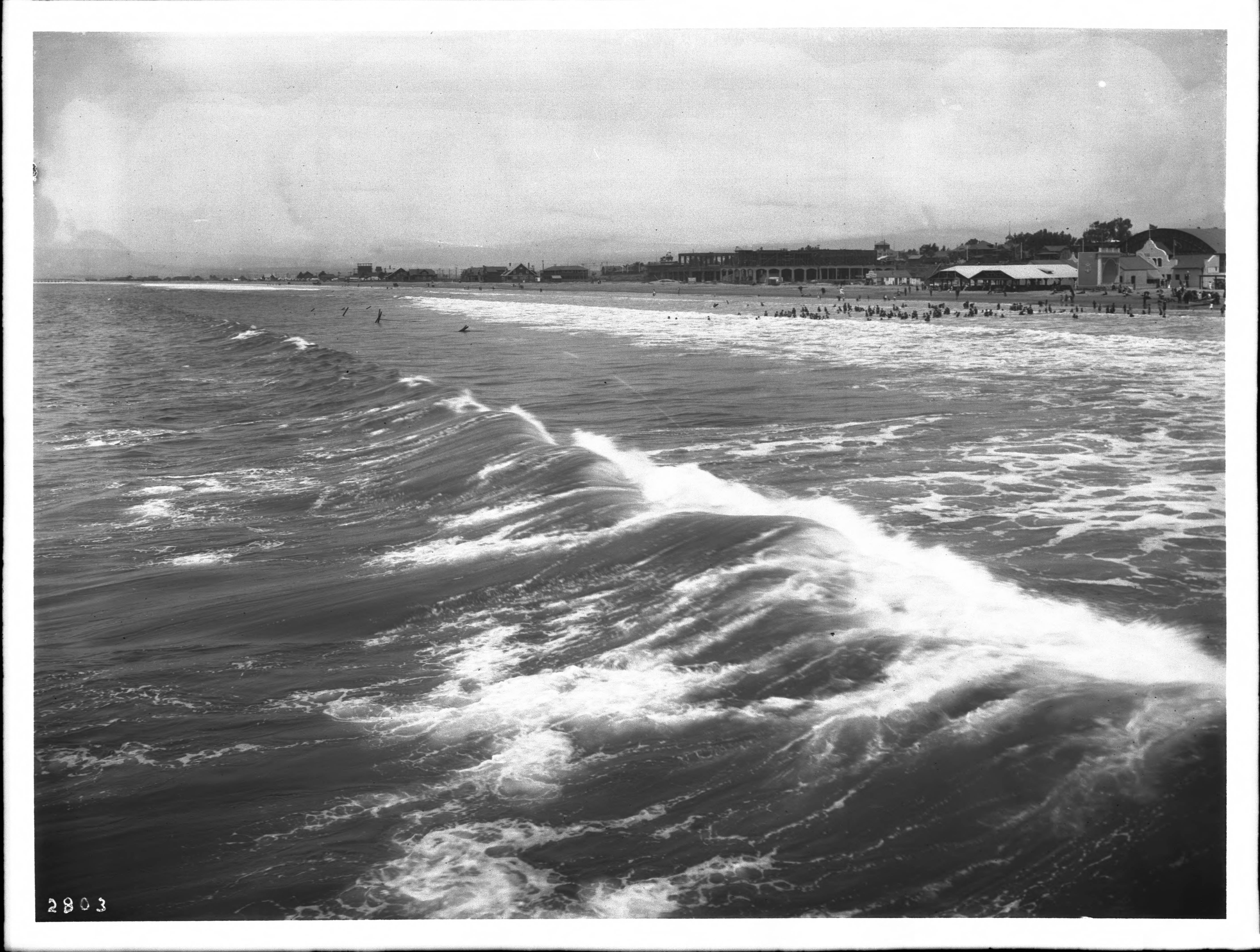
Waves at Long Beach, 1906

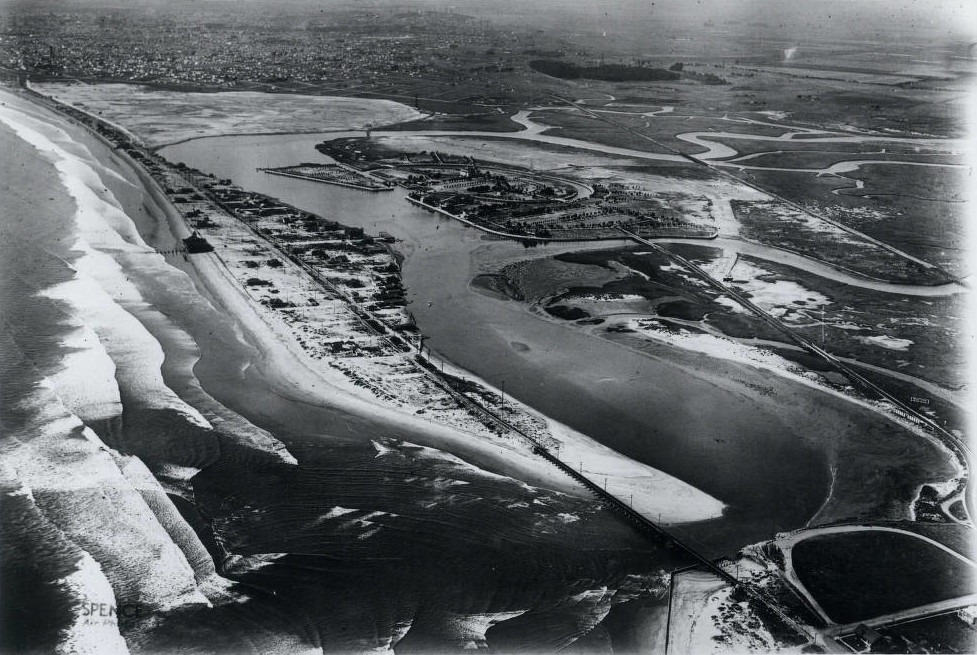
Waves at Peninsula, Long Beach, California, 1921, prior to the construction of the eastern breakwater

=== Restoration ===
The Long Beach breakwater is the target of controversy within the harbor towns and Greater Los Angeles conservationist community, with various environmental groups, including the Long Beach chapter of the Surfrider Foundation, proposing modifying or removing the breakwater to promote better water flows and a more natural coastal environment at the mouth of the Los Angeles River. This restoration ecology-based removal is opposed by waterfront property owners and shippers, who consider that the breakwater provides needed protection from storm damage.

A short documentary addressing the issues surrounding the reconfiguration of the Long Beach breakwater is available.

== In popular culture ==
British hard rock band Def Leppard who were inducted into the Rock and Roll Hall of Fame in 2019 make specific mention of San Pedro Bay in the song Hello America off their 1980 debut album, On Through the Night, singing "Well, I'm taking me a trip I'm going down to California. Yeah, I'm going to try Hollywood and San Pedro Bay" in the first verse. The Sheffield based band had not been to the United States yet when the song was written.

== See also ==
- Port of Los Angeles
- Terminal Island
- Long Wharf (Santa Monica)
- Los Angeles Harbor Light
- Long Beach Light
- Dominguez Channel
