= Vasile Aftenie =

Romanian bishop and martyr (1899–1950)

Blessed Vasile Aftenie
- Auxiliary Bishop of Făgăraș and Alba Iulia
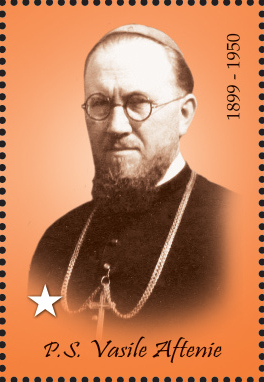
- Church: Romanian Greek Catholic Church
- Appointed: 12 April 1940
- Term ended: 10 May 1950

Orders
- Ordination: 1 January 1926 (Priest) by Vasile Suciu
- Consecration: 5 June 1940 (Bishop) by Alexandru Nicolescu

Personal details
- Born: 14 June 1899 Lodroman, Kis-Küküllő County, Austria-Hungary
- Died: 10 May 1950 (aged 50) Văcărești Prison, Bucharest, Romanian People's Republic

Sainthood
- Feast day: 10 May
- Beatified: 2 June 2019; Liberty Field, Blaj, Romania by Pope Francis

Vasile Aftenie (14 June 1899 – 10 May 1950) was a Romanian Auxiliary bishop of the Greek-Catholic Church, titular Bishop of Ulpiana, martyr of the faith and Servant of God of the Catholic Church.

He was beaten until his death in the communist regime's jails for refusing to abandon his Greek-Catholic faith and the United Romanian Church. Pope Francis personally presided over his beatification on 2 June 2019.

== Biography ==
=== Early life and education ===
Born in Lodroman village, Alba County, on 14 May 1899, from his parents Petru and Agafia, Aftenie began his primary studies in his native village and high school courses at Blaj. In 1917 he was drafted by the army and was in Galicia and Italy at the front. After the end of World War I in 1918, he began law school at the Faculty of Law of the University of Bucharest, but then decided in 1919 to enroll at the Academy of Theology of Blaj, and was later sent to Rome at the Greek College of the Saint Athanasius. He took a doctorate in philosophy and theology in 1925 and then returned to Romania.

=== Career ===
On 1 January 1926, Aftenie was ordained priest by Metropolitan Vasile Suciu. One month after he became a lecturer at the Theological Academy in Blaj. Soon afterward, Aftenie was named professor at the Blaj theological academy until 1934. From 1934 to 1937 he was archpriest in Bucharest and from 1937 to 1939 Aftenie was canon of the Blaj cathedral. On 1 October 1939, he became rector of the Blaj theological academy. On 12 April 1940, Aftenie was appointed bishop by Pope Pius XII, and on 5 June 1940 he was consecrated titular bishop of Ulpiana and Auxiliary bishop in the Blaj Cathedral, by metropolitan of Făgăraș and Alba Iulia Alexandru Nicolescu, and returned to Bucharest as vicar bishop at St. Basil's Church in Bucharest.

His co-consecrators were Alexandru Rusu, Bishop of Maramureș, and Ioan Bălan, Bishop of Lugoj. After the death of Archbishop Nicolescu on 15 June 1941, he became Apostolic Administrator of the Archdiocese of Făgăraș and Alba Iulia.

=== Arrest, torture and death ===
In 1948, the new Communist regime outlawed his church, and the authorities' efforts to compromise him failed.

In October 1948 Aftenie severely reprimanded the 36 former Greek-Catholic priests who had signed up for Orthodoxy and arrived from Cluj to the Patriarchate of Bucharest to bring their so-called adherence to the Romanian Orthodox Church, abandoning the Romanian Church United with Rome. The delegates from Cluj were at the Capșa Restaurant when Bishop Vasile Aftenie scolded them in public. More later, many of them have confessed that they were pressed to do it. Being a man of dialogue and sincere goodwill, therefore wrongly considered compliant by the regime, he was even offered, in exchange for his "conversion", to become Orthodox patriarch of Bucharest. He replied: "Neither my faith nor my nation is for sale".

Aftenie was arrested on 28 or 29 October 1948 in Piața Romană, just after leaving St. Basil's Church, and taken, together with the other five Greek-Catholic bishops, to Dragoslavele and from February 1949 to Căldărușani Monastery, which had been refashioned into a prison.

On 10 May 1949 he was taken to the Interior Ministry, held in isolation and tortured on the orders of General Alexandru Nicolschi, a Securitate senior officer. Mutilated, disabled, mentally broken but steadfast in faith he was thrown into Văcărești Prison, where he died on 10 May 1950. It is also reported that he was shot by a Securitate officer. Because he was very tall and did not fit in the wooden box (used instead of the coffin) in which he was seated, his legs were cut and fitted. Initially, authorities ordered the body to be burned, but Aftenie was buried at Bellu Cemetery, following a service held by a Roman Catholic priest from the Bucharest Bărăția and he conducted the rites in secret several days after Aftenie was buried by night under the eyes of the Securitate secret police.

Another priest brought a cross permitted by the communist authorities at his grave with his initials and the year of his death several days after that written: "VA = 1950".

In 1990, a white marble tombstone with a picture of the bishop was erected for him; his grave became a place of pilgrimage and is adorned with candles and flowers, he is called for help and assistance.

=== Beatification ===
Soon after, his tomb became a place of pilgrimage. Thousands of people come and pray to his grave. It is said that wonders happened here, to the prayers of the pilgrims, in response from God.

The cause for the beatification and canonization of Vasile Aftenie and 6 other Romanian bishops began on 28 January 1997. The diocesan inquiry is closed in 2010 and sent to Rome for study by the Congregation for the Causes of Saints.

Since each bishop has the right to be buried in the church he served, the bones of Bishop Vasile Aftenie were exhumed in 2010, and his remains taken from Bellu cemetery to a Greek-Catholic church in Bucharest for storage on 13 May 2010, a request for his beatification having been submitted the year before.

On 19 March 2019 Pope Francis approved the beatification of Aftenie and six other Greek-Catholic martyr bishops killed by the communist regime in Romania in the mid-20th century. On 25 March it was announced that Pope Francis himself would beatify Aftenie and the other six bishops on 2 June 2019 at Blaj's Liberty Field. He was beatified with the other six Bishops on that day in Blaj's Liberty Field.

== See also ==
- Saint Basil the Great Cathedral, Bucharest

== Bibliography ==
- Sergiu Grossu, Le calvaire de la Roumanie Chrétienne, Éditions France-Empire, Paris, 1987 ISBN 978-2704805280.
- Biography on the canonization of the bishops Valeriu Traian Frenţiu, Iuliu Hossu, Alexandru Rusu, Ioan Bălan, Ioan Suciu, Tit Liviu Chinezu and Vasile Aftenie
- Mihaela Olău: Episcop Vasile Aftenie. Editura Galaxia Gutenberg, 2012, ISBN 978-973-141-461-4.
