= Saint Basil the Great Cathedral, Bucharest =

Romanian Greek-Catholic church

Coordinates: 44.4496°N 26.1038°E

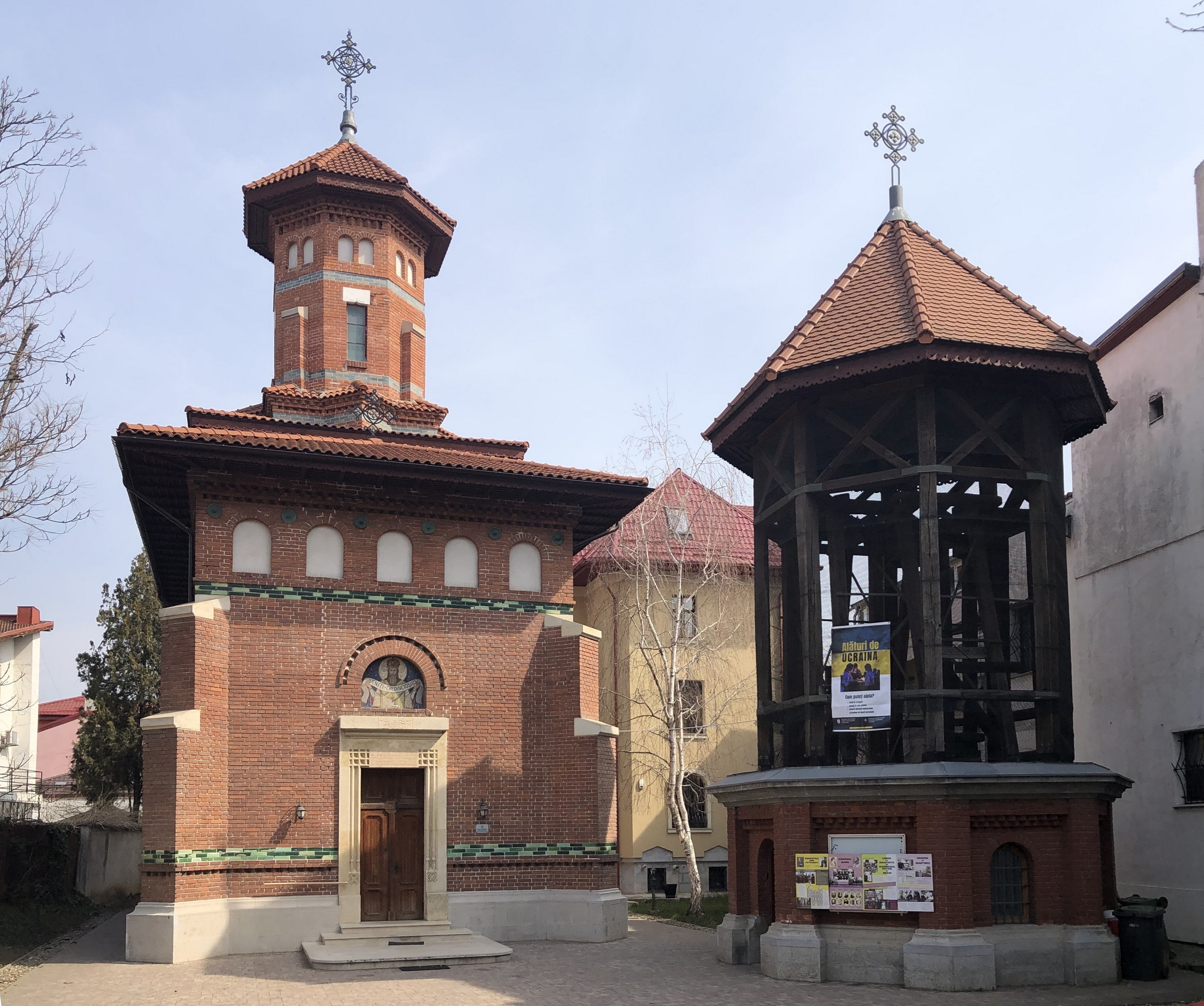
Saint Basil the Great Cathedral

Saint Basil the Great Cathedral is a Romanian Greek-Catholic church in Bucharest that serves as the cathedral of the Romanian Catholic Eparchy of Bucharest. It is located at 50 Polonă Street. The church's patron is Basil of Caesarea and its dedication anniversary is celebrated on January 1. On August 30, 2014, the church hosted the ceremony of inauguration for the first bishop of the Eparchy of Saint Basil.

== History ==
A Greek-Catholic community is attested even before the year 1800, when this group was initially composed of Transylvanian Romanians established in the Wallachian capital. Saint Basil exists as a legal entity since 1829 but it was not a place of worship being used as Roman Catholic Chapel at Călărași Street. In 1893, during the pastoral care of the future bishop Demetriu Radu, then pastor of the church in Bucharest, was purchased land at 194 Polonă Street (currently number 50), for the construction of a church. The acquisition was made on behalf of the Roman Catholic Church, as the authorities did not want the Romanian Church United with Rome, Greek Catholic to own property in the Romanian Old Kingdom.

After they were late to get the authorization of the construction of the church, the authorities imposed conditions for the construction of the church, such that it would be built in the courtyard (to be less visible to passers-by). This is why the church was built at a distance of 30 metres (98 feet) from the street. The financing of the construction of the church was made by the Greek Catholic faithful in Bucharest, the Greek Catholic Archdiocese of Făgăraș and Alba Iulia and the Latin Catholic Archdiocese of Bucharest. A significant amount (100,000 Austro-Hungarian krone) was donated to the former parish priest, Demetriu Radu, who later became bishop of the Greek Catholic diocese of Oradea Mare.

In 1909, in the feast of Saints Constantine and Helena (21 May), Roman Catholic Archbishop Raymund Netzhammer sanctified the place cornerstone of the church, assisted by the pastor of the Romanian Church with Rome in Bucharest, Ioan Bălan future bishop and prince Vladimir Ghika. After only seven months, on Saint Nicholas feast (December 6), Archbishop Netzhammer, under whose jurisdiction were Greek Catholics in Bucharest, consecrated the church built by architect Nicolae Ghica-Budești. It was used as a model church of Saint George in Baia, attributed to Stephen III of Moldova.

After World War I, with the establishment of the Deanery of Bucharest at Romanian Kingdom, Saint Basil Church came under the jurisdiction of the Greek Catholic Archdiocese of Făgăraș and Alba Iulia as residence of the archdeaconate. In 1940, the year of establishment of the Vicariate for Bucharest and the Old Kingdom, the church was elevated to cathedral. Here Bishop Vasile Aftenie worked until his arrest by the Securitate on 28 October 1948, when the church was occupied by an Orthodox parish. Aftenie was removed from the church, arrested, and beaten to death in Securitate cells in Bucharest. Also on the night of October 28 to 29, 1948 was removed from the parish house and arrested Tit Liviu Chinezu, Dean of Bucharest.

After these arrests other three priests united in Bucharest were appointed to take over the Vicariate, Natanail Munteanu, Gheorghe Radu, and Vasile Mare, whom remained illegal in Bucharest till the election of the historian and priest Zenovie Pâclișanu, member of the Romanian Academy, to take over the Vicarage. Pâclișanu was arrested in 1949 and died after nine years in Jilava Prison.

Immediately after the Romanian Revolution in December 1989, the Greek Catholic parish Saint Basil the Great in Bucharest reopened while asked its church restitution. Orthodox hierarchs initially promised return it, but they were encouraged by the state authorities do not recognize the right of believers joined the church of Saint Basil and changed their position and are no longer recognizable their promise although there are six Orthodox churches a short distance from the church of Saint Basil the Great.

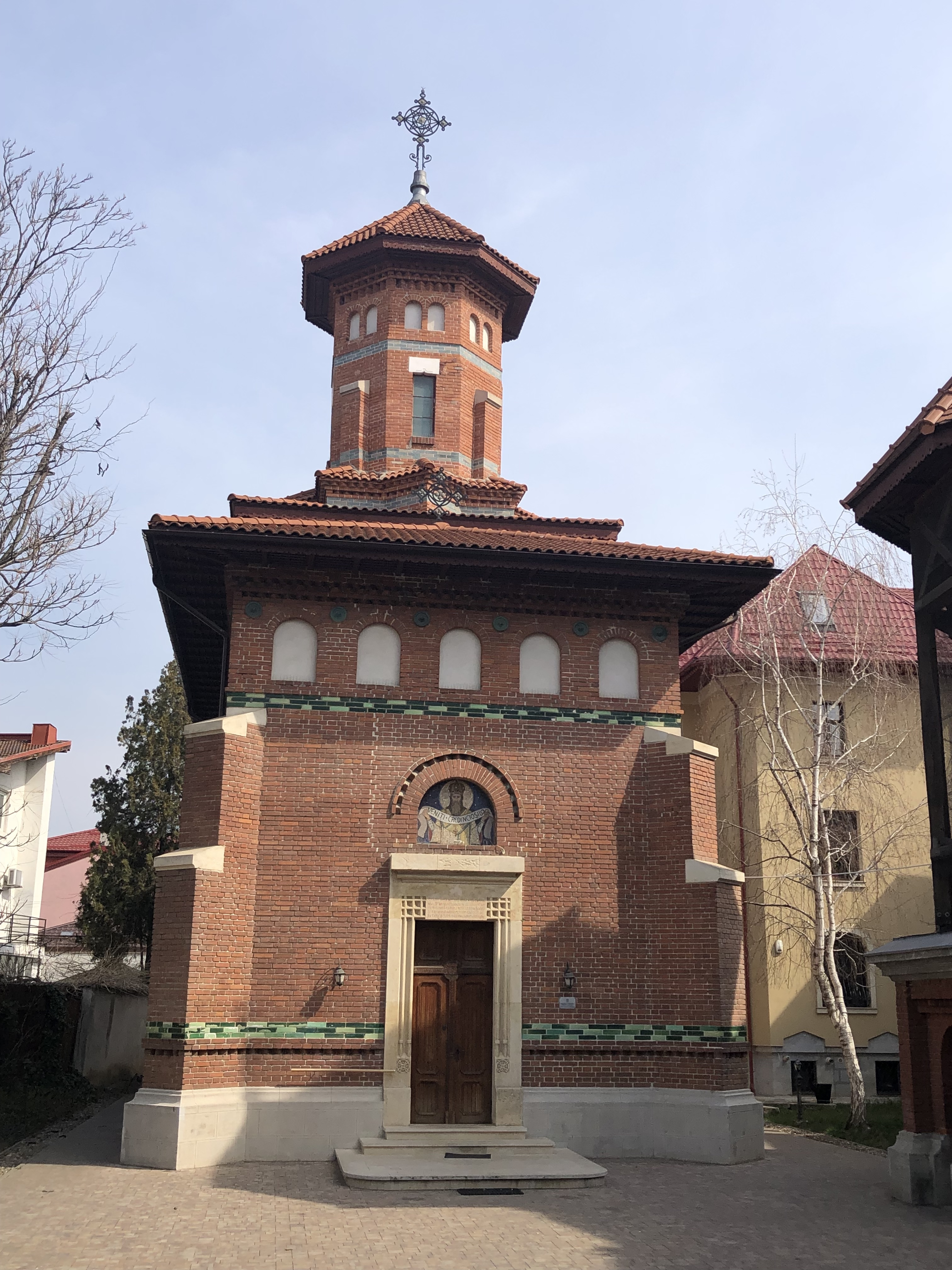
The cathedral

On June 2, 2005, in a meeting with the Prime Minister Călin Popescu-Tăriceanu, Patriarch of the Romanian Orthodox Church Teoctist Arăpașu reaffirmed its intention to return the Church of Saint Basil to their rightful owner. But the promise was not put into practice immediately, so that the recovery continued in the courts and was won after 14 years of trials of the Greek Catholic parish.

On 28 December 2006 Saint Basil the Great Church in Bucharest, back to the possession of the Romanian Church United with Rome, Greek Catholic but to an Orthodox priest was allowed to use the rectory until February 2007.

On May 4, 2008, in a ceremony attended by over 2,000 people, in the church was installed a new Greek Catholic bishop, now vicar of Bucharest, Mihai Frățilă, and the building was elevated to cathedral.

On 30 August 2014, was made a ceremony of inauguration of the first bishop of the Diocese of Saint Basil the Great of Bucharest, Mihai Frățilă. Holy and Divine Liturgy at the Saint Basil the Great Cathedral was presided by His Beatitude Cardinal Lucian Mureșan, Major Archbishop of the Romanian Church United with Rome, Greek Catholic, in the presence of Cardinal Leonardo Sandri, prefect of the Congregation for Oriental Churches in Rome.

== Personalities ==
The church of Saint Basil served over four times the Greek Catholic bishops. Its first bishop was Demetriu Radu, killed in a bomb attack staged by Communists in the Senate of Romania (on December 8, 1920), Vasile Aftenie, Tit Liviu Chinezu, and Ioan Bălan, all of them suppressed in communist prisons. Monsignor Vladimir Ghika served here in 1943. Among the literary figures belonging to this parish was George Coșbuc. The church was frequented during the interwar period by Greek Catholic politicians who served in the Romanian capital, such as Iuliu Maniu, his secretary Corneliu Coposu, Alexandru Vaida-Voevod, and others.

== Bibliography ==
- "Retrocedarea Bisericii Sf. Vasile cel Mare din București". România liberă (in Romanian). June 11, 2005.
- Horia Cosmovici, Monseniorul Vladimir Ghika, 25 decembrie 1873 – 17 mai 1954, capitolul Biserica din strada Polonă
