= Cristian Dumitru Crișan =

21st-century Romanian Catholic bishop

- Auxiliary Bishop of Făgăraș and Alba Iulia; Titular Bishop of Abula
- Church: Romanian Greek-Catholic Church
- Archdiocese: Făgăraș and Alba Iulia
- In office: 2020 –

Orders
- Ordination: 11 May 2008 by Mihai Frățilă
- Consecration: 21 June 2020 by Lucian Mureșan
- Rank: Bishop

Personal details
- Born: 11 October 1981 (age 44) Sântu, Mureș County, Romania
- Motto: Fidelis Est Qui Vocat Vos
- Coat of arms

Cristian Dumitru Crișan (born 11 October 1981) is a Romanian Greek Catholic hierarch as the Titular Bishop of Abula and Auxiliary bishop of Făgăraș and Alba Iulia since 2020.

== Life ==
Cristian Dumitru Crișan was born in the village of Sântu in Mureș County. He studied Theology at Blaj and took a bachelor's degree in Theology at the Pontifical Atheneum of St. Anselm in Rome. On 11 May 2008 he was ordained a priest of the Archdiocese of Alba-Iulia and Făgăraș.

He has a degree in canon law at the "Utriusque Iuris" Institute of the Pontifical Lateran University, and in 2012 he obtained his doctorate at the same university. Also in 2012 Crișan was appointed rector of the Greek Catholic mission in France, serving as the parish priest of the Romanian Catholic Church of Saint George in Paris. In 2013 he was appointed the notary of the Synod of Bishops of the Greek-Catholic Church in Romania. The following year in 2014 Crișan was appointed the defender of the connection in the Provincial Court of First Instance of the Archdiocese of Paris, and in 2016 he was appointed a judge of the same court. From 2016 to 2017 he attended the masters courses at the Faculty of Education Sciences of the Catholic Institute in Paris, obtaining his second master's degree in co-tutorship with the University of Paris IV (Sorbonne). A year later, he obtained the "Emouna - l'amphi des religions" Certificate at the Institute of Political Science in Paris.

On 9 April 2018, he was appointed by Pope Francis as the Apostolic Visitor for the Romanian Greek-Catholics in Western Europe, and on 11 October 2018, he was appointed National Coordinator for the pastorate of Romanian Greek-Catholics in Italy by the Italian Bishop's Conference. On 22 January 2020 he was confirmed by Pope Francis as the new auxiliary bishop of Făgăraș and Alba Iulia and titular bishop of Abula. At the age of 38 he became the youngest Catholic bishop in the world at the time. He was consecrated a bishop at the Cathedral of the Holy Trinity, Blaj by Cardinal Lucian Mureșan on 21 June 2020.

== See also ==
Catholic Church titles
New title	Apostolic Visitor for Romanian Greek-Catholics in the Western Europe; 2018–present	Succeeded by Incumbent
Preceded by Salvador Giménez Valls	Titular Bishop of Abula; 2020–present	Succeeded by Incumbent
