= Ioan Suciu =

Romanian bishop

Blessed Ioan Suciu
- Apostolic Administrator of Făgăraș and Alba Iulia
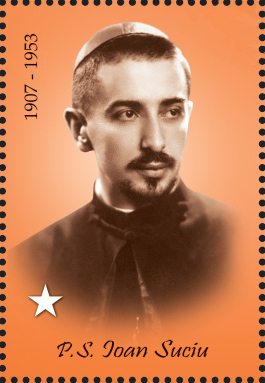
- Church: Romanian Greek Catholic Church
- Archdiocese: Făgăraș and Alba Iulia
- See: Făgăraș and Alba Iulia
- Appointed: 1947
- Term ended: 27 June 1953
- Predecessor: Valeriu Traian Frențiu
- Successor: Alexandru Todea
- Other post: Titular Bishop of Moglaena (1940-53)
- Previous post: Auxiliary Bishop of Oradea Mare (1940–47)

Orders
- Ordination: 29 November 1931
- Consecration: 22 July 1940 by Valeriu Traian Frențiu

Personal details
- Born: Ioan Suciu; December 4, 1907 Blaj, Romania
- Died: 27 June 1953 (aged 45) Sighet Prison, Sighetu Marmației, Maramureș, Romanian People's Republic
- Education: Pontifical University of Saint Thomas Aquinas

Sainthood
- Feast day: 23 June
- Venerated in: Romanian Greek Catholic Church; Roman Catholic Church
- Beatified: 2 June 2019; Câmpia Libertății, Blaj, Romania by Pope Francis
- Attributes: Episcopal attire

Ioan Suciu (December 4, 1907 – June 27, 1953) was a Romanian bishop of the Greek Catholic Church, born into a clerical family in Blaj.

Suciu studied in Rome, Italy first at Sant'Atanasio and then at the Pontificium Institutum Internationale Angelicum, the future Pontifical University of Saint Thomas Aquinas, Angelicum, where after six years of study he received a Doctorate in Sacred Theology on 29 November 1931, and was ordained to the priesthood. He was then consecrated Auxiliary Bishop of Oradea in 1940.

Arrested in 1948 under the new Communist regime that outlawed the Church, Suciu was taken first to Dragoslavele Monastery, then to Căldărușani Monastery. He was eventually sent to the notorious Sighet Prison, where he died of illness.

Streets are named after him in Oradea and Satu Mare. On June 2, 2019, Suciu and six other Romanian prelates were beatified by Pope Francis at Câmpia Libertății in Blaj.
