= Tit Liviu Chinezu =

Romanian bishop

Blessed Tit Liviu Chinezu
- Auxiliary Bishop of Făgăraș and Alba Iulia
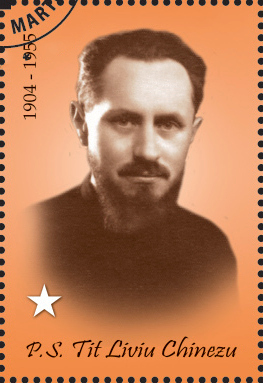
- Church: Romanian Greek Catholic Church
- Archdiocese: Făgăraș și Alba Iulia
- See: Făgăraș și Alba Iulia
- Appointed: November 1949
- Term ended: 15 January 1955
- Predecessor: Vasile Aftenie
- Successor: Virgil Bercea
- Other post: Titular Bishop of Regiana (1949–55)

Orders
- Ordination: 31 January 1930
- Consecration: 3 December 1949 by Valeriu Traian Frențiu

Personal details
- Born: Tit Liviu Chinezu; 22 June 1904 Huduc, Mureș County, Romania
- Died: 15 January 1955 (aged 50) Sighet Prison, Sighetu Marmației, Maramureș County, Romania
- Education: Pontifical University of Saint Thomas Aquinas

Sainthood
- Feast day: 2 June
- Venerated in: Romanian Greek Catholic Church; Roman Catholic Church
- Beatified: 2 June 2019; Câmpia Libertății, Blaj, Romania by Pope Francis
- Attributes: Episcopal attire

Tit Liviu Chinezu (22 June 1904 – 15 January 1955) was a Romanian bishop of the Greek-Catholic Church.

Born to a priest in Huduc village, Mureș County, he went to Rome in 1925, studying first at Sant'Atanasio college and becoming a Doctor of Sacred Theology at the Pontificium Institutum Internationale Angelicum, the future Pontifical University of Saint Thomas Aquinas, Angelicum in 1930. He was ordained to the priesthood on 31 January 1930.

Arrested in October 1948 by the authorities of the new Communist regime that outlawed the church, he was secretly ordained bishop in December 1949 by other detained bishops. Never tried or sentenced, he was eventually sent to Sighet Prison. He died there of hypothermia.

Pope Francis beatified him and six other Romanian bishop martyrs on 2 June 2019 in Blaj.
