= Romanian Catholic Eparchy of Bucharest =

Eastern Catholic eparchy in Romania

Eparchy of Saint Basil the Great of Bucharest Eparchia Sanctus Basilius Magnus Bucarestiensis Romenorum Eparhia Sfântul Vasile cel Mare de București
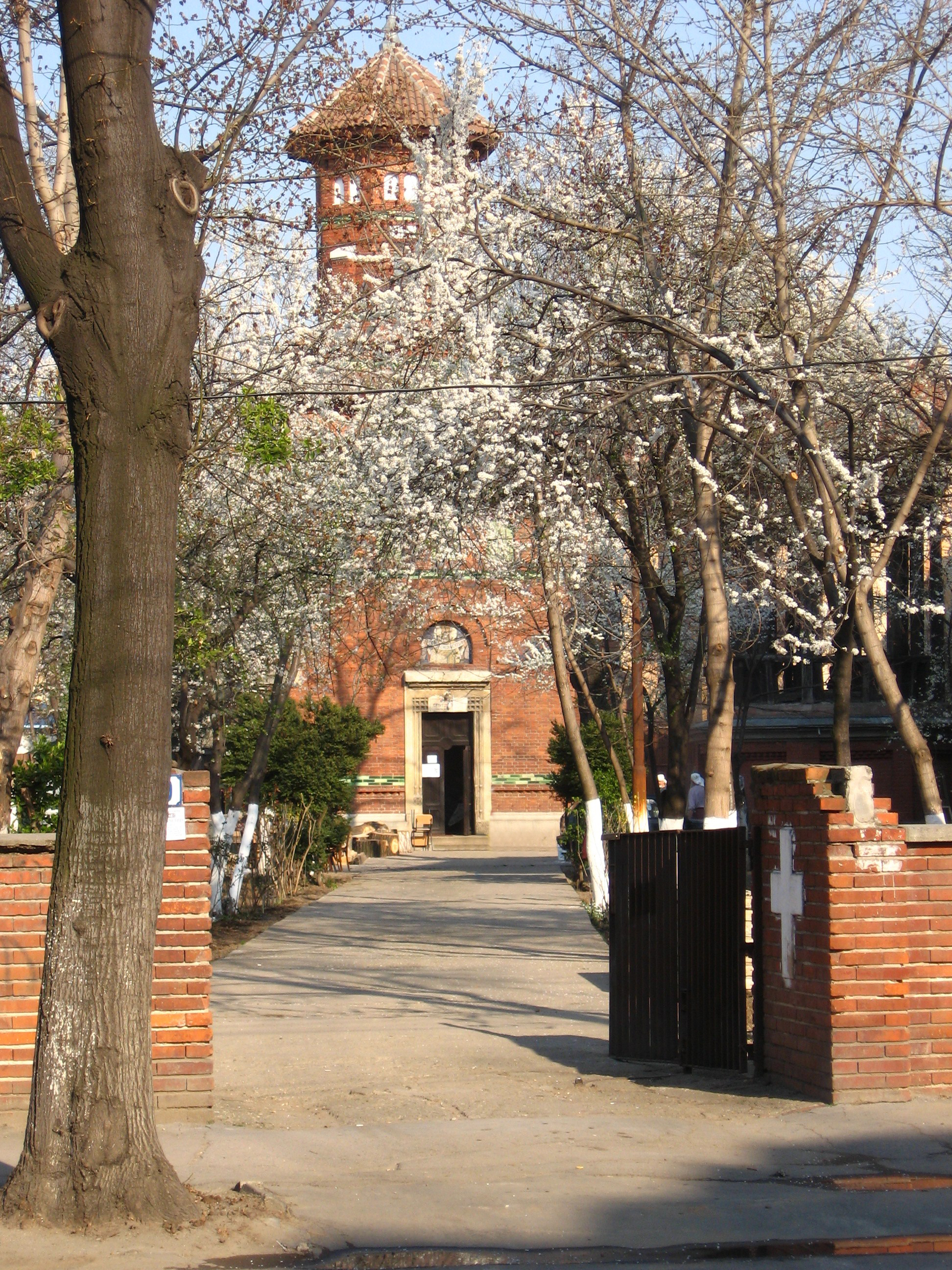
- Cathedral Saint Basil the Great

Location
- Country: Romania
- Ecclesiastical province: Făgăraş and Alba Iulia
- Metropolitan: Major Archeparchy of Făgăraş and Alba Iulia

Information
- Sui iuris church: Romanian Greek Catholic Church
- Rite: Byzantine
- Established: 29 May 2014
- Cathedral: Cathedral of Saint Basil the Great

Current leadership
- Pope: Leo XIV
- Major Archbishop: Sede Vacante
- Bishop: Mihai Frățilă

Map
- Church administrative divisions

The Romanian Catholic Eparchy of Saint Basil the Great of Bucharest (Romanian Sfântul Vasile cel Mare de București) is an eparchy (equivalent to a diocese in the Latin Church) of the Romanian Greek Catholic Church which is an Eastern Catholic particular church of the Catholic Church that is in full communion with the Holy See. Its uses the Byzantine Rite in the Romanian language in its liturgical services. It is a suffragan diocese of the Major Archeparchy of Făgăraș and Alba Iulia. The eparchy's cathedral church is the Cathedral of Saint Basil the Great which is situated in the city of Bucharest, Romania. The incumbent eparch is Mihai Frățilă.

== History ==
The eparchy was erected on 29 May 2014 by Major Archbishop Lucian Cardinal Mureșan on territory split off from the Romanian Catholic Archdiocese of Făgăraş and Alba Iulia with the consent of the synod of the Romanian Catholic Church and the Holy See.

== Geographic remit ==
The jurisdiction of the eparchy comprises all Greek Catholics of the Romanian Greek Catholic Church who reside in Bucharest and the historical regions of Dobruja, Muntenia and Oltenia. The territory was taken from the Archdiocese of Făgăraş and Alba Iulia.

== List of Eparchs ==
(all Byzantine Rite)

- Mihai Frățilă (29 May 2014 – ...), previously Titular Bishop of Novæ (2007.10.27 – 2014.05.29) & Auxiliary Bishop of Făgăraş şi Alba Iulia of the Romanians (Romania) (2007.10.27 – 2014.05.29)

== Sources and external links ==
- Official website
- Info on GigaCatholic
