= Vasile Suciu =

Vasile Suciu may refer to:

- Vasile Suciu (bishop) (1873–1935), Romanian Greek-Catholic metropolitan bishop
- Vasile Suciu (footballer) (1942–2013), Romanian footballer
