= Valeriu Traian Frențiu =

Romanian Greek Catholic bishop

Blessed Valeriu Traian Frențiu
- Bishop of Oradea Mare
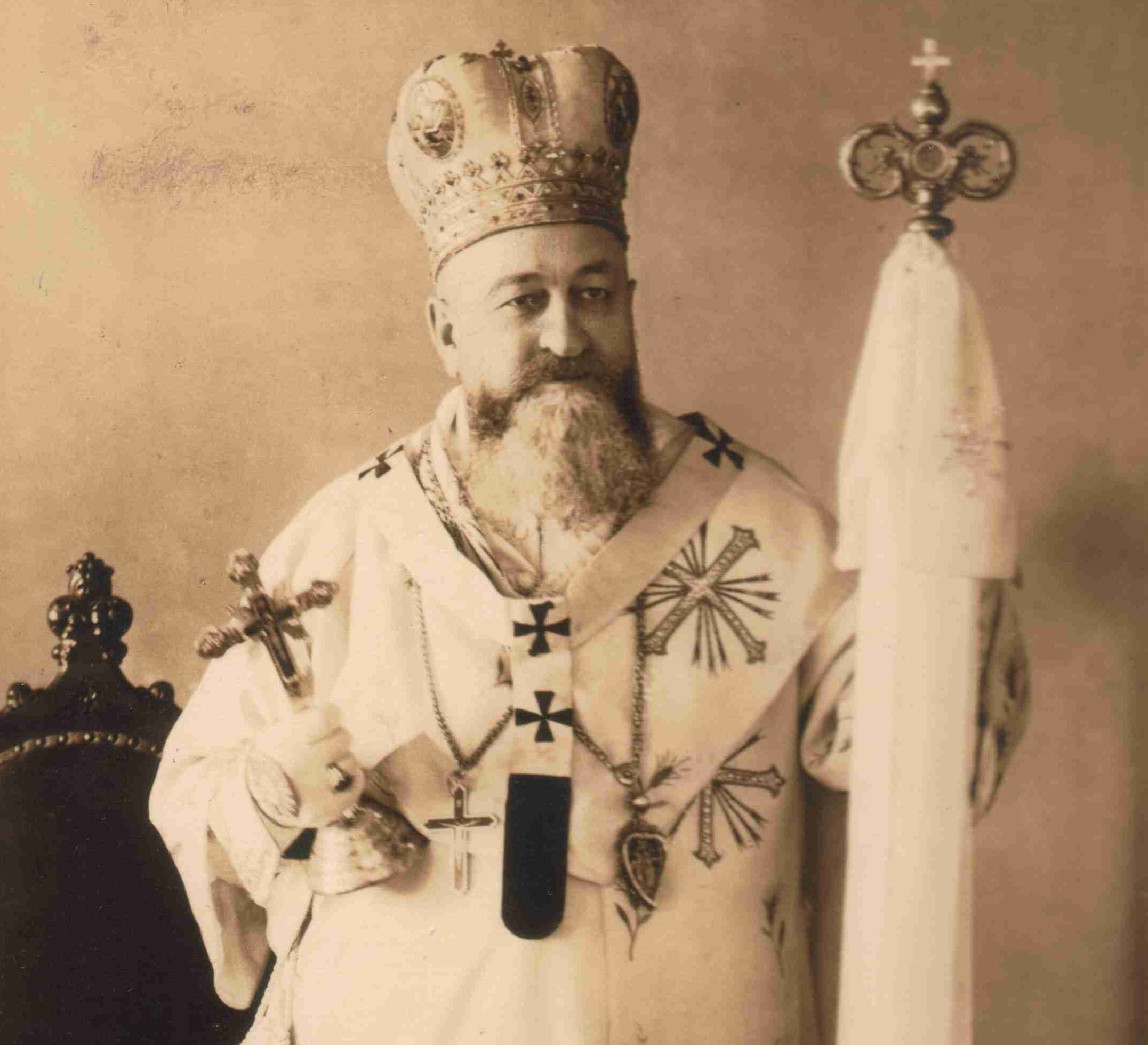
- Frențiu in 1937
- Church: Romanian Greek Catholic Church
- Diocese: Oradea Mare
- See: Oradea Mare
- Appointed: 25 February 1922
- Term ended: 11 July 1952
- Predecessor: Demetriu Radu
- Successor: Vasile Hossu
- Previous posts: Bishop of Lugoj (1912–22); Apostolic Administrator of Făgăraş şi Alba Iulia (1941–47)

Orders
- Ordination: 28 September 1898
- Consecration: 14 January 1913 by Victor Mihaly de Apşa

Personal details
- Born: 25 April 1875 Reșița, Romania
- Died: 11 July 1952 (aged 77) Sighet Prison, Sighetu Marmației, Maramureș, Romania
- Education: Eötvös Loránd University

Sainthood
- Feast day: 11 July
- Venerated in: Romanian Greek Catholic Church; Roman Catholic Church
- Beatified: 2 June 2019; Liberty Field, Blaj, Romania by Pope Francis
- Attributes: Episcopal attire

Valeriu Traian Frențiu (25 April 1875 – 11 July 1952) was the bishop of the Eparchy of Oradea Mare of the Romanian Greek Catholic Church between 1922 and 1952. He was beatified by Pope Francis in 2019. Frențiu is venerated on the 11th of July.

== Early life ==
Frențiu was born in Reșița to Ioachim and Rozalia Frențiu. His father, Ioachim, served as a parish administrator in Valea Lungă and later as a priest in Reșița.

Frențiu completed high school at "Saint Basil the Great" High School in Blaj and studied theology at the University of Budapest. He was ordained on 20 September 1898 after graduating. Soon after his graduation, he received a scholarship at the Augustineum in Vienna, where he remained until 1902, earning the title of Doctor of Theology.

Between 1902 and 1904, he served as a notary and diocesan archivist in Lugoj. Between 1904 and 1912, he served as a priest in Orăștie. In 1912, he was named Vicar of Hațeg.

== As bishop of Lugoj and Oradea ==
Greek Catholic bishops at the Coronation of Charles IV of Hungary, 1916. First row: István Miklósy, Antal Papp; third row: Valeriu Traian Frențiu, Demetriu Radu; last row: Julije Drohobeczky

On 4 November 1912, Frențiu was named bishop of the Eparchy of Lugoj. His consecration took place on 14 January 1913 at the Cathedral of the Holy Trinity in Blaj. Metropolitan Victor Mihaly de Apșa and bishops Demetriu Radu and Vasile Hossu were present.

On 25 February 1922, he was transferred to the Eparchy of Oradea Mare. Despite the loss of several properties during his episcopate, he oversaw the construction and renovation of several churches and parish houses between 1925 and 1939.

Frențiu went on visits ad limina in 1923 and 1925, during the latter of which he was joined by Iuliu Hossu and Alexandru Nicolescu, as well as a number of laypeople.

In 1926, as recognition for his activity, he was given the honorary title of Grand Officer of the Order of the Crown of Romania. On 15–16 June 1927, on the 150th anniversary of the Eparchy of Oradea Mare, Pope Pius XI accorded him the title of archbishop.

Frențiu sponsored the activity of local Christian periodicals "Vestitorul" and "Observatorul", published in Oradea and Beiuș, respectively. Frențiu also sought the promotion of the Oradea Theological Seminary to the rank of academy.

In 1937, Frențiu consecrated three churches, in Mădăras, Istrău and Bocșa.

Following the death of Metropolitan Alexandru Nicolescu in 1941, he was appointed to the Archdiocese of Alba Iulia and Făgăraș, where he remained until his return to the Eparchy of Oradea Mare in 1947. During his absence, he appointed Ioan Suciu to serve as bishop in his place.

== Imprisonment during the Communist regime ==
Frențiu was arrested without a trial by the Securitate on 28 October 1948 as part of the anti-religious campaign in Communist Romania. On 31 October 1948, he was transferred to Dragoslavele and held in a parish house used by the Communist authorities as a prison. He received several visits from Patriarch Justinian of Romania and then-bishop Teoctist Arăpașu. In 1949, he was moved to Căldărușani Monastery in Gruiu. On Christmas Day of the same year, within the monastery, Frențiu consecrated Ioan Cherteș as bishop.

Frențiu refused to convert to Eastern Orthodoxy, despite having been asked to do so repeatedly during this time.

== Death ==
In 1950, he was moved to Sighet Prison, where he died on 11 July 1952. He was buried at nighttime, without a coffin, and the grave was leveled. Communist authorities sought to keep the location of his burial a secret, in order to avoid potential pilgrimages to it.

The news of Frențiu's death spread throughout the prison during the next morning. According to the memoirs of Iuliu Hossu, Frențiu was mourned. He recounts: "they took part with all their spirit, as they have told me, through their messengers, whispering at my cell door; they took part in mourning, and held funerals in their heart."

== Beatification ==
On 19 March 2019, Pope Francis approved Frenţiu's beatification, along with six other bishops who died as a result of imprisonment in Communist Romania.

Pope Francis personally presided over the beatification of Frențiu and the other six bishops at Liberty Field in Blaj, Romania on 2 June 2019.

== Gallery ==
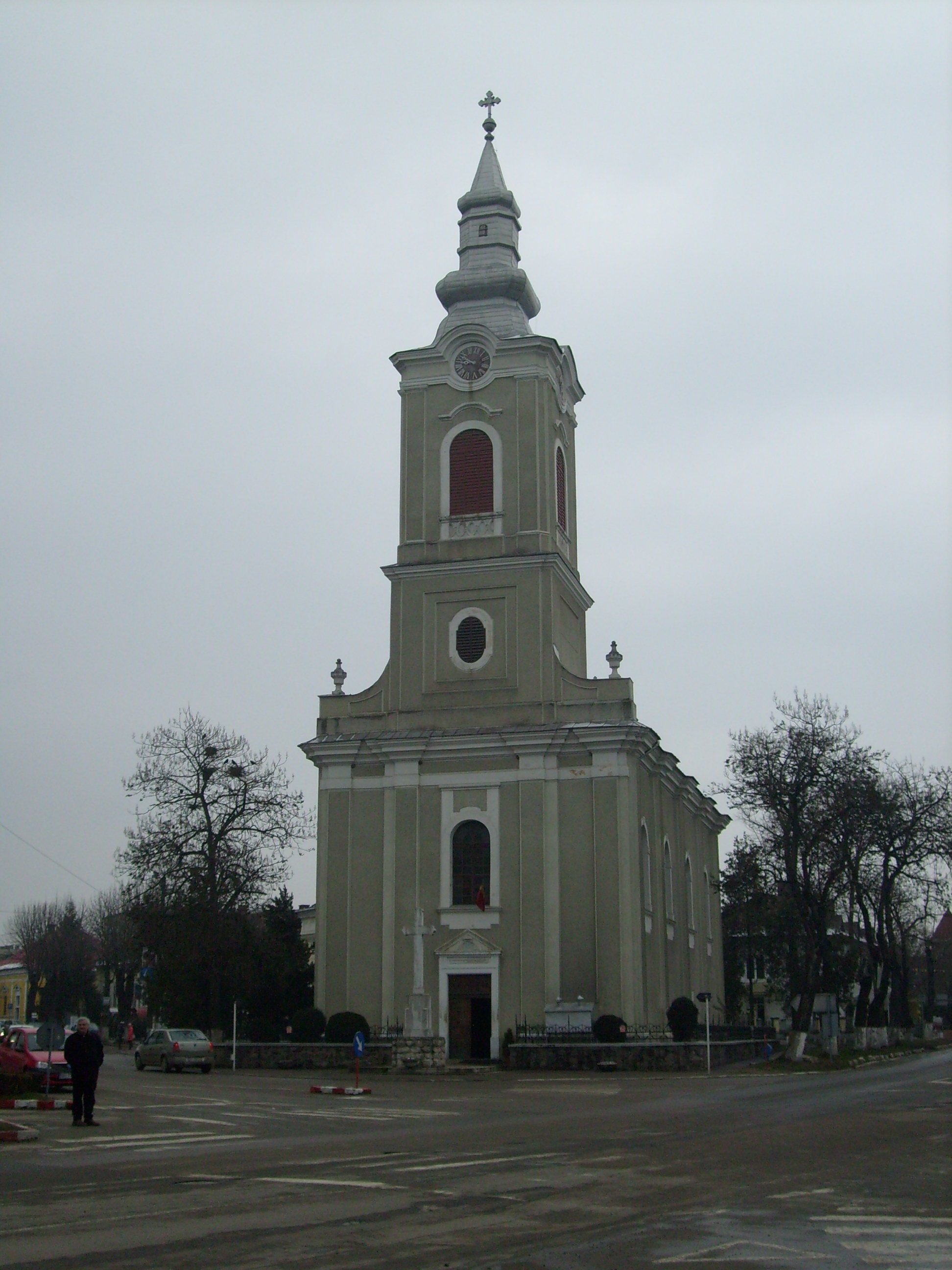
Church in Beiuș, renovated at Frenţiu's expense (currently owned by the Romanian Orthodox Church)

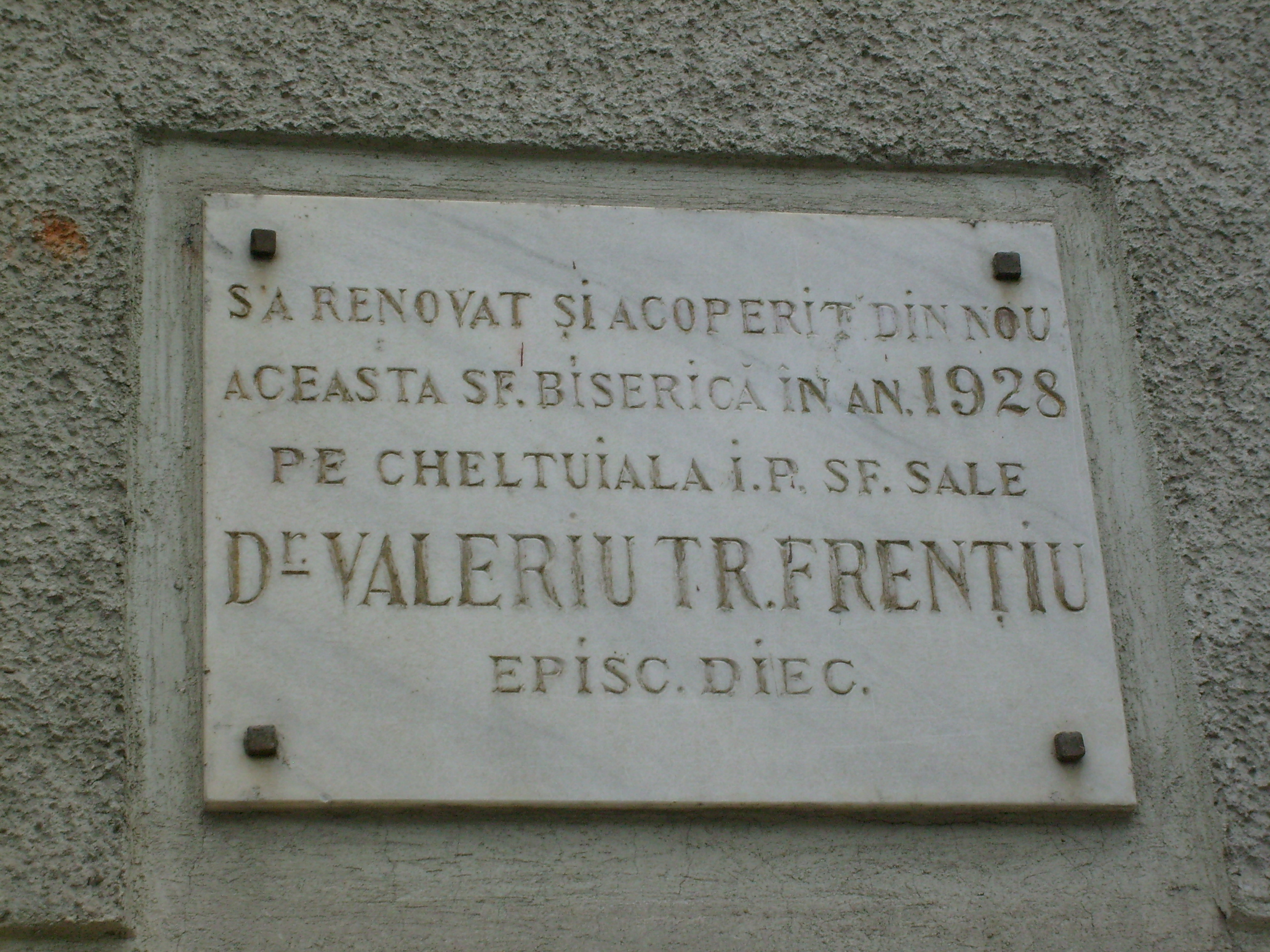
Memorial plaque in Beiuș

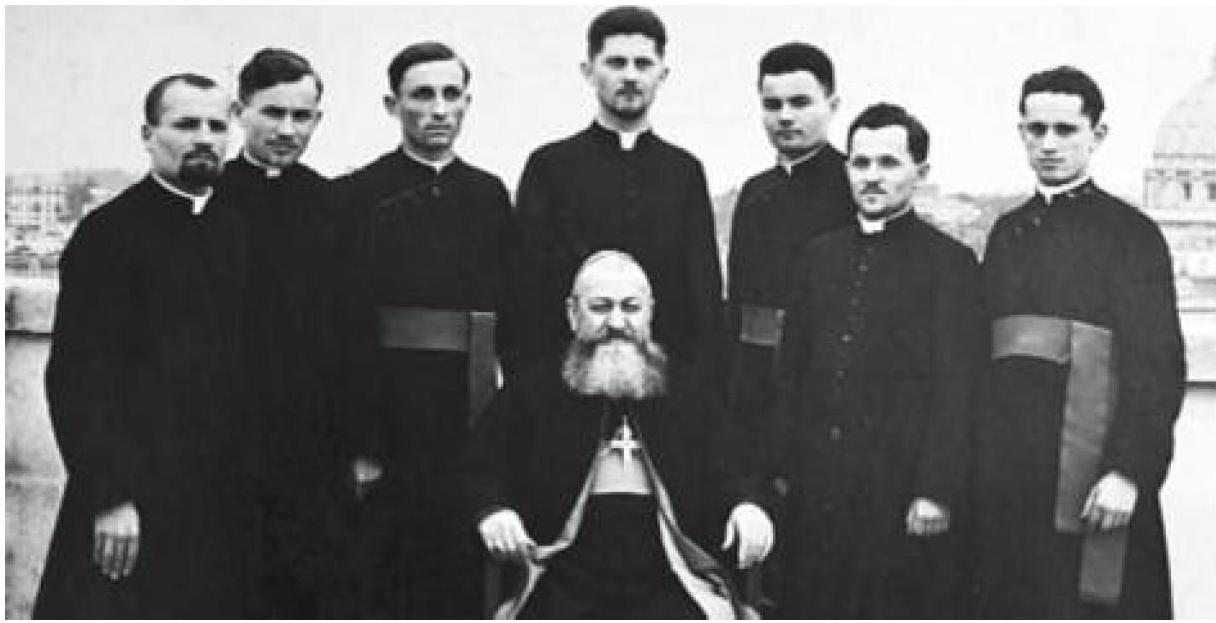
Frențiu with other priests (center, sitting).

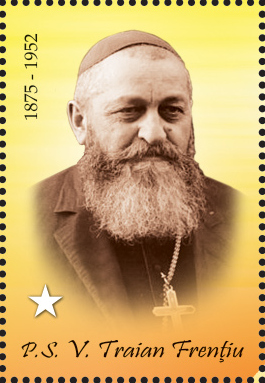
Frențiu on a 2019 Romanian stamp

== Bibliography ==
- Ioan M. Bota, Istoria Bisericii universale și a Bisericii românești de la origini până în zilele noastre, Casa de Editură „Viața Creștină”, Cluj-Napoca, 1994. ISBN 973-96661-5-9
- Ioan Ploscaru, Lanțuri și Teroare, Editura Signata, Timișoara, 1993, ISBN 973-551-028-6
