= Alexandru Todea =

Romanian Greek-Catholic bishop

His Eminence Alexandru Todea
- Cardinal, Archbishop of Făgăraș and Alba Iulia
- Church: Romanian Greek Catholic Church
- Archdiocese: Făgăraș and Alba Iulia
- Installed: 1990
- Term ended: 20 July 1993
- Predecessor: Alexandru Nicolescu
- Successor: Lucian Mureșan
- Other post: Cardinal-Priest of Sant'Atanasio a Via Tiburtina

Orders
- Ordination: 25 March 1939
- Consecration: 19 November 1950
- Created cardinal: 28 June 1991 by John Paul II
- Rank: Cardinal-Priest

Personal details
- Born: 5 June 1912 Marostelek, Austria-Hungary
- Died: 22 May 2002 (aged 89) Târgu Mureș, Romania
- Buried: Cathedral of Blaj
- Education: Pontificio Collegio Urbano de Propaganda Fide

Alexandru Todea (5 June 1912, Teleac, Mureș County–22 May 2002, Târgu Mureș) was a Romanian Greek-Catholic bishop of the Alba Iulia Diocese and later cardinal.

== Early life ==
Born into a peasant family, Todea was the 13th of 16 children. After attending primary school in his native village, and high school in Reghin and Blaj, Metropolitan bishop Vasile Suciu sent him to pursue his theological studies in Rome. He received his doctorate from the Pontificio Collegio Urbano de Propaganda Fide and returned to Romania in 1940.

He was also a victim of the communist regime, suffering at Jilava, Sighet, and Pitești prisons.

He was created cardinal on 28 June 1991 and given the titular church of Sant'Atanasio a Via Tiburtina.

== Health and death ==
In 1992, Cardinal Todea suffered a paralyzing stroke. He recovered, but was rendered unable to walk or talk for the rest of his life.

Todea is buried at the Cathedral of the Holy Trinity in Blaj.
