= Romanian Pontifical College =

Seminary for English and Welsh Catholic priests in Rome, Italy

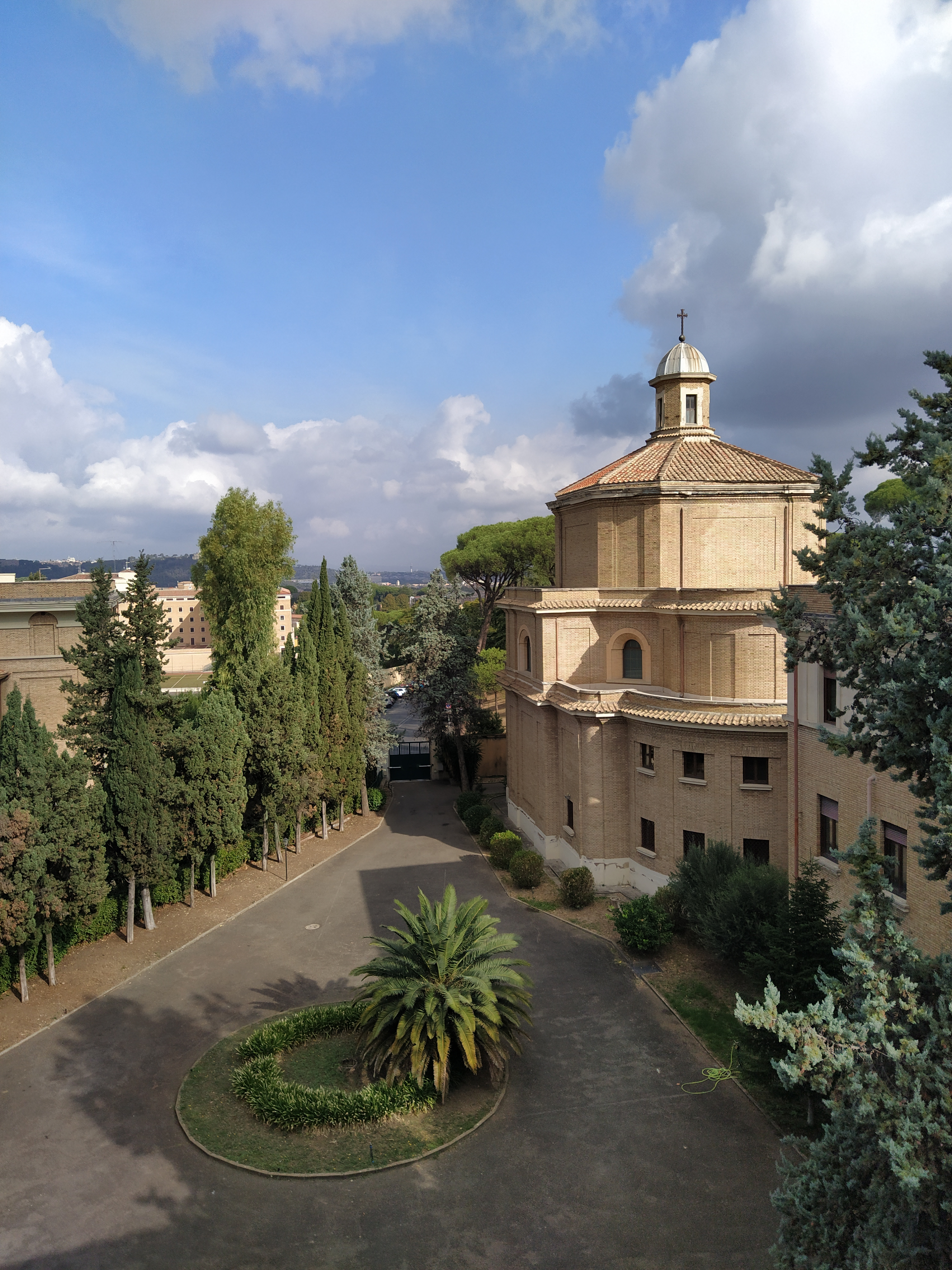
- Click on the map for a fullscreen view
- 41°53′39″N 12°27′36″E
- Location: Janiculum Hill, Rome
- Country: Italy (extraterritorial property of the Holy See)
- Denomination: Romanian Greek Catholic Church
- Website: pioromeno.com

History
- Founded: 9 March 1937
- Founder: Pope Pius XI
- Dedication: John of Damascus

Administration
- Archdiocese: Rome

The Romanian Pontifical College (Romanian: Colegiul Pontifical Pio Romeno) is a college established by Pope Pius XI for young people from the Romanian Greek Catholic Church who are in various phases of study at the universities of Rome, particularly post-graduates, and seminarians and priests, many of whom live in the college.

== History ==
Pope Pius IX established four scholarships for Romanian theological students at the Pontifical Greek College of Saint Athanasius in Rome. In 1898, the Romanians were transferred to the Pontifical Urban College for the Propagation of the Faith. In 1930, Pius XI began to lay the foundations for a college of their own, which was finally inaugurated on 9 March 1937.

The patron saint of the college is John of Damascus.

The college's first rector was Angelo Dell'Acqua, and other past rectors include Vasile Cristea, later Romanian bishop in exile, the Benedictine monk Olivier Raquez (1994–2004), and Claudiu-Lucian Pop (2007–2011).

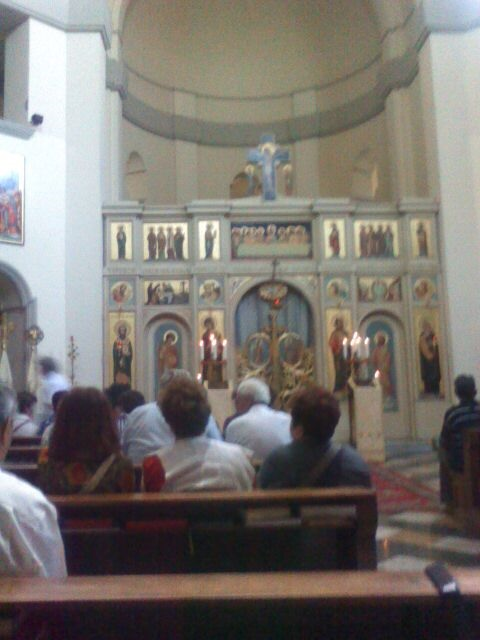
The college chapel in 2009

The college was visited on 15 May 2015 by President Klaus Iohannis and on 12 May 2018 by Viorica Dăncilă, head of the Romanian government.

In May 2022, Pope Francis held an audience with college members to mark the eighty-fifth anniversary of its founding.
