= Ioan Bălan =

Romanian bishop

Blessed Ioan Bălan
- Bishop of Lugoj
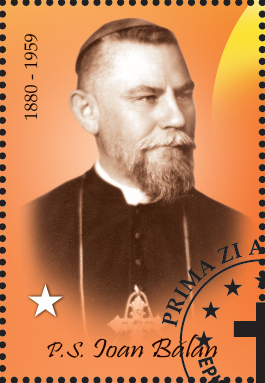
- Bălan on a Romania stamp
- Church: Romanian Greek Catholic Church
- Diocese: Lugoj
- See: Lugoj
- Appointed: 29 August 1936
- Term ended: 4 August 1959
- Predecessor: Alexandru Nicolescu
- Successor: Ioan Ploscaru

Orders
- Ordination: 7 July 1903 by Victor Mihaly de Apșa
- Consecration: 18 October 1936 by Alexandru Nicolescu

Personal details
- Born: Ioan Bălan; 11 February 1880 Tövis, Hungary, Austria-Hungary (Now Teiuș, Romania)
- Died: 4 August 1959 (aged 79) Bucharest, People's Republic of Romania
- Buried: Bellu Cemetery, Bucharest
- Education: University of Vienna

Sainthood
- Feast day: 2 June
- Venerated in: Romanian Greek Catholic Church; Roman Catholic Church
- Beatified: 2 June 2019; Câmpia Libertății, Blaj, Romania by Pope Francis
- Attributes: Episcopal attire

Ioan Bălan (11 February 1880 – 4 August 1959) was a Romanian bishop of the Greek-Catholic Church. He is venerated as a Blessed in the Roman Catholic Church.

== Biography ==
He was born in Teiuș, Alba County, the son of Ștefan Bălan and Ana, née Muntean. After graduating high school in Blaj, he studied theology in Budapest, and was ordained a priest in 1903. He continued his studies in Vienna, moved to Blaj and then in 1909 to Bucharest, where a Greek-Catholic confessor was needed. In 1919 he returned to Blaj, becoming canon and in 1921 rector of the theological academy. In 1936, after Alexandru Nicolescu became Metropolitan of Făgăraș and Alba Iulia, he was consecrated Bishop of Lugoj.

In 1948, the new Communist regime outlawed his church and he was arrested in October after refusing to convert to Romanian Orthodoxy. He was taken first to Dragoslavele Monastery, then to Căldărușani Monastery in early 1949 and to Sighet Prison in mid-1950. In 1955, he was forced to live at Curtea de Argeș Monastery. The following year he was taken to Samurcășești Monastery, a nunnery in Ciorogârla. He remained there in isolation until he became gravely ill and was taken to a Bucharest hospital, where he died. He was buried at the Bellu Catholic cemetery. Bălan was never tried or sentenced.

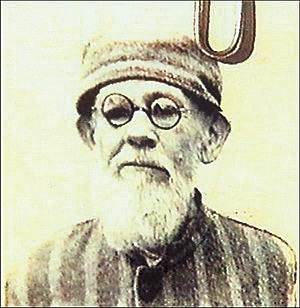
Bălan as political prisoner; photograph from his Securitate file

Bălan and six other prelates who were held as political prisoners during Romania's Communist rule were beatified personally by Pope Francis at Liberty Field in Blaj, Romania on 2 June 2019.
