= Alexandru Nicolescu =

Romanian bishop (1882–1941)

- Archeparch of Făgăraș and Alba Iulia
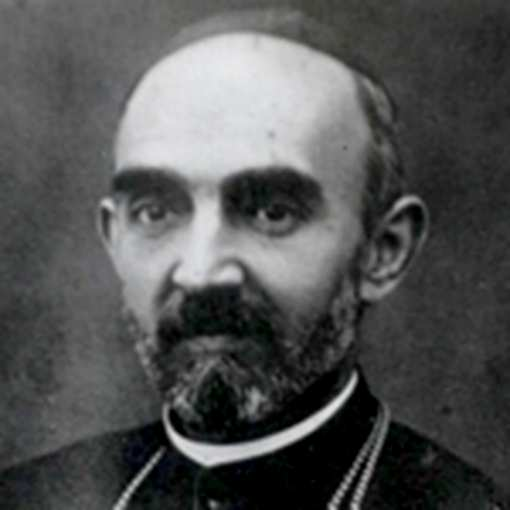
- Church: Romanian Greek Catholic Church
- Archdiocese: Major Archeparchy of Făgăraș and Alba Iulia
- In office: 29 August 1936 – 5 June 1941
- Predecessor: Vasile Suciu
- Successor: Alexandru Todea
- Previous post: Eparch of Lugoj (1922-1936)

Orders
- Ordination: 1904
- Consecration: 18 June 1922 by Vasile Suciu

Personal details
- Born: 8 July 1882 Gyergyótölgyes, Csík County, Kingdom of Hungary, Transleithania, Austria-Hungary
- Died: 5 June 1941 (aged 58)

Alexandru Nicolescu (8 July 1882 – 5 June 1941) was a Romanian bishop of the Greek-Catholic Church. Born in Tulgheș, Harghita County, Transylvania, he studied at the Congregation for the Evangelization of Peoples in Rome from 1898 to 1904, earning a doctorate in Philosophy and Theology. Returning to Blaj, he was sent as a missionary priest to North America. Once back in Transylvania, he taught of moral theology at the Blaj Theological Seminary.

He was named Bishop of Lugoj in 1922, following the transfer of Valeriu Traian Frențiu to Oradea. In 1935, he was elected Metropolitan of Făgăraş and Alba Iulia. Nicolescu served until his death, which was hastened by the beginning of World War II and Romania's loss of Northern Transylvania, events that strained his weak health.
