= Câmpia Libertății =

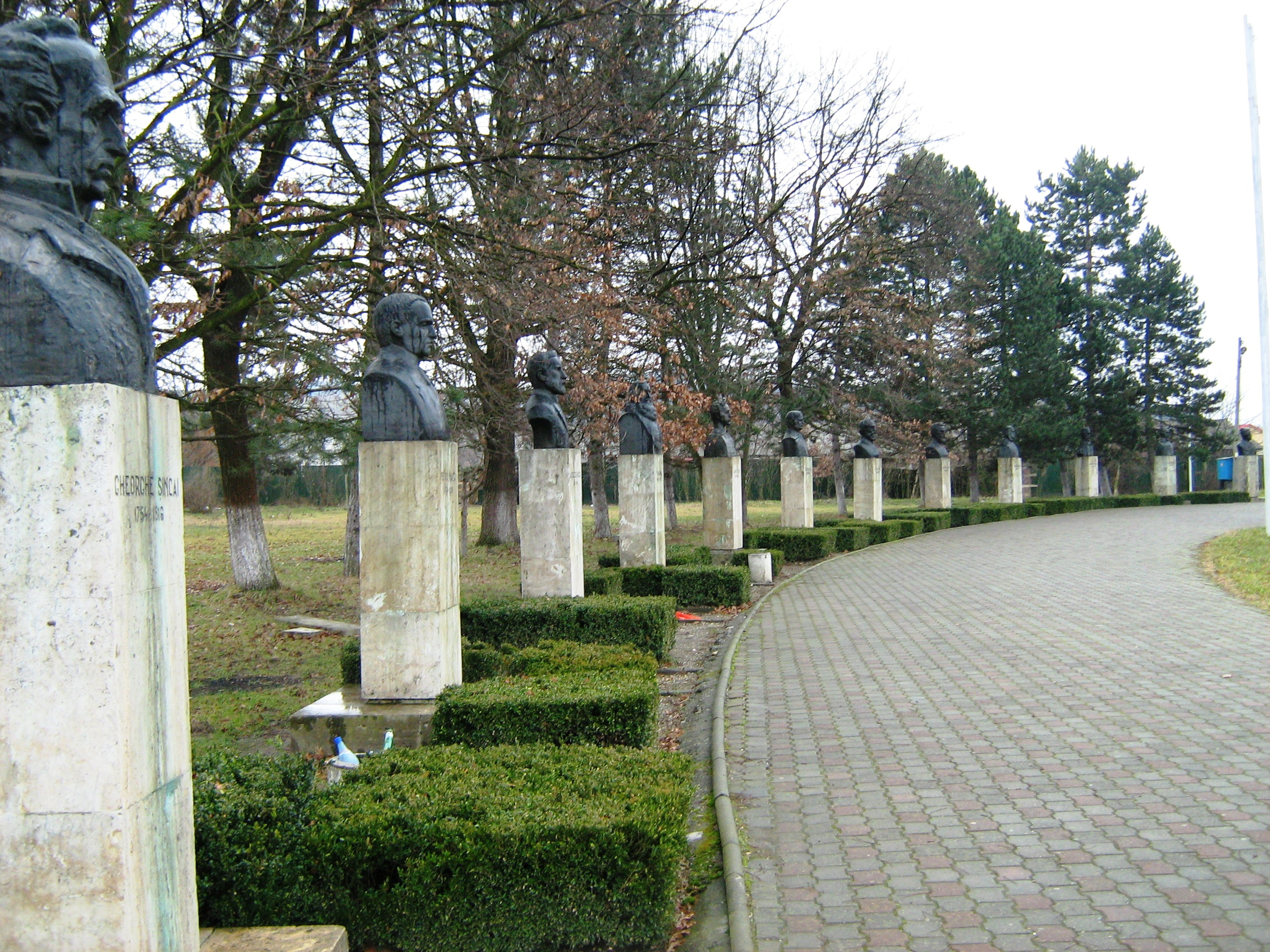
Field of Liberty (as of 2008)

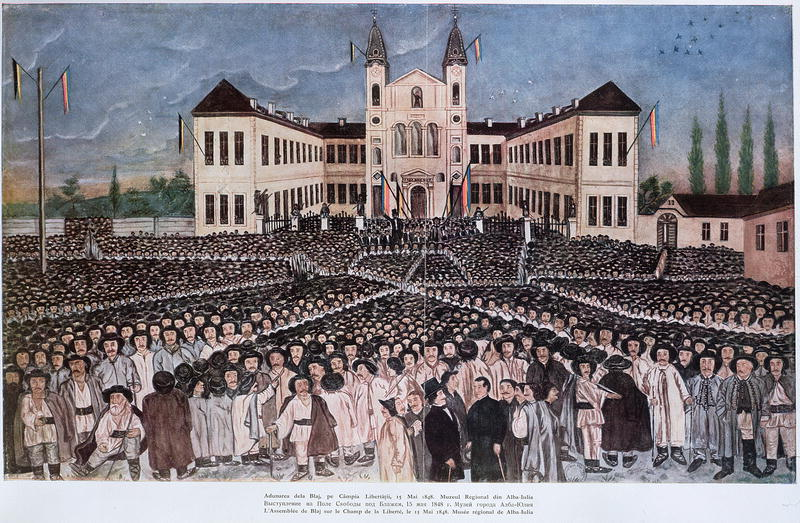
The Blaj National Assembly of May 15, 1848

Câmpia Libertății (The Field of Liberty) is located in the city of Blaj, in Transylvania, Romania. It was the place where two national assemblies were held during the 1848 Revolution, the first one in May, and the second one in September.

The Blaj National Assembly was held here on May 15, 1848, with the participation of some 30–40,000 people.

A sculptural-monumental ensemble rises on the field, composed of a central monument called the "Glory" and 26 busts depicting the heads of the 1848 Revolution and remarkable figures of Romanian culture. Important sculptors such as Ion Vlasiu, Ion Irimescu, Ion Jalea, and Marius Butunoiu contributed to the monument.

On June 2, 2019, seven Greek-Catholic Romanian bishops who were martyred under the communist regime (Vasile Aftenie, Ioan Bălan, Tit Liviu Chinezu, Valeriu Traian Frențiu, Iuliu Hossu, Alexandru Rusu, and Ioan Suciu) were beatified by Pope Francis on this field.
