= Mihai Frățilă =

- Bishop of Bucharest
- Church: Romanian Greek Catholic Church
- Diocese: Bucharest
- See: Bucharest
- Appointed: 29 May 2014
- Term ended: Incumbent

Orders
- Ordination: 11 August 1996 by Lucian Mureşan
- Consecration: 16 December 2007 by Lucian Mureşan

Personal details
- Born: Mihai Cătălin Frățilă; 10 December 1970 (age 55) Alba Iulia, Romania

Mihai Cătălin Frățilă (born 10 December 1970) is a Bishop of the Romanian Church United with Rome, Greek-Catholic. Born in Alba Iulia, he studied at the Pontifical Gregorian and Urbaniana universities between 1991 and 1996, when he was ordained a priest. In 2007, he was selected as auxiliary bishop of the Făgăraş and Alba Iulia Archdiocese and titular bishop of Novae, and the following year he was installed in his headquarters in Bucharest. In May 2014 Pope Francis erected the Eparchy of Saint Basil the Great of Bucharest with Mihai Frățilă as its first bishop.
