= Demetriu Radu =

20th-century Romanian Greek Catholic bishop

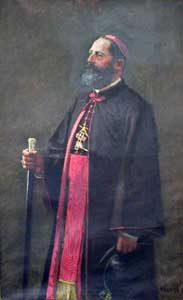
- Bishop Demetriu Radu

Personal details
- Born: October 26, 1862 Tâmpăhaza, now Rădești, Alba County, Romania
- Died: December 8, 1920 (aged 58) Bucharest, Romania
- Buried: Rădești, Alba County
- Denomination: Romanian Church United with Rome, Greek Catholic
- Occupation: Catholic bishop

Demetriu Radu (26 October 1861 – 8 December 1920) was between 1897 and 1903 the Greek Catholic Bishop of Lugoj, and from 1903 to 1920 the Greek Catholic Bishop of Oradea Mare.

== Origins and studies ==
Demetriu Radu was born of peasant parents in Tâmpăhaza (present-day Rădești, Alba County, then in Alsó-Fehér County), south of Aiud.

He was educated by Franciscans in Aiud and in high school in Blaj. In 1879 Radu was sent to Rome to study at St. Athanasius Institute and the College of Propaganda Fide. In Rome he studied for six years, at the end of which he obtained his Ph.D. in theology.

== The Greek Catholic clergy ==
In 1885 Radu was ordained priest in Rome. After ordination, Radu went to Bucharest as a parish priest of the Romanian Church United with Rome, Greek Catholic. In Bucharest he was appointed by the Archbishop Paul Joseph Palma professor of the Theological Seminary, then director of the Archdiocesan Seminary in Bucharest, which had been recently created, and general economic.

On two occasions, being known and appreciated by the ruling circles of the Kingdom of Romania, Radu was sent by the then Prime Minister Ion C. Brătianu and King Carol I of Romania, to the Vatican in order to build bridges to resolve divergences that had arisen between the Kingdom of Romania and the Holy See.

== Greek Catholic Bishop of Lugoj (1897–1903) ==
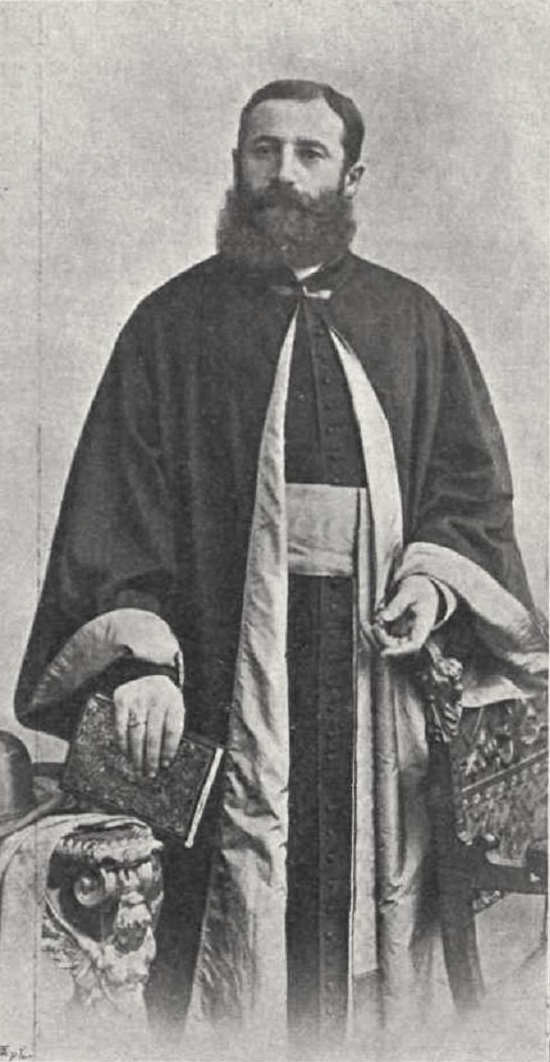
Radu in 1897

On May 9, 1897 Radu was consecrated bishop by Archbishop Victor Mihaly de Apșa of the Holy Trinity Cathedral, Blaj. During the period from 1897 to 1903, Demetriu Radu was Bishop of Lugoj, where he had a special concern for students.

In 1901 Radu ordered and supported the restoration of the Prislop Monastery in current Hunedoara County, which became a place of pilgrimage for the faithful.

== Greek Catholic Bishop of Oradea Mare (1903–1920) ==
Radu rebuilt in 1905 the bishop's palace in Oradea; the designs were produced by architect C. Rimanoczy Jr., has recovered ranges from Beiuș house from Holod and established residence at Stâna de Vale. With a significant amount of money (100,000 Austro-Hungarian krone), Radu helped build the Saint Basil the Great Cathedral, Bucharest in 1909, while in 1910 Radu built the Church of the Descent of the Holy Spirit, in his native village, Rădești.

In 1912 Radu traveled to Rome to discuss the Papal bull concerning the establishment of the Hungarian Greek Catholic diocese of Hajdúdorog. In 1914 Radu began the construction of the Theological Academy of Oradea, but war broke out in that year prevented him to desist of this plane. Radu refused to become spokesman for the Hungarian Prime Minister István Tisza in relation to his nation, unlike the Romanian Orthodox Metropolitan of Sibiu, Basil Mangra, who supported the Austro-Hungarian authorities of the time.

Radu chaired with Ioan Papp, Orthodox Bishop of Arad and Gheorghe Pop de Băsești in the Grand National Assembly in Alba Iulia on December 1, 1918. As dean of the Romanian Episcopate in the Kingdom of Romania, he embraced Romanian General Nicolescu, who became the head of the Romanian Armed Forces in Blaj. On 23 May 1919, Radu was hosted at the Episcopal Palace in Oradea by King Ferdinand I of Romania and Queen Marie of Romania.

On 1 January 1920 Radu participated in the consecration of Archbishop Metropolitan Vasile Suciu with the archepiscopal Pallium.

== Death ==
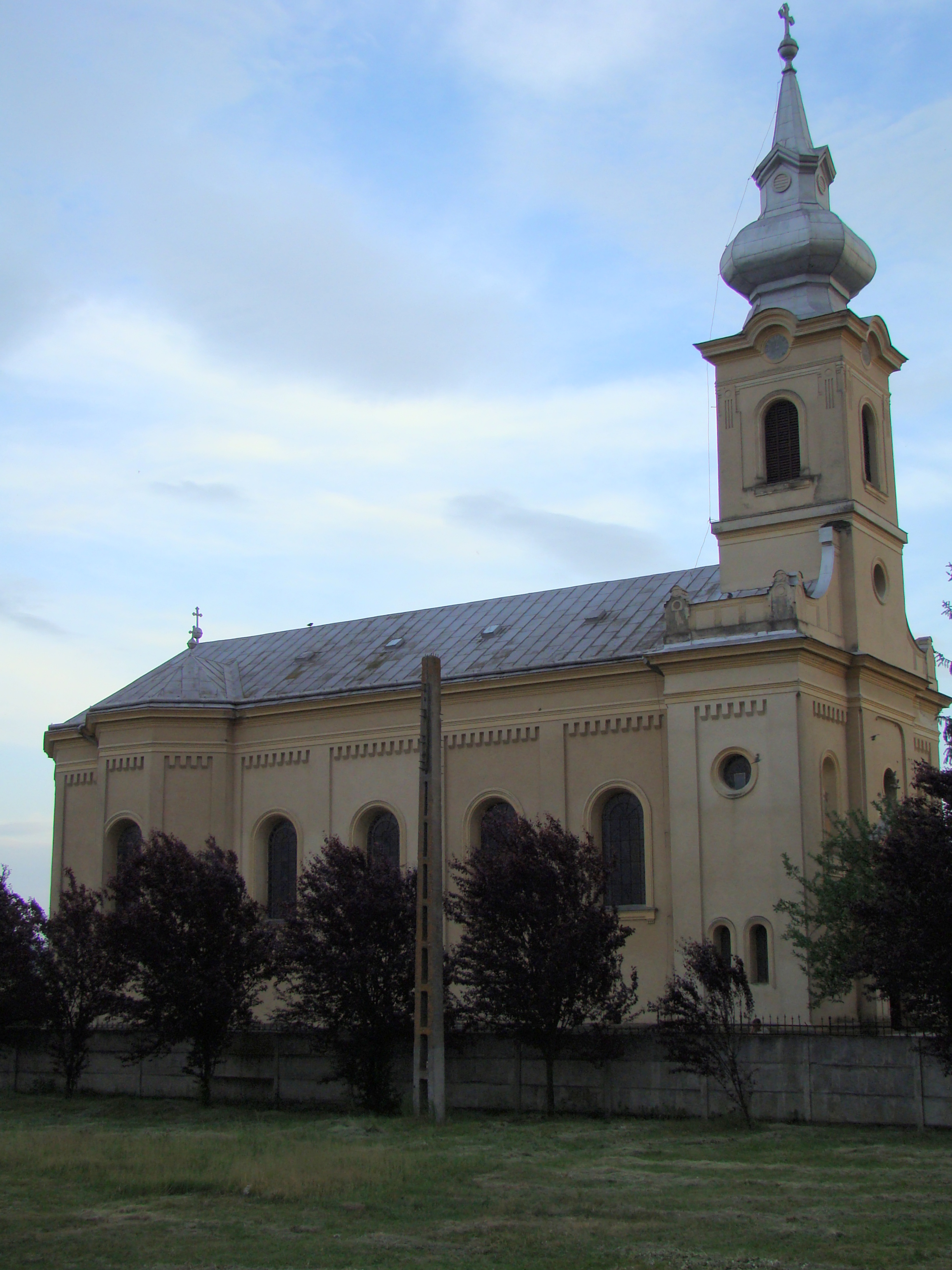
Church in Rădești, founded by Radu in 1910

Radu died on 8 December 1920 in the bombing of the Senate of Romania, an attack staged by Max Goldstein and his associates, Osias Saul and Leon Lichtblau. Following the attack, Justice Minister Dimitrie Greceanu and Senator Spirea Gheorghiu also died.

Radu had a "national funeral as a national martyr". He was buried in the church he founded in his native town.

== Legacy ==
In the 1920s, Radu's native town Tâmpăhaza was named Rădești, in memory and honor of him.

== Bibliography ==
- Ioan M. Bota, History of the Universal Church and Romanian origins until today our appliances, Publishing House "The Christian Life", Cluj-Napoca, 1994, p. 288-289.
- Encyclopedic Dictionary, vol. VI, R-S, Encyclopedic Publishing House, 2006.
