= Claudiu-Lucian Pop =

Romanian Greek Catholic hierarch

- Major Archbishop of Romanian Greek Catholic Church
- Church: Romanian Greek Catholic Church
- Appointed: 5 November 2025
- Predecessor: Lucian Mureșan
- Successor: Incumbent
- Other post: Bishop of Cluj-Gherla (2021–2025, since 2026)
- Previous posts: Rector of the Romanian Pontifical College in Rome (2007–2011), Titular Bishop of Mariamme, Curial Bishop of Romanian Greek Catholic Major Archeparchy of Făgăraș and Alba Iulia (2011–2021)

Orders
- Ordination: 23 July 1995 (Priest) by Vasile Hossu
- Consecration: 8 December 2011 (Bishop) by Leonardo Sandri

Personal details
- Born: Claudiu-Lucian Pop; 22 July 1972 (age 54) Pișcolt, Satu Mare County, Romania
- Education: University of Bucharest (unfinished), Pontifical Urban University, Pontifical Gregorian University
- Motto: Quis ut Deus

Major Archbishop Claudiu-Lucian Pop (born 22 July 1972) is the incumbent Major Archbishop of the Romanian Greek Catholic Church. He served as the Eparchial Bishop of Cluj-Gherla from 14 April 2021 until 5 November 2025, when he was elected by the Romanian Greek-Catholic Bishops Synod as the new Romanian Greek-Catholic Major Archbishop. Previously, he served as the Titular Bishop of Mariamme and Curial bishop of the Romanian Greek Catholic Major Archeparchy of Făgăraș and Alba Iulia from 21 November 2011 until 14 April 2021.

== Career ==
Bishop Pop, after graduation of the school education and the Biological and Chemical Lyceum, joined the Chemical Faculty of the University of Bucharest in 1990, but one year later he began philosophical and theological studies in Rome, Italy in the Pontifical Romanian College (1991–1999), where he graduated Pontifical Urban University and Pontifical Gregorian University. During this time he was ordained as priest on 23 July 1995 for the Romanian Catholic Eparchy of Oradea Mare. From 1999 until 2007 he served as vice-rector, and subsequently rector of the Romanian Greek-Catholic mission in Paris, France. And after that, during 2007–2011, he was a Rector of the Romanian Pontifical College (Pio Romeno) in Rome.

On 21 November 2011, he was confirmed by the Pope Benedict XVI as an Curial Bishop of the Romanian Greek Catholic Major Archeparchy of Făgăraș and Alba Iulia and Titular Bishop of Mariamme. On 8 December 2011, he was consecrated as bishop by Cardinal Leonardo Sandri, Prefect of the Congregation for the Oriental Churches and other hierarchs of the Romanian Greek Catholic Church.

He was elected the head of the Romanian Greek-Catholic Church by the Synod of the Church on 5 November 2025 and confirmed by Pope Leo XIV at the same day, that was published by the Holy See press office on the next day.

He was enthroned as the Major Archbishop on 15 November 2025 in the Cathedral of the Holy trinity Blaj the ceremony was attended by the prefect for the Oriental Congregation Claudio Gugerotti as well as the Metropolitan of the Hungarian Greek Catholic Church Fulop Kocsis.

On 15 October 2026, Pop united the Eparchy of Cluj-Gherla in persona Episcopi with the Romanian Greek Catholic Major Archeparchy of Făgăraș and Alba Iulia, retaining the governance of both jurisdictions in his person. The union was made with the consent of the Synod of Bishops of the Major Archiepiscopal Church and after consultation with the Holy See.

Catholic Church titles
Preceded by Vladimir Tarasevitch	Titular Bishop of Mariamme; 2011–2021	Succeeded by Kuriakose Ostatheos
Preceded by Florentin Crihălmeanu	Eparchial Bishop of Cluj-Gherla; 2021–2025	Vacant
Preceded by Lucian Mureșan	Major Archbishop of Făgăraș and Alba Iulia since 5 November 2025	Incumbent
