= Vasile Suciu (bishop) =

- Archeparch of Făgăraș and Alba Iulia
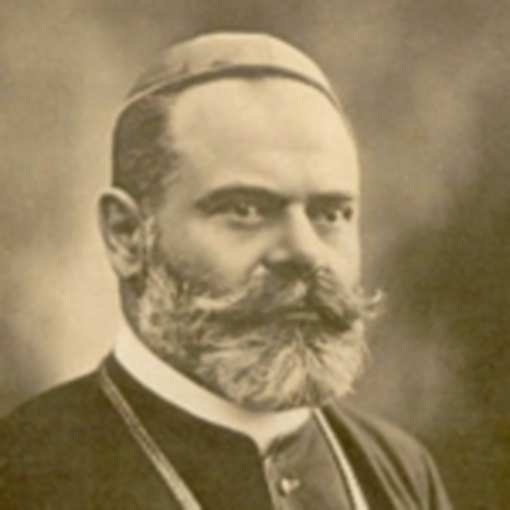
- Church: Romanian Greek Catholic Church
- Archdiocese: Major Archeparchy of Făgăraș and Alba Iulia
- In office: 9 August 1919 – 25 January 1935
- Predecessor: Victor Mihaly de Apșa
- Successor: Alexandru Nicolescu

Orders
- Ordination: 14 July 1895
- Consecration: 25 January 1920 by Demetriu Radu

Personal details
- Born: 13 January 1873 Kopacsel, Herszény, Țara Făgărașului, Kingdom of Hungary, Transleithania, Austria-Hungary
- Died: 25 January 1935 (aged 62) Blaj, Târnava-Mică County, Kingdom of Romania

Vasile Suciu (13 January 1873, Kopacsel, Fogaras County – 25 January 1935, Blaj) was a Romanian Greek-Catholic Metropolitan bishop of the Archdiocese of Făgăraș and Alba Iulia, considered to be the most important theologian of the Greek-Catholic Church in Transylvania.

After completing high school in Blaj, he pursued his theological studies in Rome at the Propaganda Fide, obtaining Ph.D.s in Philosophy (1894) and Theology (1898).

In 1919, he was elected honorary member of the Romanian Academy.

On 1 January 1920, Vasile Suciu was appointed Metropolitan, with approval from the Vatican, and with consent from King Ferdinand I of Romania. During his tenure, a Concordat between the Holy See and the Kingdom of Romania was signed on 10 May 1927, and ratified on 7 July 1929 by the Iuliu Maniu government.

== Works ==
- "Hipnotism și spiritism", Studiu critici-teologic, Blaj, 1906, 198 p.
- "Teologia Dogmatică fundamentală", 2 vol., Blaj, 1907 (vol.I. "Apologetica creștină", VI + 387 p.; vol. II. "Tradițiunea și Biserica", 402 p.; ed. a II-a, Blaj, 1927, 516 + 522 p.)
- "Teologia Dogmatică specială", 2 vol., Blaj, 1908 (vol.I, "Dumnezeu unul. Sfânta Treime. Dumnezeu Creatorul. Întruparea Domnului. Grația", 606 p., vol. II. "Sacramentele în general. Sacramentele în special. Eshatologia", 604 p., ed. a II-a, Blaj, 1927, 631 + 700 p.)
