= Lucian Mureșan =

Romanian Catholic cardinal (1931–2025)

His Most Eminent Beatitude Lucian Mureșan
- Cardinal, Major Archbishop of Făgăraș-Alba Iulia
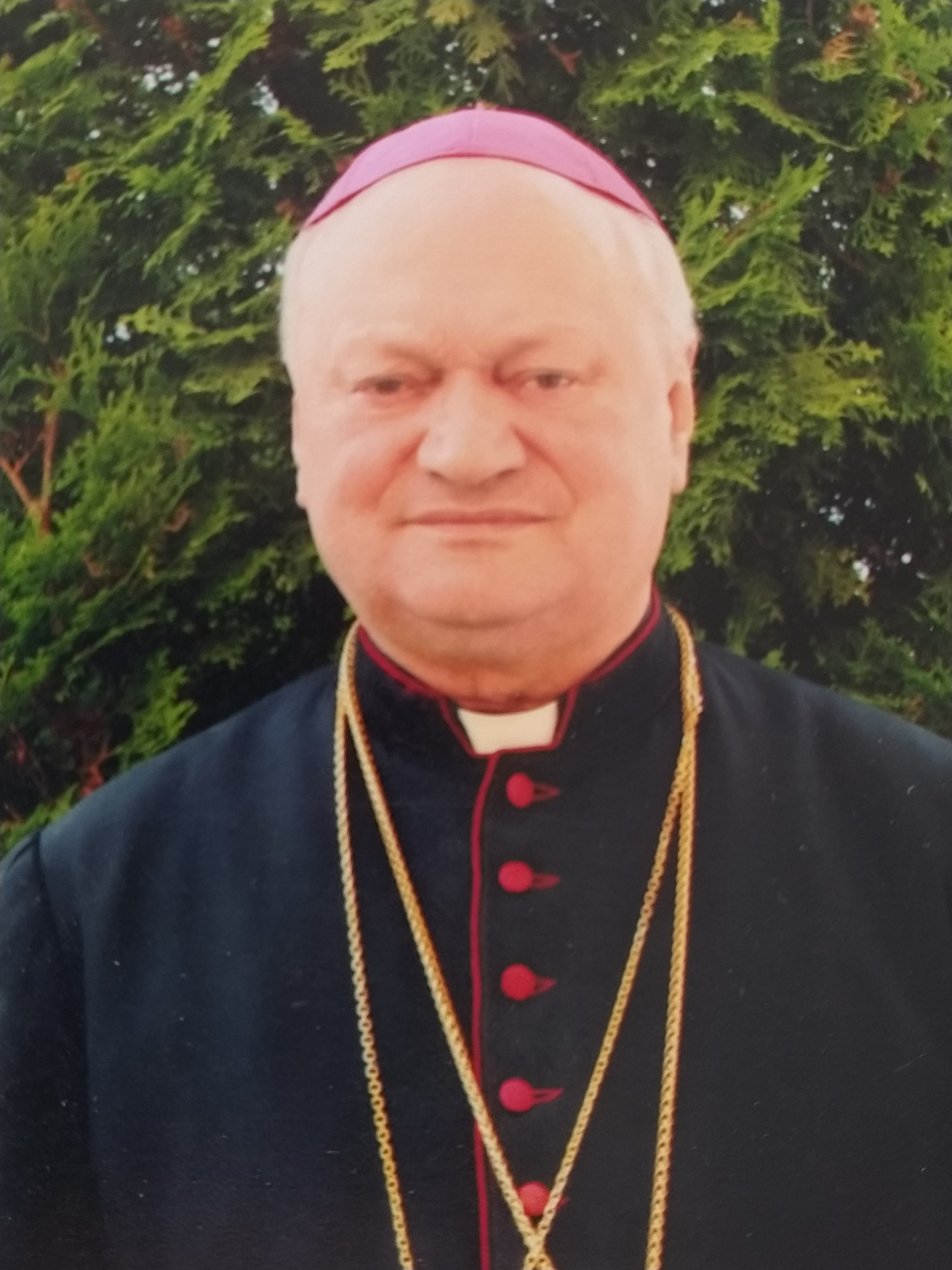
- Mureșan in 2004
- Church: Romanian Greek Catholic Church
- Archdiocese: Archdiocese of Făgăraș and Alba Iulia (Romanian)
- Appointed: 16 December 2005
- Installed: 30 April 2006
- Term ended: 25 September 2025
- Predecessor: Alexandru Todea
- Successor: Claudiu-Lucian Pop
- Other posts: Cardinal-priest of Sant'Atanasio; Chairman of the Romanian Episcopal Conference
- Previous posts: Bishop of Maramureș (1990–1994); Archbishop of Făgăraș și Alba Iulia (1994–2005)

Orders
- Ordination: 19 December 1964 by Ioan Dragomir
- Consecration: 27 May 1990 by Alexandru Todea
- Created cardinal: 18 February 2012 by Benedict XVI
- Rank: Cardinal-priest

Personal details
- Born: 23 May 1931 Firiza, Romania
- Died: 25 September 2025 (aged 94) Blaj, Romania
- Denomination: Romanian Greek-Catholic
- Motto: Fiat voluntas tua ("Thy will be done")

Styles of Lucian Mureșan
- Reference style: His Eminence
- Spoken style: Your Eminence
- Informal style: Cardinal
- See: Greek Catholic Archeparchy of Făgăraș and Alba Iulia

Lucian Mureșan (23 May 1931 – 25 September 2025) was a Romanian Greek Catholic prelate who served as Major Archbishop of Făgăraș and Alba Iulia and head of the Romanian Greek Catholic Church from 2005 until his death in 2025. He previously served as archbishop there from 1994 to 2005 and as Bishop of Maramureș from 1990 to 1994. He was made a cardinal in 2012.

== Biography ==
=== Early life ===
Lucian Mureșan was born on 23 May 1931 in the village of Firiza (now the Ferneziu district of Baia Mare), in the Kingdom of Romania. He was the tenth of Peter and Maria (Breban) Mureșan's twelve children. He attended primary school in Firiza from 1938 to 1944, and secondary school in Baia Mare at the Gheorghe Șincai High School from 1944 to 1948.

Education for the priesthood was prohibited when he came of age, as the Romanian Greek Catholic Church was completely suppressed by Romania's Communist government. Between 1948 and 1951, Mureșan attended school for woodworking, focusing on fine furniture in Baia Mare while continuing his academic studies part-time. From 1951 to 1954, he performed his mandatory military service first at the aviation school in Turnișor, Sibiu County and then at the jet aviation battalion in Craiova. In 1953, because of his connection with the Romanian Greek Catholic Church, he was transferred from the air force to work on the construction of Romania's first large hydroelectric plant at the Bicaz Dam.

In 1955, he became one of a handful of students at the Roman Catholic Theological Institute in Alba-Iulia under Bishop Márton Áron, who had been released from prison but remained under house arrest. However, a government crackdown ended his studies during his fourth year at the institute.

Since his religious affiliation made Mureșan unemployable in mining and construction, he worked at the quarry near his home town for almost a decade, and then for the Department of Roads and Bridges in Maramureș, until he retired in June 1990. He had continued to study in secret with former theology professors and completed a licensing exam, so that he was prepared for ordination when the government released Romania's bishops from prison in 1964.

=== Priest ===
Mureșan was ordained a priest on 19 December 1964 by Ioan Dragomir, auxiliary bishop of Maramureș, in the basement of a building in Cluj. As instructed by Dragomir, he even kept his ordination secret from his parents. He exercised his pastoral ministry in hiding, mainly dedicated to young people and those who wanted to become priests, while continuing his secular employment. He later worked as a priest more openly in the diocese of Maramureș.

After Dragomir's death on 25 April 1985, Mureșan was provisional ordinary of the diocese of Maramureș until 9 August 1986, when, having been proposed by the diocesan chapter, he was installed in that office by Archbishop of Făgăraș and Alba Iulia Alexandru Todea.

=== Bishop ===
Following the Romanian Revolution of December 1989, the Romanian Catholic Church gained legal status and began to function publicly. On 14 March 1990, Mureșan was elected eparch of Maramureș of the Romanians. Pope John Paul gave his assent the next day. He received his episcopal consecration on 27 May on the terrace of the Romanian Soldier's Monument in Baia Mare, (Note: Government authorities had not yet returned the Greek-Catholic cathedral in Baia Mare over to the Church.) from Archbishop Todea, assisted by Ioan Ploscaru, Bishop of Lugoj, and Guido del Mestri, a veteran member of the diplomatic service of the Holy See who had been expelled from Romania in 1950, in the presence of 100 priests and more than 20,000 faithful. It was the first meeting of the entire Greek Catholic hierarchy at a large public event and included the presence of a papal representative. At the ceremony, the President of the Republic read the legal decree recognizing his title. Mureșan opened the new Baia Mare Theological Institute in the academic year 1990-1991. It included a 3-year program for training religion teachers.

He was named metropolitan archbishop of Făgăraș and Alba Iulia of the Romanians on 4 July 1994, and on 27 August he was installed in Blaj.

He convened and participated in the four sessions of the Fourth Provincial Council of the Romanian Greek Catholic Church, held between 1995 and 1998.

He participated in 1995 in the celebrations of the 50th anniversary of the Romanian Catholic Mission in Paris, celebrating Mass in Romanian at Notre-Dame Cathedral in Paris. In August 1997, through his efforts, the remains of Dom Inocențiu Micu-Klein were taken from Rome, where he died in exile, to the cathedral he founded in Blaj.

Mureșan was elected president of the Episcopal Conference of Romania on multiple occasions and served in the position from 1998 to 2001, 2004 to 2007 and 2010 to 2012.

Between 7 and 9 May 1999, he received Pope John Paul II during his visit to Romania, which was limited to Bucharest at the request of the Orthodox Church. (Note: This was the first papal visit to a predominantly Orthodox country.) During the Jubilee of the Year 2000, he organized a national pilgrimage to Rome, culminating on 9 May with a concelebrated mass in Romanian with Pope John Paul II in St. Peter's Basilica with the thousands of Romanian pilgrims in attendance.

On 26 May 2003, Mureșan was appointed a member of the Congregation for the Oriental Churches. (Note: The same appointment was announced by the Holy See Press Office on 28 June 2003.)

At the October 2005 Synod of Bishops, he described the meaning of the Eucharist under Romania's Communist government:

In our country, Romania, the communists tried to give man material bread alone, and wanted to chase ‘the bread of God’ from society and from the heart of the human person. Now, we realize that, outlawing our Greek Catholic Church, they were very afraid of the God present in the Eucharist.... Instead how many Masses have there been, clandestinely celebrated in a spoon rather than the chalice and with wine made from grapes found in the street.... These modern martyrs of the 20th century offered all their suffering to the Lord for dignity and human freedom.

His remarks drew a rare round of applause from the synod fathers.

He was promoted to the status of major archbishop on 16 December 2005, when Pope Benedict XVI recognized the self-governing status of the Romanian Greek Catholic Church and raised the Archdiocese of Făgăraș and Alba Iulia to the status of major archdiocese. (Note: In the papal bull dated 14 December 2005 erecting the major archdiocese, Pope John Paul wrote that he was acting "to meet the demands of venerable brother Lucian Mureșan, Archbishop of Fagarasi and Alba Juliani of Romania, who, in the name of the Council of Hierarchs, demanded that this Church be raised to the status and dignity of a Major Archbishopric.") He was installed as major archbishop on 30 April 2006 in the presence of the prefect of the Congregation for the Oriental Churches, Cardinal Ignatius Moses I Daoud.

=== Cardinal ===
On 18 February 2012, Pope Benedict XVI made Mureșan Cardinal-Priest of Sant'Atanasio. As he was already older than 80 at the time of his creation, he was never eligible to vote in a papal conclave. He was generally counted as the third Romanian to become a cardinal after Iuliu Hossu and Alexandru Todea, though Hossu's elevation to the rank of cardinal was not announced while he lived. (Note: Hossu died in May 1970 and Pope Paul VI only announced in March 1973 that he had made Hossu a cardinal in pectore, or secretly, in April 1969.)

Mureșan was named a member of the Congregation for Oriental Churches again on 21 April 2012.

On 24 October 2012, he was named an honorary member of the philosophy, theology, psychology and pedagogy section of the Romanian Academy.

On 6 June 2015, Mureșan received the national commendation Order of the Star of Romania, officer rank from President Klaus Iohannis of Romania.

In June 2019, he celebrated Mass at the beatification of seven Romanian martyred bishops, as Pope Francis presided, having made a point of visiting Blaj for the ceremony.

== Death ==
Mureșan died on 25 September 2025, at the age of 94. His death was reported by the Archdiocese of Alba Iulia and Făgăraș in a press release.

== Notes ==
Catholic Church titles
Preceded by Ioan Dragomir	Bishop of Maramureș; 27 May 1990 – 4 July 1994	Succeeded by Ioan Șișeștean
Preceded by Alexandru Todea	Archbishop of Făgăraș and Alba Iulia; 4 July 1994 – 16 December 2005	Major Archbishop of Făgăraș and Alba Iulia
New title	Major Archbishop of Făgăraș and Alba Iulia; 16 December 2005 – 25 September 2025	Succeeded by Claudiu-Lucian Pop
Preceded by Josyf Slipyj	Cardinal Priest of Sant'Atanasio; 18 February 2012 – 25 September 2025	Succeeded by Vacant
