= Romanian Greek Catholic Church =

Eastern Catholic church

Coordinates: 46.1735°N 23.9208°E

- Biserica Română Unită cu Roma, Greco-Catolică
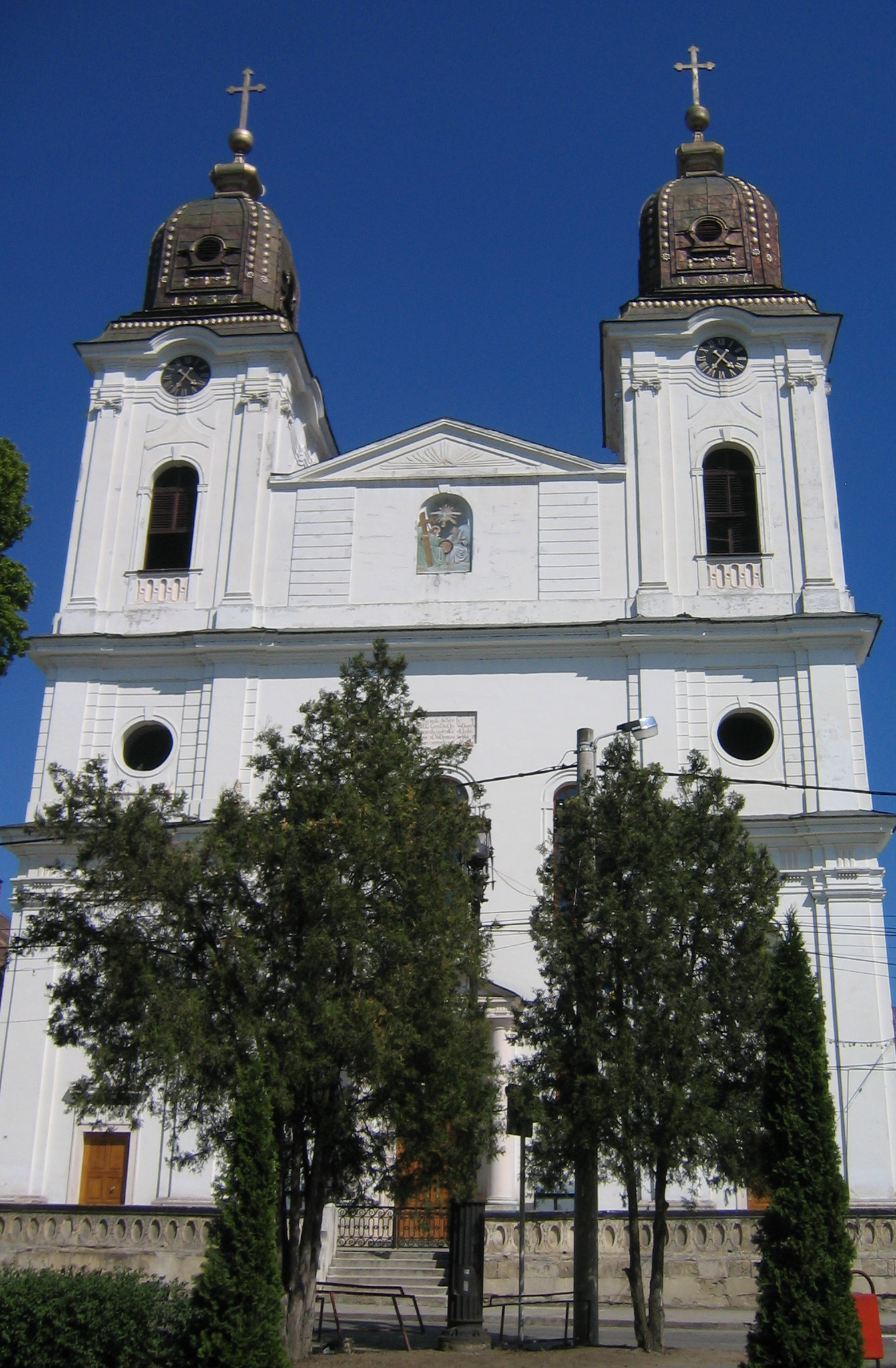
- Holy Trinity Cathedral, Blaj
- Type: Particular church (sui iuris)
- Classification: Christian
- Orientation: Eastern Catholic
- Scripture: Bible
- Theology: Catholic theology
- Polity: Episcopal
- Pope: Leo XIV
- Major Archbishop: Claudiu-Lucian Pop
- Bishops: 7
- Eparchies: 7
- Vicariates: 3
- Parishes: 1,240
- Deaneries: 75
- Language: Romanian
- Liturgy: Byzantine Rite
- Headquarters: Holy Trinity Cathedral, Blaj
- Territory: Romania
- Possessions: United States; Canada
- Origin: 1698
- Recognition: 1700
- Separated from: Ecumenical Patriarchate of Constantinople (1698)
- Members: 480,000 throughout the world (recent Catholic estimate), 150,593 in the 2011 Romanian census, 115,364 in the 2021 Romanian census 6,000 in North America in 2020, 1,000 in Germany, 1,000 in Austria
- Priests: 882
- Places of worship: 413
- Official website: bisericaromanaunita.ro

The Romanian Greek Catholic Church, (Note: Romanian: Biserica Română Unită cu Roma, Greco-Catolică; Latin: Ecclesia Graeco-Catholica Romaniae) or Romanian Church United with Rome, is a sui iuris Eastern Catholic church in full union with the Catholic Church. It has the rank of a major archiepiscopal church and uses the Byzantine liturgical rite in the Romanian language. It is one of the major archiepiscopal churches of the Catholic Church which are not distinguished with a patriarchal title. Although part of the Catholic Church, the Romanian Government, within its list of officially recognised religious denominations, counts it and the Roman-Rite Church as two separate denominations.

Cardinal Lucian Mureșan, Archbishop of Făgăraș and Alba Iulia, served as the head of the Romanian Greek Catholic Church from 1994 until his death in September 2025. On December 16, 2005, as the Romanian Church United with Rome, the Greek Catholic church was elevated to the rank of a major archiepiscopal church by Pope Benedict XVI, with Lucian Mureșan becoming its first major archbishop. Mureşan was made a cardinal at the consistory of February 18, 2012.

Besides the Archeparchy of Făgăraș and Alba Iulia, there are five more Greek-Catholic eparchies in Romania (Eparchy of Oradea Mare, Eparchy of Cluj-Gherla, Eparchy of Lugoj, Eparchy of Maramureș, and Eparchy of Saint Basil the Great of Bucharest), as well as one eparchy overseas, the Romanian Catholic Eparchy of St George's in Canton (in Ohio), answering directly to the major archbishop and the Holy See, in the United States of America and Canada.

According to data published in the 2016 Annuario Pontificio, the Romanian Greek Catholic Church had 504,280 members, 8 bishops, 1,225 parishes, some 835 diocesan priests and 235 seminarians of its own rite at the end of 2012. However, according to the 2011 Romanian government census, the number of its followers living in Romania was as low as 150,593, of whom 124,563 are ethnic Romanians. By 2022, however, the church estimated their numbers have grown to 488,000, as many citizens whose ancestors had converted to Orthodoxy or embraced Marxist-Leninist atheism under the communist regime have chosen to rejoin the Greek Catholic Church. There are five other Catholic dioceses of the Latin Church in Romania whose membership is more numerous.

== History ==
Administrative map of the Greek-Catholic (Unified) Church in Romania

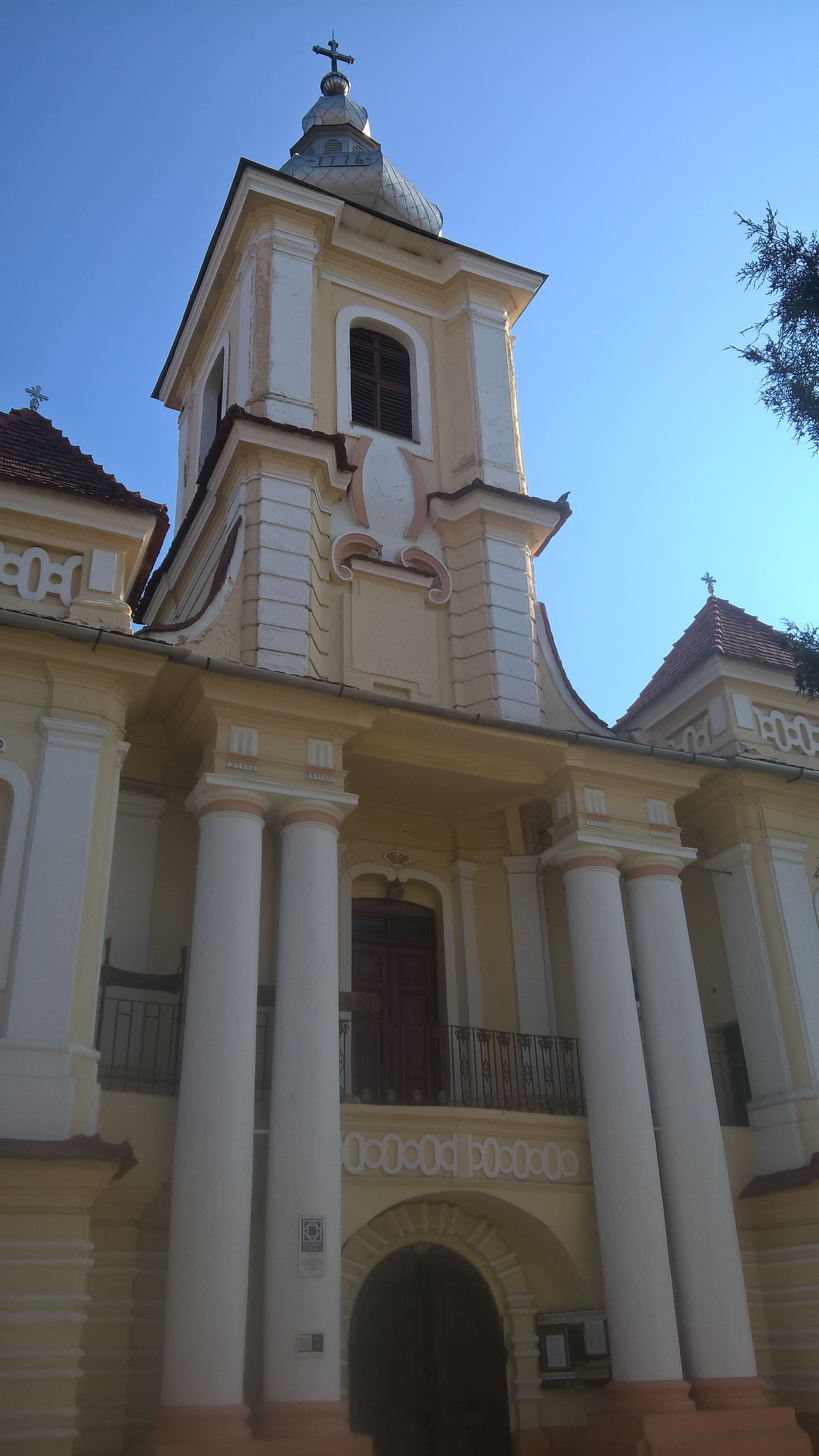
The old Greek-Catholic Church in Sibiu, built by bishop Grigore Maior

Following the Habsburg conquest of Transylvania in 1687, Metropolitan Atanasie Anghel entered into full communion with the See of Rome by the Act of Union of 1698, that was formalized by a synod of bishops on September 4, 1700. This was part of the process the unification of the Romanian Orthodox population to the Catholic Church (Rome's Church) newly created Greek Catholic Church, the former Orthodox Church of Romanians from Transylvania.

By entering into the Union, Atanasie and the other bishops, along with their respective dioceses, accepted the supreme authority of the Pope, while at the same time being granted the right to keep their own Greek Byzantine liturgical rite. A diploma issued by the Emperor Leopold I declared that Transylvania's Romanian Orthodox Church is one with the Catholic Church and the Holy See. Transylvanian Romanians were therefore encouraged to convert to Catholicism and join to the Romanian Unified Church (Greek-Catholic Church), while being able to retain the Byzantine rite, if at the same time they accepted four doctrinal points promulgated by the Council of Florence (1431 and 1445): the supreme authority of the Pope over the entire church; the existence of Purgatory; the Filioque clause; and the validity of the use of unleavened bread in the celebration of the Eucharist in the Latin Church (Eastern Orthodox had contended that Latin Catholic use of unleavened bread was erroneous).

The step undertaken by Metropolitan Atanasie Anghel and his Holy Synod obtained for the ethnic Romanians of Transylvania (then part of the Habsburg monarchy) equal rights with those of the other Transylvanian nations, which were part of the Unio Trium Nationum: the Hungarian nobility, the Transylvanian Saxons, and the Székely. This event coincided with the arrival of the Jesuits in Transylvania (second time), who attempted to align this province more closely with Western Europe. Because of this, the Romanian Greek Catholic clergy backed the Imperial authorities during Rákóczi's War of Independence. However, Orthodox Serbian authority and Protestant Transylvanian nobility were not willing to accept Romanians Orthodox converts, and this in turn led to the formation of Romanian Orthodox movements that advocated for freedom of worship for the entire Transylvanian population – most notable the movements led by serbian monk Visarion Sarai, Nicolae Oprea Miclăuş, and the bosniac monk Sofronie of Cioara, under the influence of the dominant Serbian Orthodox Church.

In 1721, the bishop's residence was moved from Alba Iulia to Făgăraș, and eventually to Blaj (1737). Following this change, Blaj became a center of learning and national awakening for all Romanians.

In 1761, Petru Pavel Aron (1709–1764), the Bishop of Făgăraș and head of the Romanian Greek Catholic Church, translated Biblia Vulgata into Romanian. While the Romanian Orthodox kept Church Slavonic as the official liturgical language till 1863, the Romanian Church United with Rome has been using the Romanian vernacular ever since its inception. In the 19th century, during a time when the Hungarian government was pursuing a Magyarization policy in Transylvania, the Romanian Greek-Catholic Church, with the aid of the Transylvanian School (Școala Ardeleană) and the Transylvanian Memorandum, played a prominent role in resisting ethnic assimilation attempts. Moreover, many leading figures of the Romanian emancipation movement in Transylvania, such as Simion Bărnuțiu and Iuliu Maniu, began their careers as lay servants of the Greek-Catholic Church.

Additional Greek-Catholic Eparchies were eventually set up at Oradea (1777), as well as Gherla and Lugoj (1853); Blaj, under the title of Eparchy of Alba Iulia and Făgăraș, became the metropolitan (i.e. archiepiscopal) see. On December 16, 2005, the Romanian Greek-Catholic Church was elevated to the rank of major archiepiscopal church.

=== Persecution under communism ===
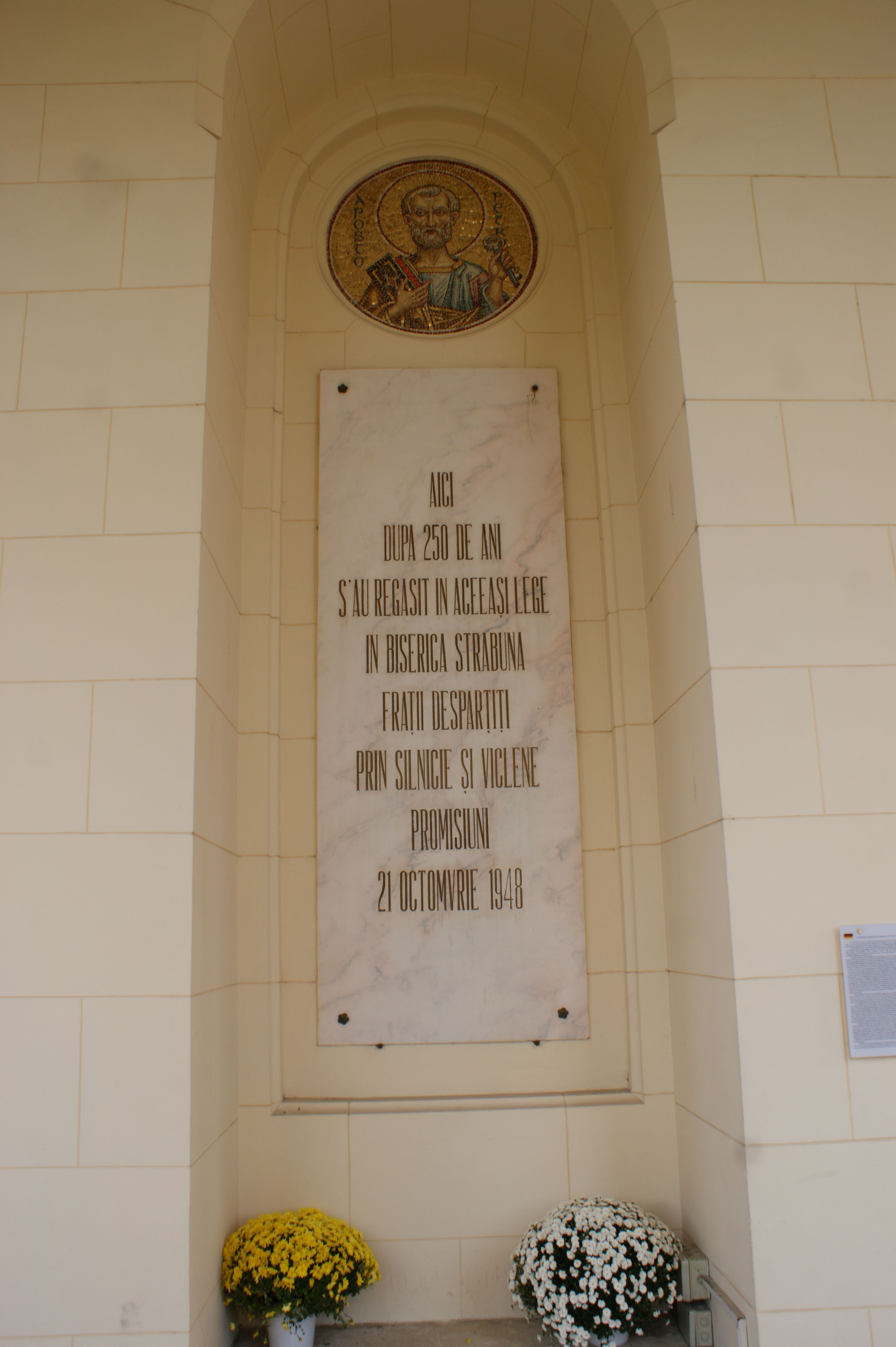
Marble plate at the Holy Trinity Orthodox Cathedral of Alba Iulia commemorating the dissolution of the Greek Catholic Church in 1948, with the following text: "Here, after 250 years, brothers separated by force and deceitful promises found themselves in the same ancient church."

After assuming political power in 1948, the Communist regime, rooted in Marxist–Leninist atheism, deposed all 12 bishops of the Greek-Catholic Church on Stalin's orders. Moreover, on October 21, 1948, the 250th anniversary of the Romanian Greek Catholic Union with the Catholic Church, the regime arranged for the "voluntary" and "spontaneous" transfer of all members of the Greek-Catholic Church (decree 358/1948), that numbered more than 1,500,000 at the time, to the Romanian Orthodox Church; furthermore, the property rights over many of the Greek-Catholic Church's possessions, including its four cathedrals, were transferred to the Romanian Orthodox Church, while the remainder of those properties were confiscated by the Romanian State.

The Greek-Catholic bishops, along with many of their priests, were accused by the newly installed Communist authorities of "antidemocratic activity". After refusing to give up their ties with the "reactionary" Holy See, they were imprisoned. At about the same time, the Orthodox Church was being "purged" of priests hostile to the Communist regime. Following this purge, the Orthodox hierarchy enjoyed good and unforced relations with the communist authorities for the remainder of the Communist Rule of Romania.

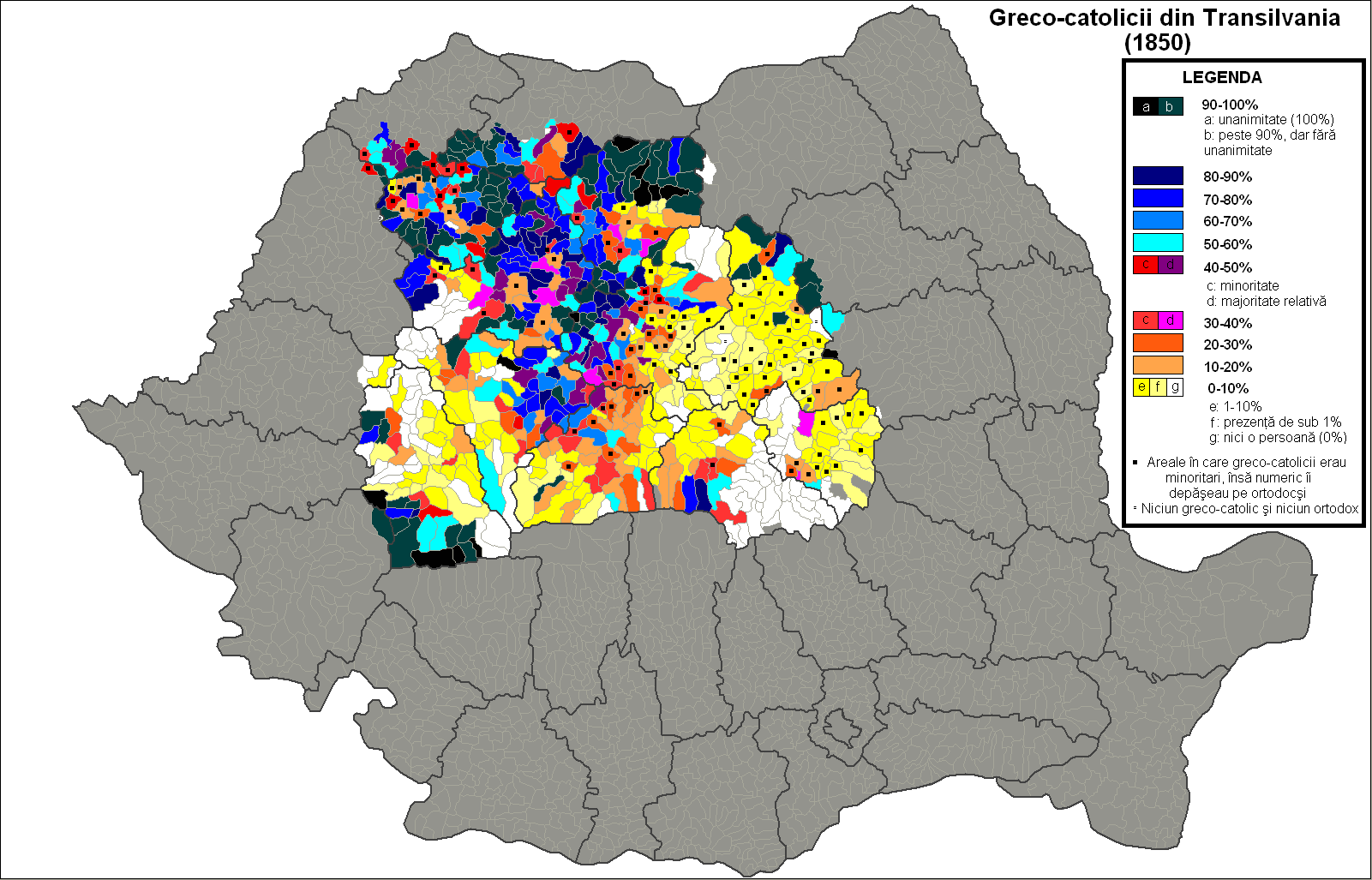
Greek-Catholics in historical Transylvania (1850 census)

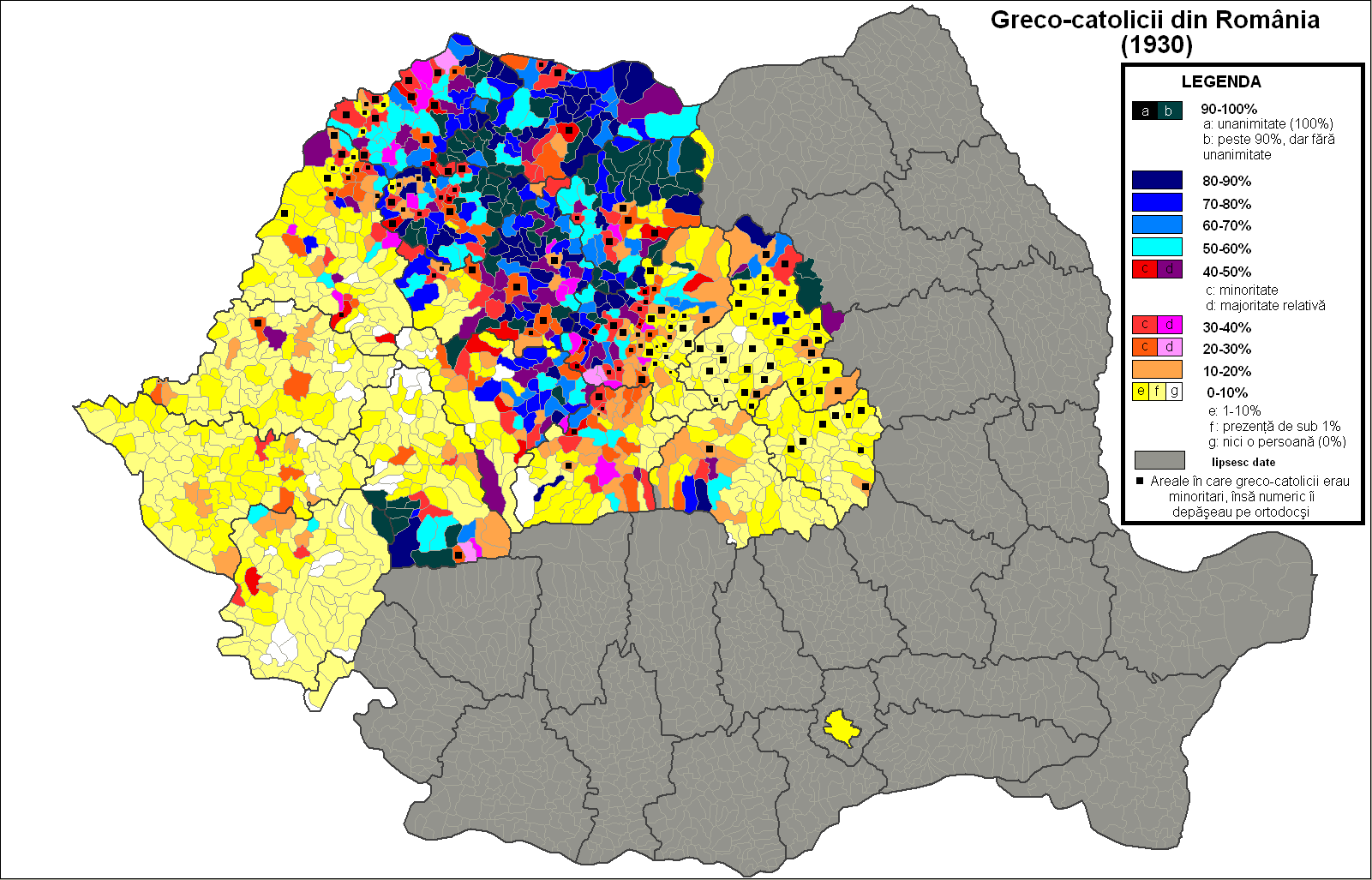
Greek-Catholics in Banat, Crișana, Maramureș and Transylvania (1930 census)

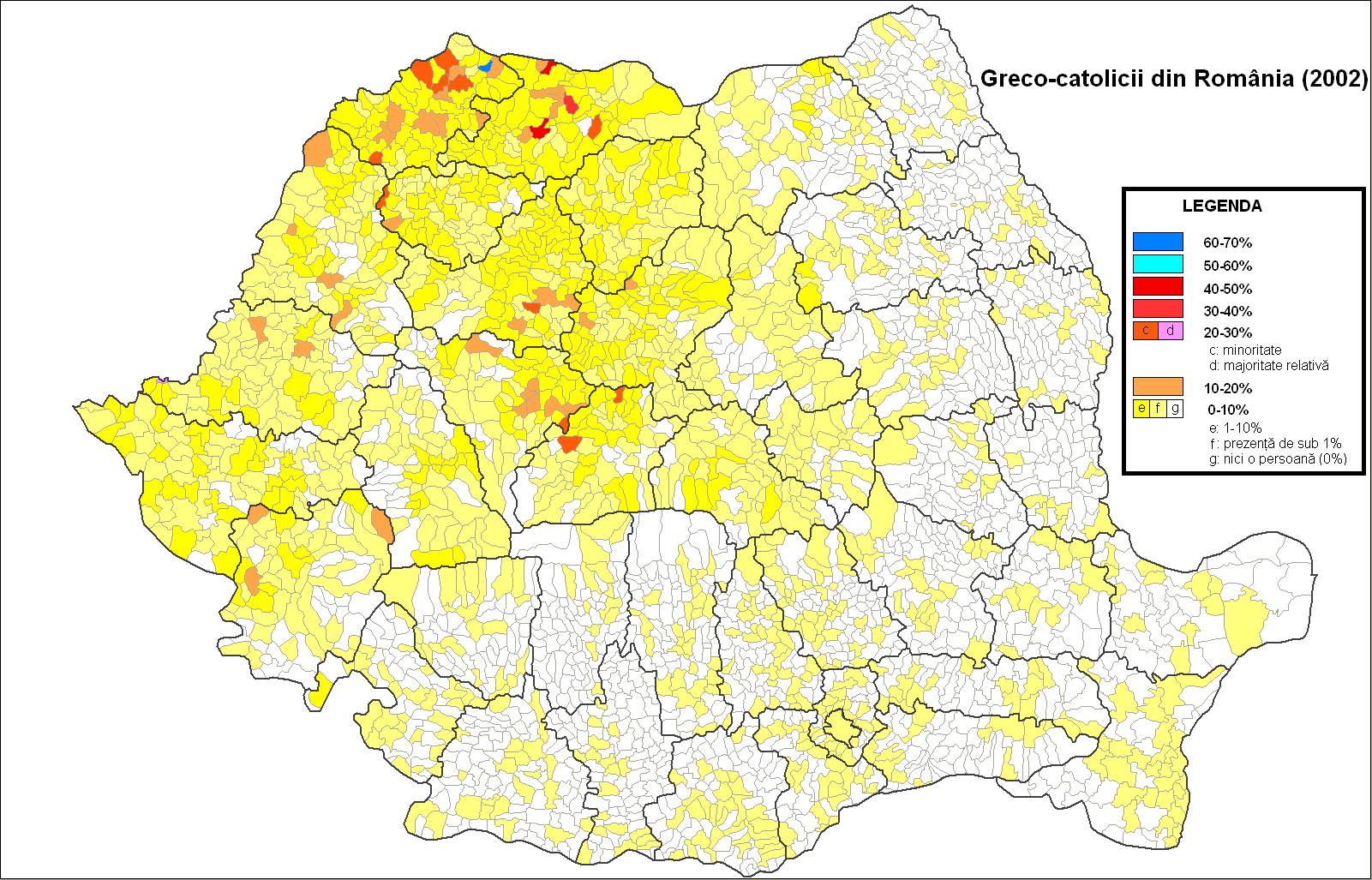
Greek-Catholics in Romania (2002 census)

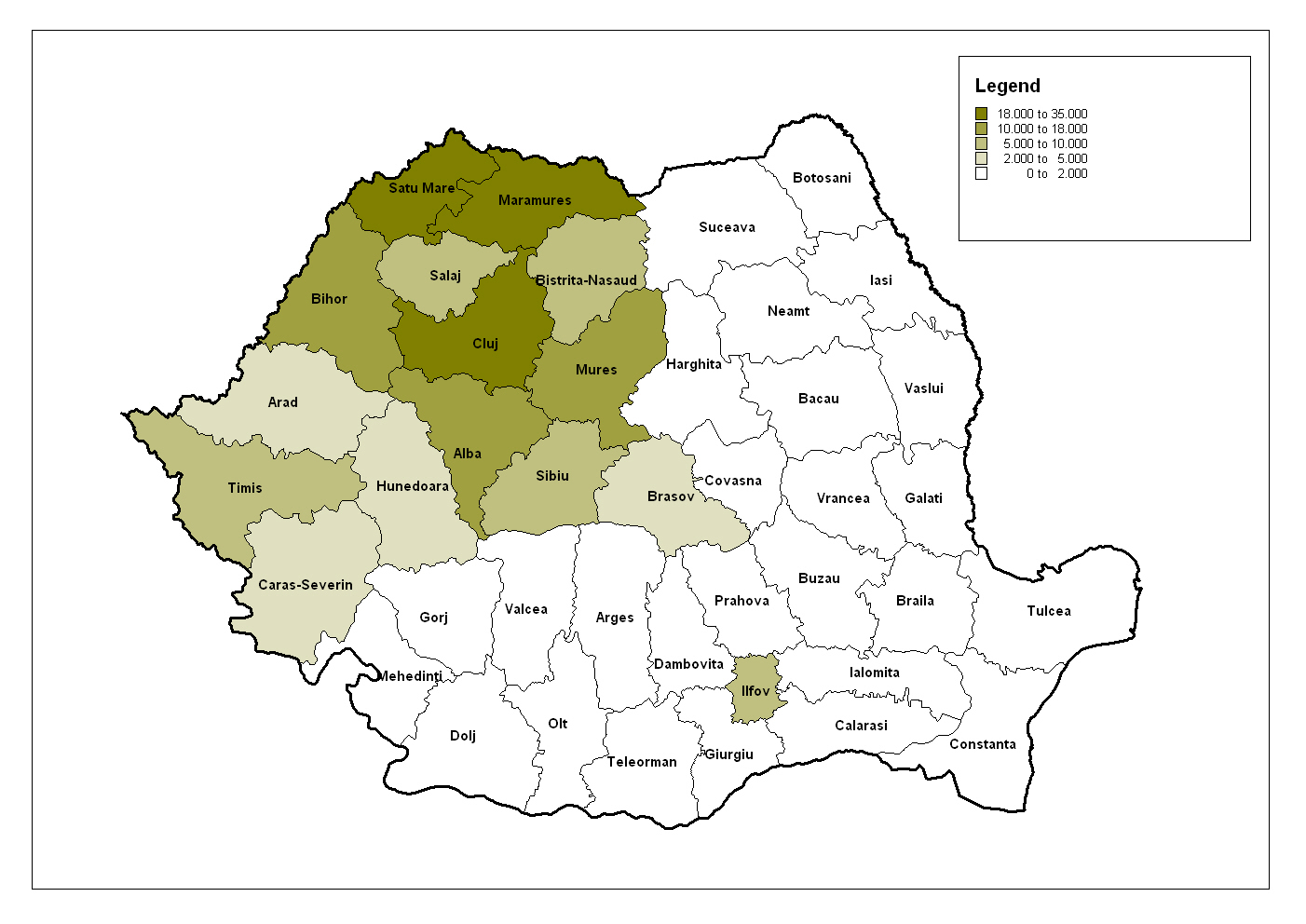
Greek-Catholic presence, according to the 2002 census

Iuliu Hossu, Bishop of Cluj, turned down a proposal of the Romanian Orthodox Patriarch, Iustinian Marina, to convert to Orthodoxy and be named Orthodox Archbishop of Iaşi and metropolitan of Moldavia, and thereby become the official successor of the Romanian Orthodox Patriarch himself. Consequently, Hossu remained under house arrest. Year after year, he sent Memorandums to the President of the Republic, requesting that the country's laws and international agreements be observed with regard to the Romanian Greek-Catholic Church. In 1969, Pope Paul VI asked Hossu to allow himself to be made a cardinal. As Hossu was reluctant to leave Romania, the pope made him a cardinal only "in pectore", i.e. without publishing the fact, and this was only revealed on March 5, 1973, three years after Hossu's death.

Another remarkable Romanian Greek-Catholic ecclesiastic of the time was Alexandru Todea (1912–2002). Secretly consecrated a bishop on November 19, 1950, he was arrested and the following year he was sentenced to life in prison. He was granted amnesty in 1964. On March 14, 1990, after the fall of the Communist regime, he was appointed Archbishop of Făgăraș and Alba Iulia, and was made a cardinal the following year.

After more than 40 years of clandestine existence, the Romanian Church United with Rome, Greek-Catholic re-emerged publicly, in the wake of the Romanian Revolution. Normative Act 9/31, passed on December 31, 1989, repealed Decree 358/1948 (that outlawed the Greek-Catholic Church) as repugnant and bringing grave prejudice upon the Romanian state.

Only after much struggle and considerable delays, some of the church's properties, in particular the cathedrals of Cluj, Blaj, Lugoj, and Oradea, were restored to their rightful owner. However, much of the original property remains in Romanian Orthodox or government hands, as the persecution started in 1948 has led to a marked reduction in the numbers of Romanian Greek Catholic faithful. After 40 years of Communist rule and forced assimilation into the regime-approved Orthodox Church, numerous Romanian cradle Greek-Catholics remained in the Romanian Orthodox Church, at least on paper, and it is unclear how many of these nominal Orthodox members remain crypto-Catholic, especially in northern Transylvania where most Greek Catholics lived (see the maps to the right). Other Greek Catholic Romanians switched to the Latin Church, and now account for the second-largest group in that denomination after Hungarians. The Romanian Church United with Rome is still undergoing a process of recovery from the wounds inflicted by the Communist rulers and the forced merger.

== Current church life ==
=== Ecclesiastical structure ===
Ecclesiastical Province of Fagaras and Alba Iulia

- Romanian Catholic Archeparchy of Fagaraș and Alba Iulia
  - Romanian Catholic Eparchy of Oradea Mare
  - Romanian Catholic Eparchy of Cluj-Gherla
  - Romanian Catholic Eparchy of Lugoj
  - Romanian Catholic Eparchy of Maramureș
  - Romanian Catholic Eparchy of Saint Basil the Great of Bucharest

Immediately subject to the Holy See

- Romanian Catholic Eparchy of St George's in Canton

=== Current hierarchy ===
The present Romanian Greek Catholic episcopate (7 hierarchs as of 15 October 2026) is as follows:

Major archbishop

- Claudiu-Lucian Pop, Major Archbishop of Făgăraș and Alba Iulia (since 2025), also Bishop of Cluj-Gherla (since 2026)

Eparchial bishops

- John Michael Botean, Bishop of St George's in Canton (since 1996)
- Virgil Bercea, Bishop of Oradea Mare (since 1997)
- Vasile Bizău, Bishop of Maramureș (since 2011)
- Mihai Frățilă, Bishop of Saint Basil the Great of Bucharest (since 2014)
- Călin Ioan Bot, Bishop of Lugoj (since 2023)

Auxiliary bishop

- Cristian Dumitru Crișan, Auxiliary Bishop of Făgăraș and Alba Iulia (since 2020), Apostolic Visitor for the Western Europe

Emeritus hierarchs

- None

Pro Oriente estimates that about 1000 Romanian Greek Catholics live in Austria and a similar number in Germany, with 7 parishes and 10 priests in Austria and 7 parishes and 6 priests in Germany.

=== Clergy ===
The vast majority of the Romanian diocesan priests in Romania are married.

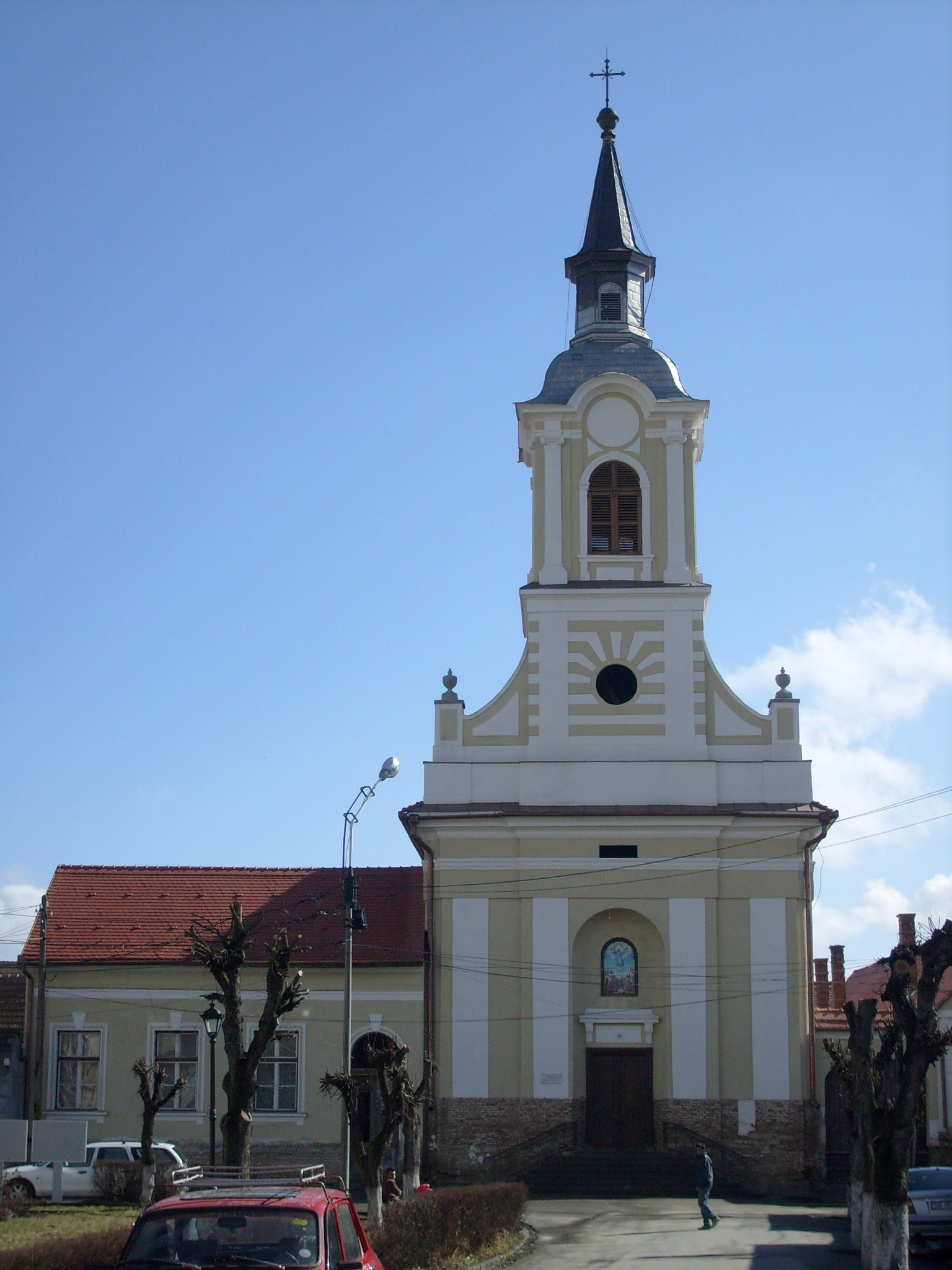
The Greek-Catholic Church in Mediaș, built by bishop Ioan Bob

=== Property issues since the fall of communism ===
Since the fall of communism, church leaders have claimed that the Romanian Greek-Catholic Community is facing a cultural and religious wipe-out: the Greek-Catholic churches are allegedly being destroyed by representatives of the Romanian Orthodox Church, whose actions allegedly enjoy not only the acceptance, but also the support of the Romanian authorities.

== See also ==
- History of Catholicism in Romania
- Catholic Church in Romania
