= Romanian Greek Catholic Major Archeparchy of Făgăraș and Alba Iulia =

Eastern Catholic archeparchy in Romania

Coordinates: 46.1753°N 23.9144°E

Archeparchy of Făgăraș și Alba Iulia Archidioecesis Fagarasiensis et Albae Iuliensis Romenorum Arhieparhia de Făgăraș și Alba Iulia
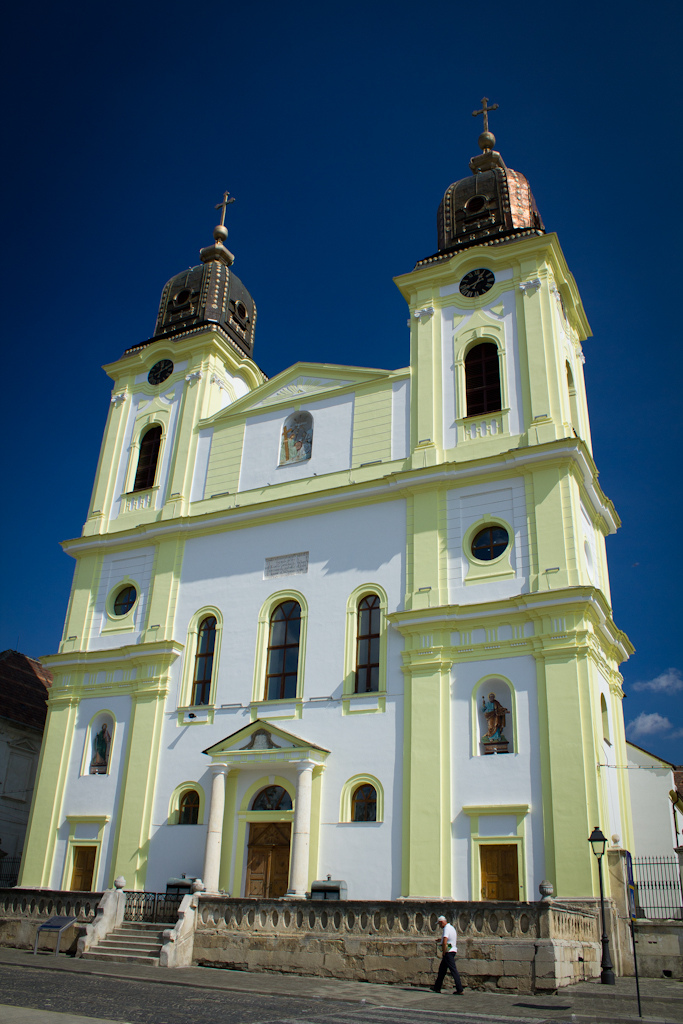
- Sfânta Treime Romanian Catholic Metropolitan Cathedral

Location
- Country: Romania
- Population: (as of 2013); 216,000

Information
- Denomination: Catholic
- Sui iuris church: Romanian Greek Catholic Church
- Rite: Byzantine
- Established: 18 May 1721 (As Eparchy of Făgăraș); 16 November 1854 (As Archeparchy of Făgăraș și Alba Iulia)
- Cathedral: Holy Trinity Metropolitan Cathedral

Current leadership
- Pope: Leo XIV
- Major Archbishop: Claudiu-Lucian Pop
- Suffragans: Cluj-Gherla, Lugoj, Maramureș, Oradea Mare, Bucharest
- Auxiliary Bishops: Cristian Dumitru Crișan

Map
- Church administrative divisions

Website
- www.aegc.ro

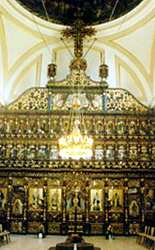
The interior of the Sfânta Treime Romanian Catholic Metropolitan Cathedral

The Archeparchy of Făgăraș and Alba Iulia (Latin: Archidioecesis Fagarasiensis et Albae Iuliensis Romenorum; in Romanian Arhieparhia de Făgăraș și Alba Iulia), is an ecclesiastical territory or archeparchy (equivalent to an archdiocese in the Latin Church) of the Romanian Greek Catholic Church, a particular Eastern Catholic Church, that is located in Romania. The ordinary is the Archeparch of Făgăraș and Alba Iulia who is also the Metropolitan of the ecclesiastical province of Făgăraș and Alba Iulia and the Primate of the Romanian Greek Catholic Church. The incumbent Archeparch is Claudiu-Lucian Pop since November 2025. The cathedral church of the archeparchy is the Cathedral of the Holy Trinity that is situated in the city of Blaj.

There are five suffragan dioceses of the archeparchy in Romania :

- Cluj–Gherla
- Lugoj
- Maramureș
- Oradea Mare
- Saint Basil the Great of Bucharest.

Additionally, in North America, the Romanian Greek Catholic Eparchy of St George is part of the Church but is exempt. The Eparchy of St. George takes part in the Church's synod.

On 18 May 1721 it was established as the Metropolitan Archeparchy of Făgăraș (Latin: Archidioecesis Fagarasiensis Romenorum). On 16 November 1854 it was renamed Metropolitan Archeparchy of Făgăraș and Alba Iulia (Fagarasien(sis) et Albae Iulien(sis) Romenorum in Latin). On 16 December 2005 it was promoted to Major Archeparchy of Făgăraș and Alba Iulia.

== See also ==
- List of Major Archbishops of Făgăraș and Alba Iulia
