= List of Transylvanians =

List of famous Transylvanian personalities

Transylvania

List of famous Transylvanian personalities by era and by birth date. The list contains people who were born or lived in Transylvania.

== 15th century ==
- John Hunyadi, (c.1406–1456), Voivode of Transylvania, Regent of Hungary
- Orban (–1453), Hungarian iron founder and engineer
- Vlad the Impaler (1428/31–1476/77), Prince of Wallachia
- Ladislaus Hunyadi (1431– 1457), Hungarian nobleman
- Matthias Corvinus (1443–1490), King of Hungary

== 15th – 16th century ==
- Stephen Báthory (1477–1534), Voivode of Transylvania
- György Dózsa (1470–1514), Székely nobleman, leader of the peasants' revolt
- Nicolaus Olahus (1493–1568), Romanian-Hungarian writer, Archbishop of Esztergom, Primate of Hungary
- Johannes Honter (1498–1549), Saxon Renaissance humanist and Protestant Reformers

== 16th century ==
- Bálint Bakfark (1507/26–1576), Hungarian composer and lutenist of the Renaissance
- Ferenc Dávid (1520–1579), Hungarian theologian, founder of the Unitarian Church of Transylvania

== 16th – 17th century ==
- Gábor Bethlen, prince of Transylvania
- Stephen Bocskai, Hungarian noble from Transylvania, prince of Transylvania
- Péter Pázmány, Hungarian theologian and writer
- István Szamosközy, Hungarian humanist and historian

== 17th century ==
- János Apáczai Csere, Hungarian writer and educator
- Johannes Caioni, Franciscan friar, the first ethnic Romanian composer

== 17th – 18th century ==
- Kelemen Mikes, Hungarian writer

== 18th – 19th century ==
- Farkas Bolyai, Hungarian mathematician
- Sándor Bölöni Farkas, Hungarian writer
- Sámuel Brassai, Hungarian teacher, musician and artist
- Samuel von Brukenthal, Saxon administrator
- Sándor Kőrösi Csoma, Hungarian explorer and researcher
- Gheorghe Lazăr, Romanian teacher
- Stephan Ludwig Roth, Saxon pedagogue and Lutheran pastor
- Gheorghe Șincai, Romanian historian and pedagogue
- Alexandru Sterca-Șuluțiu, Romanian bishop
- Ioan Sterca-Șuluțiu, 1848 Romanian revolutionary
- Sámuel Teleki, Hungarian Chancellor of Transylvania, founder of the Teleki Library
- Miklós Wesselényi, Hungarian politician and writer

== 19th century ==
- George Bariț, Romanian historian and publicist
- Simion Bărnuțiu, Romanian philosopher and politician
- János Bolyai, Hungarian mathematician
- Carl Filtsch, German pianist
- Áron Gábor, Hungarian revolutionary
- Avram Iancu, Romanian revolutionary
- Zsigmond Kemény, Hungarian author
- Andrei Mureșanu, Romanian poet and revolutionary
- Balázs Orbán, Hungarian writer, historian and politician

== 19th – 20th century ==
- Arthur Arz von Straussenburg, Saxon soldier, last military leader of the Austro-Hungarian Army
- Miklós Bánffy, Hungarian nobleman, politician, and novelist.
- Béla Bartók, Hungarian composer
- Elek Benedek, Hungarian journalist and writer
- István Bethlen, was a Hungarian aristocrat, statesman, Prime Minister from 1921 to 1931.
- Lucian Blaga, Romanian poet, playwright, and philosopher
- Alexandru Borza, Romanian botanist
- Miklós Bródy, Hungarian chess master
- Badea Cârțan, Romanian explorer
- Octavian Codru Tăslăuanu, Romanian writer and soldier (first in the Austro-Hungarian Army and then in the Romanian Army)
- George Coșbuc, Romanian poet
- Aron Cotruș, Romanian poet and politician
- Miron Cristea, Romanian Prime Minister and Patriarch of All Romania
- Nicolae Densuşianu, Romanian historian and ethnologist
- Octavian Goga, Romanian poet and politician
- Petru Groza, Romanian politician
- Iuliu Hossu, Romanian bishop, cardinal
- Ștefan Octavian Iosif, Romanian poet
- Elek Köblös, Hungarian ethnic Romanian politician
- Károly Kós, Hungarian architect, writer and politician
- Vasile Luca, Romanian ethnic Hungarian politician
- Áron Márton, Hungarian Catholic bishop, anticommunist dissident
- Traian Moșoiu, Romanian general and politician
- Franz Nopcsa, Austrian-Hungarian paleontologist
- József Nyírő, Hungarian writer
- Hermann Oberth, Saxon inventor and physicist
- Aurel Popovici, Romanian federalist
- Sextil Pușcariu, Romanian linguist and philologist
- Emil Rebreanu, ethnic-Romanian Austro-Hungarian Army officer
- Liviu Rebreanu, Romanian novelist
- Ilie Șteflea, Romanian Army Corps General and Chief of the Romanian General Staff for most of Romania's involvement in World War II
- Vasile Suciu, Romanian bishop
- Áron Tamási, Hungarian writer
- Sámuel Teleki, Austrian-Hungarian explorer
- Alexandru Vaida-Voevod, Romanian politician
- Aurel Vlaicu, Romanian aviation pioneer

== 20th century ==
- Emil Cioran, Romanian essayist and philosopher
- Ion Moța, Romanian politician and volunteer soldier, deputy leader of the Iron Guard killed during the Spanish Civil War
- László Rajk, Hungarian politician
- Ion Rațiu, Romanian politician
- Horia Sima, leader of the Iron Guard and co-leader of the National Legionary State
- Ioan Suciu, Romanian bishop
- Sándor Veress, Hungarian composer
- Albert Wass, Hungarian writer

== 20–21st century ==
- Ilinca Băcilă, Romanian singer/yodeller. Representative of Romania at the Eurovision Song Contest 2017, alongside Alex Florea.
- Albert-László Barabási, Hungarian physicist
- Oana Ban, Romanian Olympic gold medal gymnast
- László Bölöni, Romanian ethnic Hungarian football manager
- Victor Ciorbea, Romanian jurist, Romanian Ombudsman, ex-Prime Minister of Romania
- Andrei Codrescu, Romanian-American writer
- Dumitru Fărcaș, Romanian tárogató (taragot) player
- Gheorghe Funar, Romanian politician
- Zsolt Erőss (1968–2013), Hungarian high-altitude mountaineer
- Gabriela Irimia, Romanian pop singer, popular in Britain, see Cheeky Girls
- Monica Irimia, Romanian pop singer, popular in Britain, see Cheeky Girls
- Sándor Kányádi, poet and translator
- Béla and Marta Károlyi, Romanian-American gymnastics coaches
- György Ligeti, Hungarian composer
- Béla Markó, Romanian ethnic Hungarian politician
- Gabriela and Mihaela Modorcea, twins sisters comprising the duo Indiggo
- Gheorghe Mureșan, Romanian basketball player
- Octavian Paler, Romanian essayist
- Florin Piersic, Romanian actor
- Dumitru Prunariu, Romanian cosmonaut
- András Sütő, Hungarian writer
- Gabriela Szabo, Romanian athlete
- Alexandru Todea, Romanian bishop, cardinal
- László Tőkés, Hungarian bishop

== See also ==
- History of Transylvania
  - Demographic history of Transylvania
