= Șuluțiu =

Șuluțiu is a Romanian surname. Notable people with the surname include:

- Octav Șuluțiu (1909–1949), Romanian prose writer and literary critic

== See also ==
- Sterca-Șuluțiu, two ethnic Romanian Transylvanian brothers
