= Étienne Hajdú =

Hungarian-born French sculptor

- István Hajdú
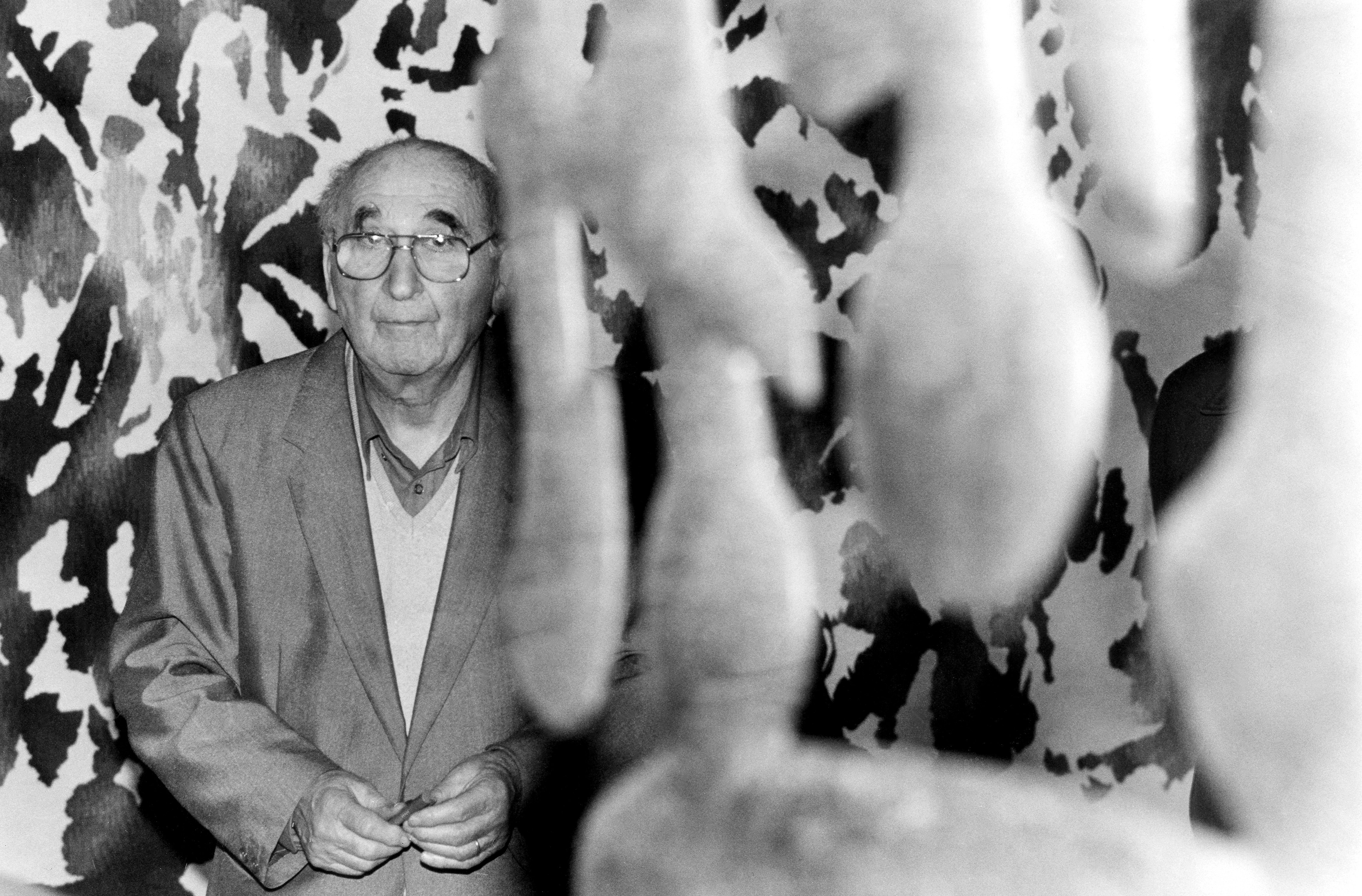
- Born: August 12, 1907; Torda, Torda-Aranyos County, Transylvania, Kingdom of Hungary
- Died: March 24, 1996 (aged 88); Bagneux, Hauts-de-Seine
- Known for: Part of the Hungarian circle of artists and writers
- Movement: Résistance

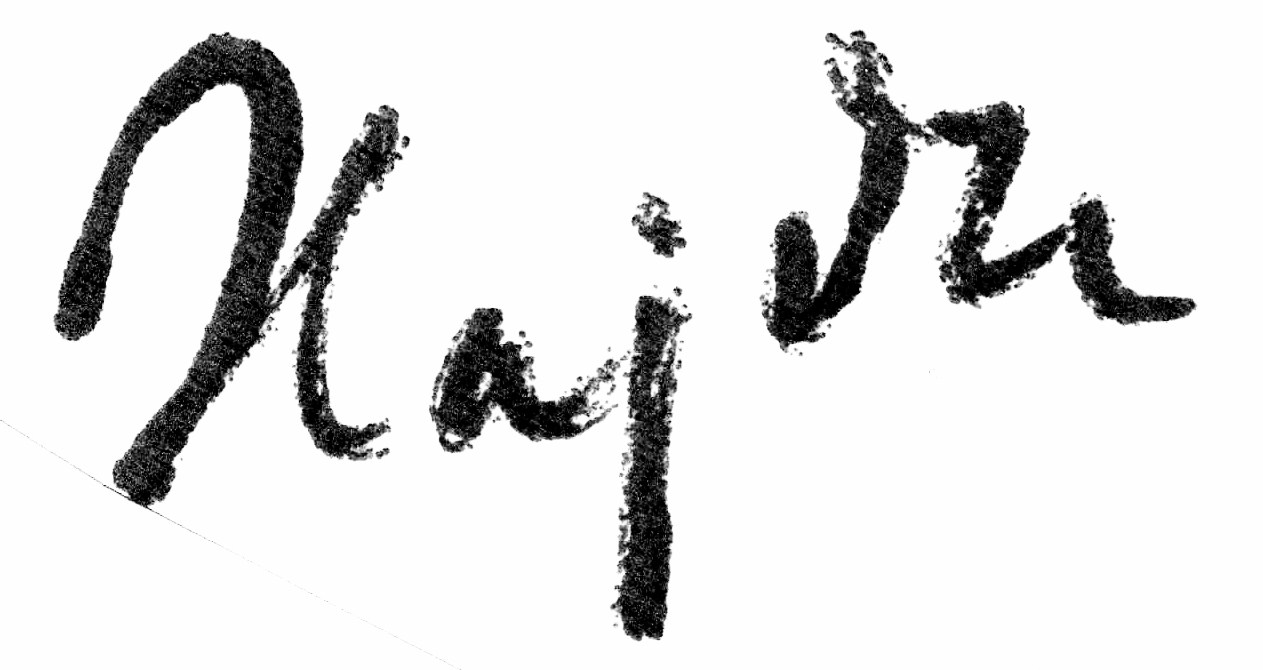
Hajdú's signature

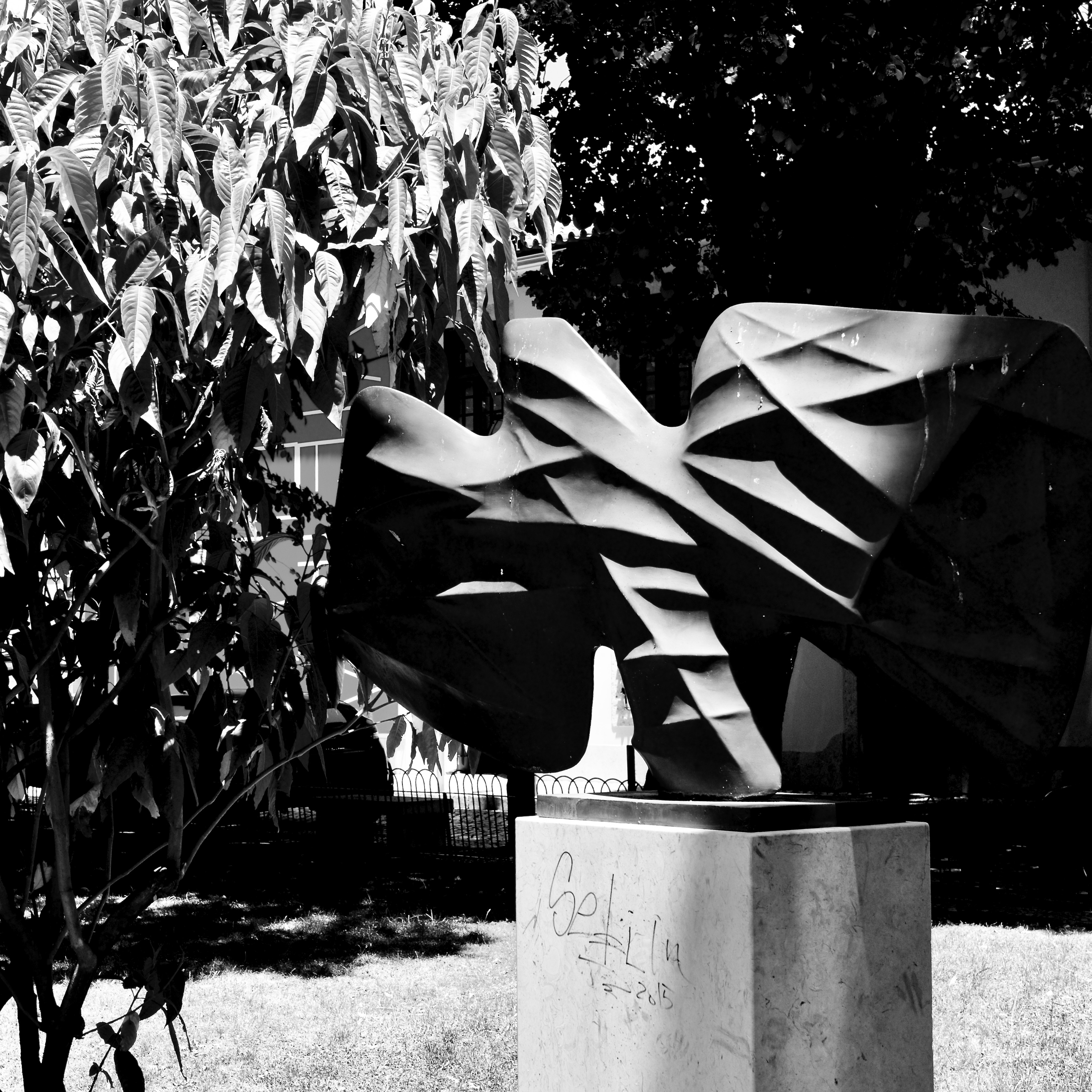
Ouranos II, artwork located at Amoreiras Garden, in Lisbon.

Étienne Hajdú (born István Hajdú; 12 August 1907 – 24 March 1996) was a Hungarian-born French sculptor of Jewish descent. After emigration to Paris in the 1930s, he became part of the Hungarian circle of artists and writers. He fought in the French Resistance during World War II.

== Early life and education ==
Istvan Hadju was born in 1907 to a Jewish family in Torda, Torda-Aranyos County, Transylvania, Kingdom of Hungary (now Turda, Cluj County, Romania).

== Career ==
He emigrated to Paris in the 1930s and became part of the Hungarian artistic circle there.

=== World War II ===
After the Fall of France, Hajdu became active in the Résistance movement. Numerous Jewish Hungarians, most of them artists and writers, were part of the Résistance. Many carried out their actions outside Paris, as foreigners had been formally evacuated with the outbreak of war in September 1939.

== Death ==
Hajdú died in Bagneux, Hauts-de-Seine.
