= Sterca-Șuluțiu =

Sterca-Şuluţiu is a compound Romanian name associated with a notable family from Transylvania, particularly active during the 19th century. The family played significant roles in religious leadership, national movements, and historical scholarship during a transformative period in Romanian history. While the exact etymology of "Sterca-Șuluțiu" is not definitively established, the surname is primarily found in Romania, especially in Alba County.

== Notable figures ==
- Alexandru Sterca-Șuluțiu (1794–1867), Greek-Catholic bishop
- Ioan Sterca-Șuluțiu (1796–1858), 1848 revolutionary
- Dionisie Sterca-Șuluțiu (1825–1897), jurist, revolutionary, and philanthropist
- Iosif Sterca-Șuluțiu (1827–1911), historian and jurist
