= Ioan Buteanu =

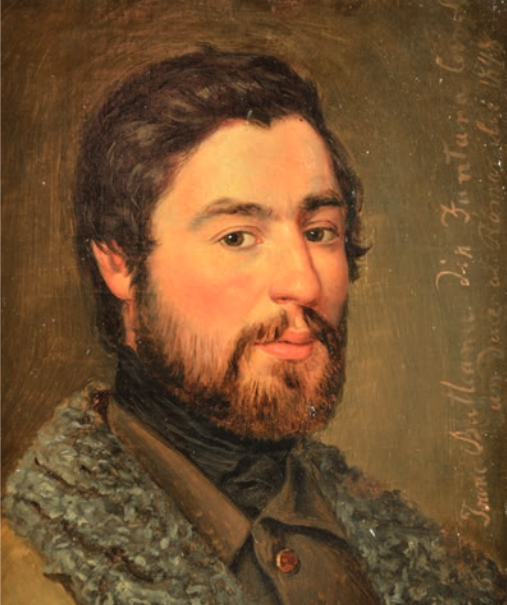
- Born: 1821
- Died: May 23, 1849 (aged 27–28); Principality of Transylvania, Austrian Empire
- Occupations: lawyer; prefect of Zarand; revolutionary leader
- Known for: tribunal of the Auraria Gemina Legion in the Revolution of 1848

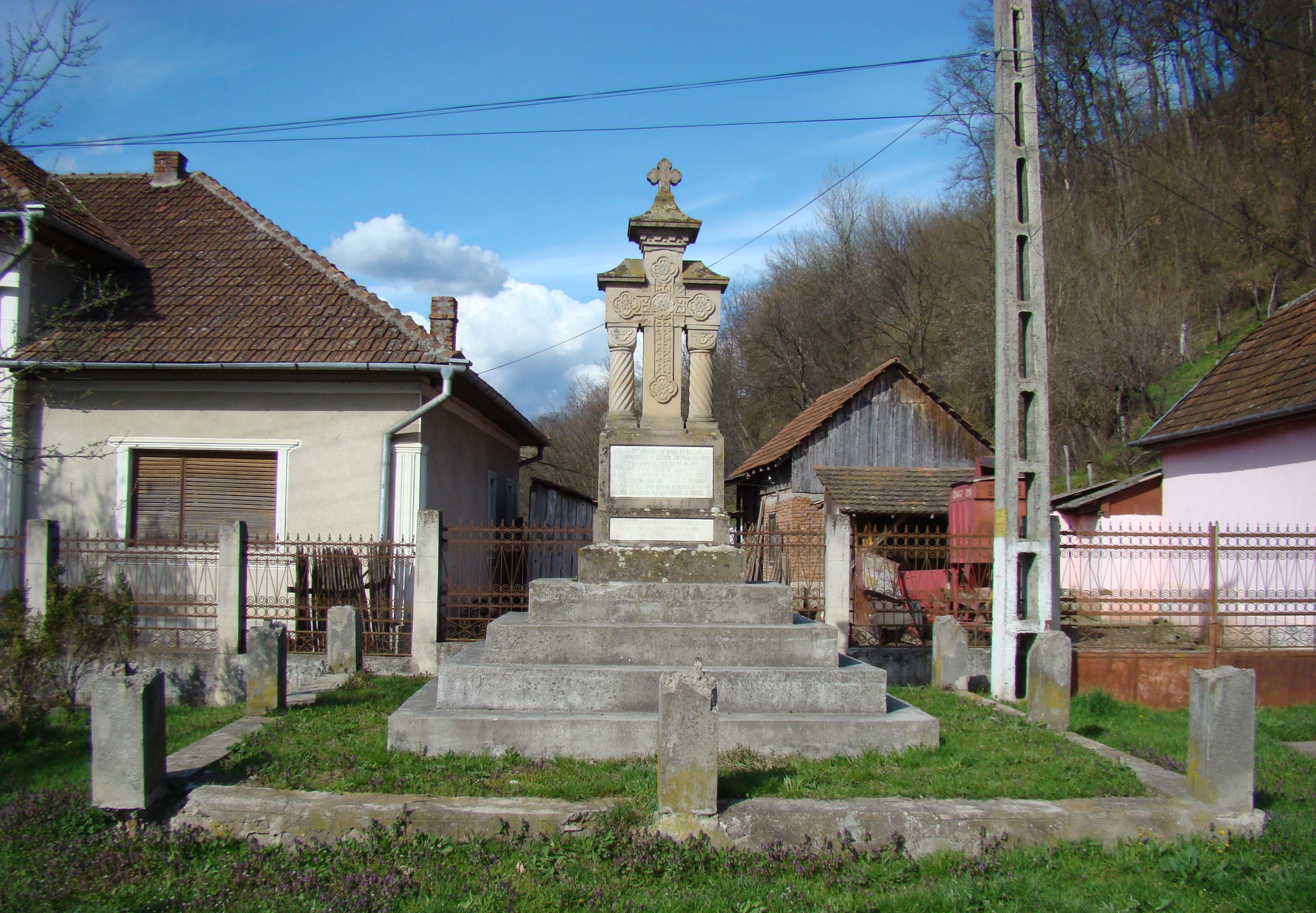
The monument of Ioan Buteanu in Gurahonț, built in 1934

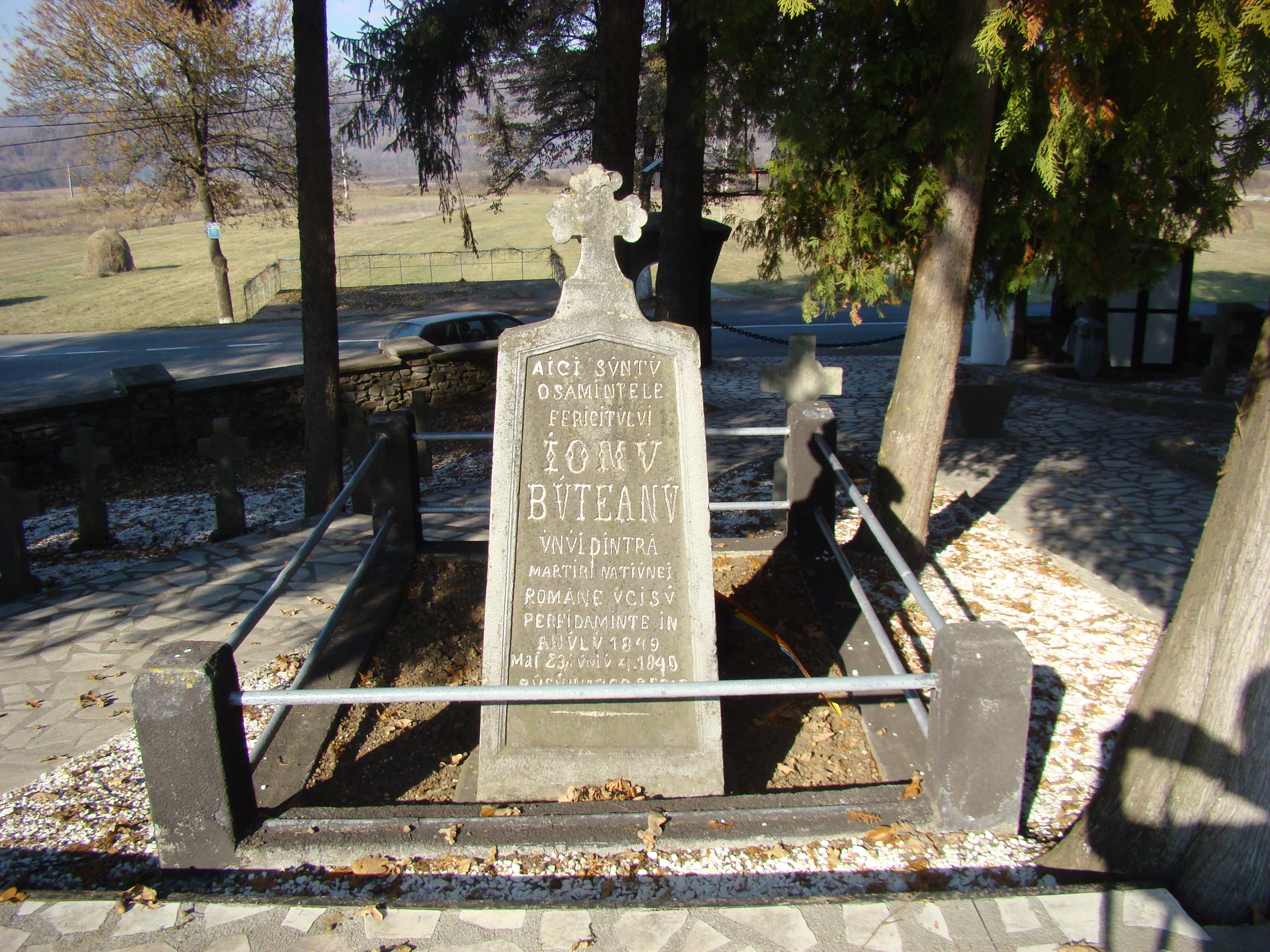
The tomb of Ioan Buteanu from Țebea

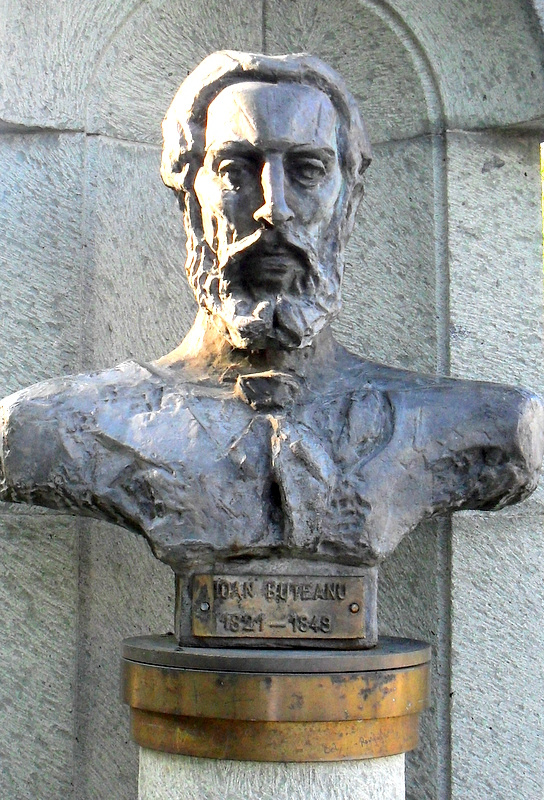
Bust of Ioan Buteanu in Baia Mare

Ioan Buteanu (1821–23 May 1849) was a leader of the Transylvanian Romanian Revolutionaries in 1848 and a prefect of Zaránd County between 1848 and 1849.

== Early life and activity ==
Ioan Buteanu was born in 1821 to a noble family. His birthplace is sometimes listed as Sighetu Marmației or Șomcuta Mare, where his father was born. He attended gymnasium in Baia Mare and Carei. He was a Chancellor for three years at Tabula Regia in Târgu Mureș (the Transylvanian Court of Appeals). After obtaining a lawyer's diploma he settled in Abrud. Austrian General Anton Puchner appointed him as the administrator of Zarand, and the Romanian National Committee appointed him prefect in that region.

On May 15, 1848, he gave a speech at the Blaj Assembly, criticizing the intent of the Hungarian revolutionaries to unify Transylvania with Hungary.

Located in Sibiu in the summer of 1848, he received an invitation from Nicolae Bălcescu, asking him to join the Wallachian Revolution. Buteanu asked Avram Iancu to advocate in the National Committee to take action "to help the brothers beyond."

During the 1849 truce between the Hungarian revolutionaries and the Transylvanian Romanians led by Avram Iancu, on May 6, the major adventurer Imre Hatvani with a detachment of Hungarian revolutionaries surprised and disarmed the Romanians in Abrud. On May 7, the prefects Petru Dobra and Ioan Buteanu were taken as prisoners. Dobra was shot at Abrud, and Buteanu was sent to Brad and jailed. On May 19, Major Hatvani withdrew from Abrud to Brad, then through Baia de Criș and Hălmagiu to Gurahonț. Hatvani hanged Buteanu without trial on 23 May 1849 at Josesel.

== Legacy ==
Buteanu was painted by Barbu Iscovescu when he was held prisoner alongside other Wallachian revolutionaries in the Apuseni Mountains.

On May 23, 1999, the Pro-Maramureș Cultural Society "Dragoș Vodă" built a bust in the center of Sighet to commemorate the 150 year anniversary of the death of Buteanu. On the Memorial House, now a place of worship, a commemorative plaque was placed.

The Gurahonț High School in Arad County is named after Buteanu.

His name was also worn by the 6th Regiment of Turda, a regiment commanded between 1972 and 1976 by Ștefan Gușă.

== Bibliography ==
- Traian Mager, Ținutul Hălmagiului, a monography in 4 volumes, Arad: The Diecean Typography, 1937
- Silviu Dragomir, Ioan Buteanu, The Zarand Prefect in the years 1848–49, Bucharest, 1928.
- Silviu Dragomir, Ioan Buteanu, Prefect of Zarand in the years 1848-49, Bucharest, 1928. Silviu Dragomir, Ioan Buteanu, Prefect of Zarand in the years 1848-49, 2nd edition, coordinated and completed by Vasile Iuga of Săliște, "Dragoș Vodă" Publishing House, 2012.
