= Demographic history of Transylvania =

There is an ongoing scholarly debate among Hungarian and Romanian historians regarding the medieval population of Transylvania. While some Romanian historians claim there was a continuous Romanian majority, Hungarian historians argue that Romanians continuously settled in the Kingdom of Hungary, of which Transylvania was a part.

== Demographics and historical research ==
=== 3rd to 8th century ===
Romanian historian Ioan-Aurel Pop estimates as many as 800,000 people living in Roman Dacia by the 3rd century, and doubts the newly formed province south of the Danube could have absorbed such a large population. Romanian historian Marian Țiplic claims that the population of Transylvania during the Roman administration was estimated about 300,000 inhabitants, which number based on the comparison with the European average during the Roman period and the size of Transylvania which is 60,000 km^{2}. Higher estimations are exaggerations, because Transylvania had about 300,000 inhabitants in the beginning of 14th century.

Napoca continued to be inhabited for a period of time after the Roman administration withdrawal. The main evidence comes from two cemeteries to the south and southeast of the town containing brick and mortar or stone sarcophagi, the deceased being buried then according to Roman customs. Villages did spring up on the nearby countryside which displayed continuation in culture from the Roman period, likely populated by settlers that had abandoned the city.

Although the monetary finds over the period between 265 and 325 are scarce, Porolissum continued to be sporadically inhabited until late the 4th century, the inhabitants even trading with the Roman Empire. According to other studies the modifications from after 271 CE, such as walling of the space between columns in the interior of the forum and the addition of three water basins constructed with crude masonry, show that a thriving community continued to inhabit the site.

After the abandonment of Dacia, the population of Sarmizegetusa Regia reduced drastically. A small community moved inside the amphitheatre, walling the entrances with funerary stones and surviving until the end of the 4th century.

According to Hungarian historiography, Latin-speaking people north of the Danube did not remain. Priscus, 5th-century Eastern Roman diplomat and historian described his journey to Attila, he wrote that the people in the "land of the Huns" understood only Goth (Germanic) and Scythian (Hunnic) language.

According to Victor Friedman, nationalist historians often use one of two different historical interpretations to support present-day territorial or indigenous claims to Transylvania. Hungarian narratives regarding Transylvania assume that the Romans completely withdrew from Dacia, whereas Romanian narratives maintain that Romance continued to be spoken by Romanized Dacians.

Most Romanian historians claim a continuous Romanian presence in Transylvania since the Roman colonization of Dacia in the 2nd century. According to them, the Romans brought settlers from various parts of the Empire, who intermarried with the local Dacian population and gradually Romanized it, creating the Daco-Roman people, the ancestors of the modern Romanians. After the Roman withdrawal from the province between 271 and 275, Transylvania became a gateway for successive invaders, while the Daco-Romans took refuge in the mountains and preserved their Latin heritage. This explanation of the Romanian presence in Transylvania is referred to as the Daco-Roman continuity theory. According to Dennis Deletant, the term theory is justified due to the lack of convincing archaeological and historical evidence supporting it, and the claim remains open to question. Hungarian historians reject the Daco-Roman continuity theory, arguing that when the Romans withdrew from Dacia, its inhabitants left with them, and that by the time the Magyars entered the Carpathian Basin at the end of the 9th century, Transylvania was inhabited only by Slavic tribes. They cite the predominance of Slavic place names and note that the first recorded mention of Vlachs (Romanians), in the documents of the Hungarian chancery appears only in a charter from 1222. According to Dennis Deletant, the other inhabitants of Transylvania remain largely obscure, as the earliest documents concerning the province date only from the 12th century. According to Hungarian historians, the Romanian population in Transylvania is thought to have originated from immigration south of the Carpathians at the end of the 12th century, when Romanian shepherds were granted permission by the Hungarian kings to settle in the region.

=== 9th to 15th century ===
According to Hungarian historiography, the analysis of the Transylvanian river names is confirmed by archaeological finds, showing that the Hungarians who settled in Transylvania during the 10th century encountered Slavs throughout the region, with the exception of a small Turkic group in the southeast, near Küküllő (Rom. Târnava) and Olt (Rom. Olt) rivers. The absence of Romanian-derived river-names confirms that the Romanians arrived after the Slavs, Hungarians, and Germans. The Romanians borrowed river-names from the Slavs, Hungarians and Germans. The ancient Transylvanian river names were adopted into Romanian through the linguistic mediation of the Slavs, Hungarians, or Germans.

According to a prominent view in Romanian historiography, the uninterrupted presence of a Romanized population in Transylvania is proven by archaeological evidence, including artefacts bearing Christian symbolism, hoards of bronze Roman coins and Roman-style pottery. According to Ioan-Aurel Pop, the apparent absence of Romanian-derived names was caused by a gradual mistranslation of notaries who did not know Romanian, leading to Romanian being written in corrupt but easily identifiable forms, such as Kapreuar (Căprioara), Nuksora (Nucșoara) or Chernyswara (Cernișoara). Also, the preservation of river names from Antiquity until today suggests those names were uninterruptedly transmitted from the Dacians to the Romans, and then to the Daco-Romans. Some rivers names, such the development of Criș from ancient Crisius would be in line with the phonetical evolution of Romanian. Although Transylvanian toponyms transmitted from Antiquity are scarce, they are relevant due to their geographical importance (Carpathians, Danube) with large rivers and mountains generally keeping their ancient toponyms, and smaller ones gradually losing their original names as a consequence of the Hungarian rule over Transylvania which would prioritize their naming conventions. The invariable adoption of the Slavic names by the Romanians for settlements bearing parallel Hungarian, German and Slavic names shows that the Romanians lived side by side with the Slavs for a long enough time, before the arrival of the Hungarians. The research of Transylvanian toponyms is a complex endeavour that could cause certain errors as the Hungarian and German toponyms are easier to distinguish while a Romanian toponym may as well be dismissed as a Latin or Slavic toponym due to Romanian being a Latin-based language with Slavic influences, being impossible to differentiate between toponyms made by the people speaking a certain language and toponyms created by another people such as the Romanians with foreign elements adopted from the Slavs. Another issue is that the recorded documents were written in Slavic and Hungarian during the Middle Ages, which have a tendency to slavicize or magyarize names, leading to Slavic or Hungarian names that are not genuine.

According to Hungarian historiography, the presence of Slavs is confirmed by archaeology, but no distinctive trace of Romanians had been found in Transylvania at the time of the Hungarian conquest.

The occurrence of Early Slavs in the region (by some historians as early as the second half of the 6th century) followed two general directions: one from the south, along the Olt river valley, and one from the north-west (upper Tisza) along the Crasna river valley. No evidence has been found to sustain a movement along the Mureș valley as well during this time. A third direction of entry was noted after the second half of the 7th century from the north-east. Historian Tudor Sălăgean views the presence of Slavs as questionable as the sudden disappearance of the Transylvanian Slavs cannot be explained, it is more likely that a considerable percentage were Romanians with their Slavic influences.

According to Florin Curta, no indication of a migration in the 10th century from the south to the north of the Danube have been found. Many sites excavated from the 10th century in the region of Romania show signs of being built in the previous 100 or 200 years, while in those that were started in the 10th century the ceramic is no different than what was previously used in the region, and most of the animal bones discovered were from horned cattle and pigs, not sheep or goats which are usually associated with transhumant herding.

According to Romanian-German archeologist Kurt Horedt, based on the funerary rite and rituals, Transylvania was multiethnic in the period of 9th to 12th centuries, being inhabited by several cultural groups:

- Blandiana A or Dridu – Alba Iulia: pre-Christian South-Danubian influence;
- Ciumbrud: possible South-Danubian Christian influence;
- Cluj: early Magyars;
- Blandiana B - Alba Iulia–Orăştie-Dealul Pemilor X2: Central European influence, mixed Christian and Pagan population;
- Citfalău: mixed Hungarian-Romanian Christian population.

Romanian archeologist Ioan Marian Țiplic considers that the graves dated to the end of the 9th century and beginning of the 10th which belong to the Blandiana A and the Ciumbrud cultural groups, represent the last stage in the ethnogenesis of the Romanian people. In addition, Romanian archeologist Gheorghe Baltag, based on his research at the Albeşti site in Mureş County, defined "the culture of the Transylvanian highland", referring to a possible indigenous culture in higher areas (over 600m and up to 900-1000m) between the 8th and 10th centuries.

According to Martyn Rady, the sources before the 13th century do not contain references to Vlachs (Romanians) anywhere in Hungary and Transylvania or in Wallachia. The sources describe Wallachia as a largely uninhabited forest until that time. There can be little doubt that a Romanian population lived in the region, although it is impossible to determine its size. In Hunyad county, linguistic evidence suggests a Romanian presence from at least the 11th century. It is, however, conceivable that the sudden appearance of Vlachs in the Hungarian historical record around 1200 was due to Romanian immigration from the Balkans, as it is universally maintained by Hungarian historians, or show the new political significance assigned to the Romanian chieftains of Transylvania and the Lower Danube, making their presence worthy of record for the first time. The response of the Hungarian kings to the settlement of Vlachs and Cumans on the Lower Danube shows how seriously they viewed it, the first action of Hungarian rulers being the establishment of a bishopric for that region and urging the Pope to send missions aimed to convert the newcomers from paganism and from the Orthodox rite.

According to Jean W. Sedlar, it cannot be ascertained from any extant documentary evidence how many Vlachs (Romanians) may have resided in Transylvania in the 11th century. The actual number of persons belonging to nationalities is at best guesswork, the Vlachs may have comprised two-thirds of Transylvania's population in 1241 on the eve of the Mongol invasion. Hungarian and Romanian historians attempted to prove that their ancestors were the first who settled in Transylvania. Romanians regard themselves as descendants of the tribes of Dacia intermingles with Roman settlers who allegedly have resided continuously in Transylvania. Hungarians claim that the Vlach population entered Transylvania from the Balkans only in the 12th century, this argument is supported by the origin of some Transylvanian place names from the time of the great Slavic migrations and by several Balkan influences on the Romanian language.

Peter Jordan claims that already in the 13th century there must have been enough Transylvanian Romanians to populate Moldova and Wallachia by emigration right after their devastation by the Mongols and to give these regions a distinct Romanian character.

The Regestrum Varadinense is a record of the trials that took place between 1208 and 1235 containing 711 place-names and 2500 personal names. According to Hungarian historians, it doesn't mention Romanian ones, while Romanian historians find certain personal names like Fichur (Fecior), Qrud (Crudu) and Qucus (Cucu).

During the Mongol invasion of Hungary (1241–1242), the advancing Mongol forces killed not only armed resistance but also large numbers of civilians, contributing to widespread devastation. The Transylvanian region of the Kingdom of Hungary was heavily affected and presented a devastated landscape following the Mongol withdrawal. Some inhabitants survived by fleeing to forests or remote mountainous areas. The population had been severely reduced by slaughter, famine, and the large number of captives taken by the Mongols. Master Roger, canon of Nagyvárad and a survivor of the invasion, wrote an eyewitness account describing the destruction. He reported traveling for several days along the Mureș Valley without encountering any living person. During his journey, Gyulafehérvár (now Alba Iulia, Romania), formerly a political and ecclesiastical center of a prosperous region, was found in ruins, with destroyed churches and buildings and human remains scattered throughout the area. Gradually, survivors returned and began rebuilding the devastated settlements. Nevertheless, years later the bishops of Transylvania continued to report significant depopulation within their diocese, noting that only a small number of people lived on the episcopal estates. In 1246, Béla IV of Hungary granted privileges at the request of Gallus, Bishop of Transylvania, aiming to support repopulation efforts in areas that had been depopulated or left largely uninhabited. Similarly, in 1282, Ladislaus IV of Hungary confirmed privileges in response to petitions from Peter, Bishop of Transylvania, also intended to encourage settlement.

In Hungarian historiography, an important consequence of the devastating Mongol invasion was large-scale immigration by Romanians. Hungarian kings invited Romanian shepherds into the fortress districts, including those moving northward from Bulgaria and Serbia, as well as others who were permitted to migrate after the collapse of Cumanian rule, this is how some Romanians ended up settling in the areas surrounding the Transylvanian castles. A much larger number of Romanians settled not in Transylvania itself, but on the far side of its western mountain boundary, toward the Great Hungarian Plain, on royal castle estates. The immigration of Romanians did not occur all at once, the settlement process in the mountain districts extended over several centuries, the settlement was organized and supported by various incentives.

In Hungarian historiography, the number of Romanians was small at the end of the 13th century in the Kingdom of Hungary. The appearance of Romanians on private estates was sporadic in the Southern Carpathians and in the southern part of the mid-Transylvanian mountains. Before 1300, in districts of Eastern Hungary, the contemporary sources mention around a 1000 Hungarian and Saxon villages, but only 6 clearly Romanian villages, but 5 of these (Enyed, Fenes, Fülesd, Illye, Szád) had Hungarian derived names, the name of Oláhtelek reveals that it was established in a Hungarian environment. At that time, the royal power declined at the expense of the aristocracy and the Church and more Romanians were unlawfully placed on private properties. In 1293, according to the provision of King Andrew III of Hungary, all Vlachs staying on the estates of nobles and others except 60 Vlach families needed to relocate even by force to the royal estate called Székes where they enjoyed a full tax exemption. Thus those Romanian families could grow and multiply without any burden, both financially and numerically. According to the area of Székes estate and the amount of the donated lands for each family, according to the estimation of Árpád Kosztin, this corresponded 3600 families which meant 16,000–18,000 Romanians, and at that time, all Transylvanian Romanians could be settled on only one royal estate. Which corresponds the naming of the first settlement with the "oláh" word in the Kingdom of Hungary: Oláhtelek (meaning Vlach-site in Hungarian) in Bihar county from 1238.

The list of Papal Tithes from 1332–1337 is the most important historical source for the ecclesiastical topography of medieval Kingdom of Hungary. According to this register the population of Transylvania was 330,720 around 1330. It gives an important data about to the ethnic and religious division of the peoples living in medieval Transylvania during the reign of King Charles Robert of Hungary. At that time, according to list of Papal Tithes 310,000 (Catholic) Hungarians, 21,000 (Catholic) Saxons and 18,000 (Orthodox) Romanians lived in Transylvania.

Transylvanian place-names were investigated by István Kniezsa, a Hungarian linguist and Slavist. Until 1350, a total of 1,331 settlement names in the broad sense of Transylvania appear in sources that still exist today. Out of these 1,331 settlement names, 1,069 are Hungarian origin and 39 are Romanian origin. (The other place names are of Slavic or German origin.) Until the middle of the 14th century, 80.3% of the names of the settlements existing today are Hungarian origin, and 2.9% are of Romanian origin. Among these settlement names of Romanian origin, in the list of Papal Tithes from 1332–1337, there is only one settlement mentioned in the source as Romanian: Căprioara (Kaprevár in Hungarian), this Romanian place-name is the very first recorded Romanian toponym in the Kingdom of Hungary, including Transylvania. Romanian linguist and Slavist Emil Petrovici finds that settlement names of Romanian-Slavic origin are more commonly found in places which Kniezsa indicates as only densely forested areas. Petrovici theorizes a retreat of the Romanian and Slavic population to hardly accessible areas during the Hungarian conquest of the Carpathian Basin, where several place-names derive. Petrovici identifies certain Hungarian place-names' origin differently. He views them as either Romanian-originated or Slavic-originated, but came to Hungarian through Romanian.

The majority of the data about Romanians in Transylvania comes from the decades after the papal tithe list. In the document archive from the Kingdom of Hungary, there are 42 documents referring to Romanians between 1222 and 1331, and 439 documents between 1333 and 1400. According to Hungarian historiography, this corresponds to the fact that the Romanians gradually migrated to the Carpathian Basin, and a very significant phase of their immigration occurred only in the second half of the 14th century and also in the 15th century, and the gradually Romanian immigration to Transylvania is also clear from the place names.

Transylvanian settlements and the origin of their names (according to Hungarian historiography):
Time frame	Number of Transylvanian settlements still existing today	Name of Hungarian origin	Name of Romanian origin
Settlements in the sources until 1300	511	428 (83.8%)	3 (0.6%)
New settlements in the sources between 1301 and 1350	820	641 (78.2%)	36 (4.4%)
New settlements in the sources between 1351 and 1400	426	286 (67.1%)	37 (8.7%)
Total Transylvanian settlements until 1400	1757	1355 (77.1%)	76 (4.3%)

Romanian historian Ioan-Aurel Pop holds a different view on this subject. Pop claims the papal tithes confirm the existence of 954 localities with Catholic parishes, out of his estimated 2100–2200 settlements existing in Transylvania during that time, meaning that the villages with Catholic parishes represented 43–45% of all Transylvanian settlements, and the Catholic population could have represented between 34 and 40%, while the Romanian Orthodox population represented about 65% of the entire population. Romanian historian Viorel Achim claims that in the 14th century, including at the time of Louis I, those belonging to the Orthodox Church in the Kingdom of Hungary were mostly exempted from paying the tithes. There were attempts by the Hungarian Catholic church to impose the tithes on the Orthodox population more vigorously, but those managed to be successful during Sigismund's reign.

According to Ștefan Pascu, the first documented mention of settlements in Transylvania and Partium can be also related to the expansion of the feudal institutions, thus distinguishing between newly enstanblished settlements and older ones that were only recorded for the first time in a certain year can be very difficult, if not impossible. The percentage of settlements mentioned before the year 1350 varies substantially between counties, as well as among different districts and seats, and even between plain areas and highlands of the same county, district or seat. In the Székely Land, around 90% of the settlements mentioned before 1350 do not appear in any known records earlier than the list of Papal Tithes from 1332–1337, while the percentage goes down to 24% in the Districts of Brassó and Beszterce and to 12% in the other Saxon Seats. Those differences reflect the distinct penetration of the feudal rule in the Székely and Saxon societies. The late expansion of the feudal institutions is also the reason why in districts such as Amlaș (Omlás), Făgăraș (Fogaras), Năsăud (Naszód), Chioar (Kővár) and Crasna (Kraszna), where Romanians formed the majority of the population, only 24% of the settlements were mentioned before 1350.

Romanian historian Ștefan Pascu estimated the population of Transylvania based on the List of Papal Tithes. In the 1960s, he estimated 500,000 inhabitants, with 40% Catholic population and 1,100 Catholic churches. Later, in the 1980s, he revised his estimate to 900,000 inhabitants, with 35% Catholic population and 950 Catholic churches. According to Hungarian historiography, Pascu's works contain serious methodological flaws and a number of factual errors. The purpose of his population estimates was to support the Daco-Roman continuity theory, which Pascu briefly summarizes in his work: "The native Romanians were in a clear majority at all times in Transylvania, compared with the Hungarians and Székelys who arrived at the end of the 11th century, and the Saxons who settled in the 12th century". According to Hungarian historian Gyula Kristó, contrary to its intended purpose, Pascu's work actually provides effective counter-arguments for opponents of the theory. According to Hungarian historiography, the total population of the Kingdom of Hungary at the time of the List of Papal Tithes (1332–1337) was around 2 million. This suggests that Pascu's estimates for Transylvania are highly exaggerated, as Transylvania could not have represented 45% of the kingdom's total population. It is also unrealistic to estimate the population of the entire Kingdom of Hungary at that time as 3.6 million based on Pascu's proportion for Transylvania. Kristó notes that Hungarian researchers examined all the linguistic and settlement-related traces of the Romanian population in Hungary up to 1400. According to their findings, 16.4% of the villages in broader Transylvania had Romanian or partially Romanian populations at that time. Kristó argues that it is impossible for more than 65% of the total population in eastern Hungary to have been Romanian around 1332–1337. He also criticizes Pascu for assigning residents of the Orthodox faith to every settlement without a church and for ignoring the numerous villages of mixed ethnicity. The List of Papal Tithes shows that in the entire Kingdom of Hungary, not just Transylvania, only some villages had a church. In many western counties, 60–70% of the villages lacked a church, even though they contained no Romanian population and were far from areas settled by Romanians. Even in the 1330s, some regions had ten villages sharing a single church, showing that the absence of a parish was not primarily related to the presence of the Orthodox faith. Kristó considers it a methodological error to assume that Hungarians lived only in settlements with a Catholic church. Hungarian historian György Györffy also criticized Pascu’s estimates, noting that using such a method could lead to the conclusion that 60% of Poland's villages were inhabited by an Orthodox population.

In a letter from 1356, Pope Innocent VI strengthened a previous bull addressed to the prior of the Dominican Order of Hungary, where he was instructed to preach the crusade "against all the inhabitants of Transylvania, Bosnia and Slavonia, which are heretics" (contra omnes Transilvanos, Bosnenses et Sclavonie, qui heretici fuerint). Pop says if Transylvania was heretical in the pope's view, a term which could also be used for Orthodox people by Catholics, the region had an overwhelming non-Hungarian majority.

According to Romanian historians Ioan Bolovan and Sorina-Paula Bolovan, the majority of the Transylvanian population in 1288 at the first national assembly in Transylvania during the rule of Transylvanian Voievode Roland Borsa was Romanian, and that in 1366 when the Romanians became more marginalized as the noble status depended on adopting Catholicism but still remained the ethnic majority, as according to Bolovan's interpretation of Anton Verantius' work the Romanians were at least 50% of the population. His estimates between 1690 and 1847 about the population are 52,7% Romanians, 27,3% Hungarians and Székelys, 16,7% Germans and 3,3% other ethnic groups; based on several types of administrative documents. He also asserts that no significant demographic change happened since then based on the 1750 Habsburg fiscal conscription, while other contemporary administrative document report that Transylvania actually had a Romanian emigration. With even Emperor Joseph II noting in 1773 that: "These poor Romanian subjects, who are without doubt the oldest and most numerous inhabitants of Transylvania, are tormented and burdened with injustices by everyone - whether Hungarians or Saxons - so much so that, indeed, when one comes to know their condition, it is truly pitiable, and it is remarkable that so many of these people still remain here."

Pope Pius II noted in the 15th century book Europe that Transylvania "was populated in our age by three races: Germans, Székelys, and Vlachs", he also stated "you can find only a few men skilled in combat among the Transylvanians who do not know Hungarian".

Laonikos Chalkokondyles writes about the inhabitants of Transylvania, in The Histories from the late 15th century: "These people speak the language of the Hungarians in part and in part also of the Wallachians, and they have the same customs and way of life of the Hungarians. This land is subject to the king of the Hungarians and receives as its lord whatever Hungarian the king appoints over them."

According to Hungarian historian István Lázár, at the time of the death of King Matthias of Hungary in 1490, Transylvania is estimated to have had just under 500,000 inhabitants. Hungarians, including the Székelys, made up about 60% of the population, Romanians 24%, and Saxons most of the remaining 16%.

=== 16th century to 19th century ===
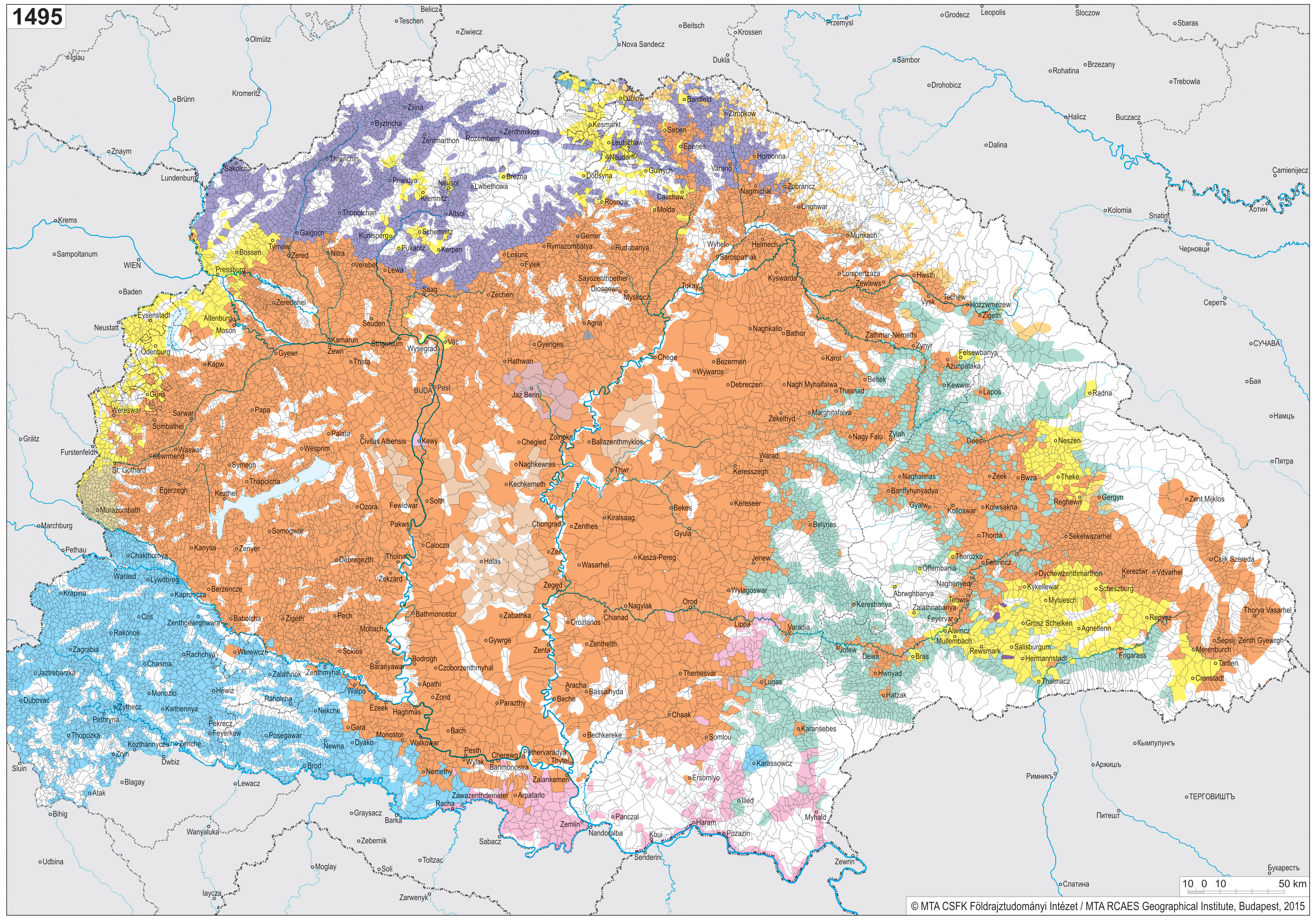

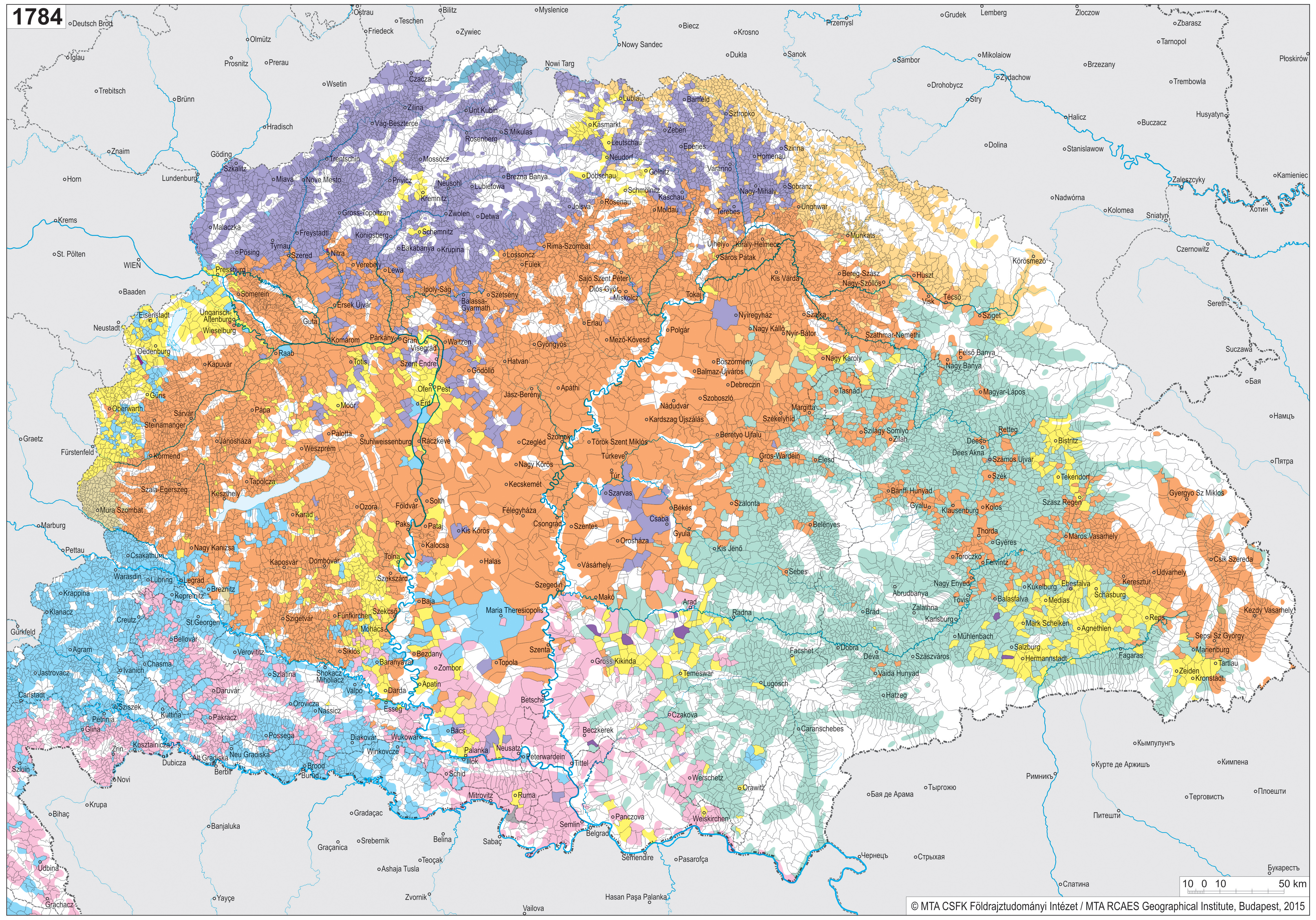
Estimated ethnic maps of the Kingdom of Hungary in 1495 (before Ottoman rule) and in 1784 (decades after Ottoman rule) by the Hungarian Academy of Sciences, based on research from Hungarian scholars. Hungarians are depicted in orange, the ethnic pattern of Hungary changed due to the centuries long wars and migration movements. The date 1495 is based on a nationwide registry conducted in the Kingdom of Hungary by commission of the royal treasury. The 1495 map shows the estimated absolute or relative linguistic majority of the local population based on the family names of taxpayers recorded in national or domanial registers, the linguistic analysis of the names of geographic objects and on various scholarly sources. The date 1784 is based a census of Joseph II. The 1784 map show the estimate of linguistic majorities at settlement level on the basis of ecclesiastical registers, gazetteers and monographs, which also contained contemporary language and religious data.

Nicolaus Olahus, Primate of Hungary stated in the book Hungaria et Athila in 1536 that in Transylvania "Four nations of different origins live in it: Hungarians, Székelys, Saxons, and Vlachs"

Antun Vrančić's work (Expeditionis Solymani in Moldaviam et Transsylvaniam libri duo. De situ Transsylvaniae, Moldaviae et Transalpinae liber tertius) is translated two different ways. In Pop's translation, he wrote that Transylvania "is inhabited by three nations – Székelys, Hungarians and Saxons; I should also add the Romanians who – even though they easily equal the others in number – have no liberties, no nobility and no rights of their own, except for a small number living in the District of Hátszeg, where it is believed that the capital of Decebalus lay, and who were made nobles during the time of John Hunyadi, a native of that place, because they always took part tirelessly in the battles against the Turks", while according to Károly Nyárády R., the proper translation of the first part of the sentence would be: "...I should also add the Romanians who – even though they easily equal any of the others in number..." ("adiungam tamen et Valacchos, qui quamlibet harum facile agnitudine aequant"). In fact, Romanian autonomies also existed in Fogaras, Temes and Máramaros.

The Chancellor of Transylvania, Bishop Ferenc Forgács, a protégé of Nicolaus Olahus, wrote around 1570 that Romanians made up less than 1/3 of Transylvania's population.

Ferrante Capeci writes in a letter to Claudio Aquaviva, which dates to 24 February 1584, about the inhabitants of Transylvania, claiming that "Transylvania is inhabited by three sorts of people, and all have distinct languages. The Vlachs, which are the oldest inhabitants and descend from Italians and Lombards. [...] The other inhabitants are Hungarians who descend from the Huns and Scythians, hence a part of Transylvania is called Scitulia, which today with a corrupted word, as some want, they say Siculia. The third inhabitants are Saxon Germans, who came there in the time of Charlemagne and still retain the Saxon language, although very depraved; they also speak Hungarian."

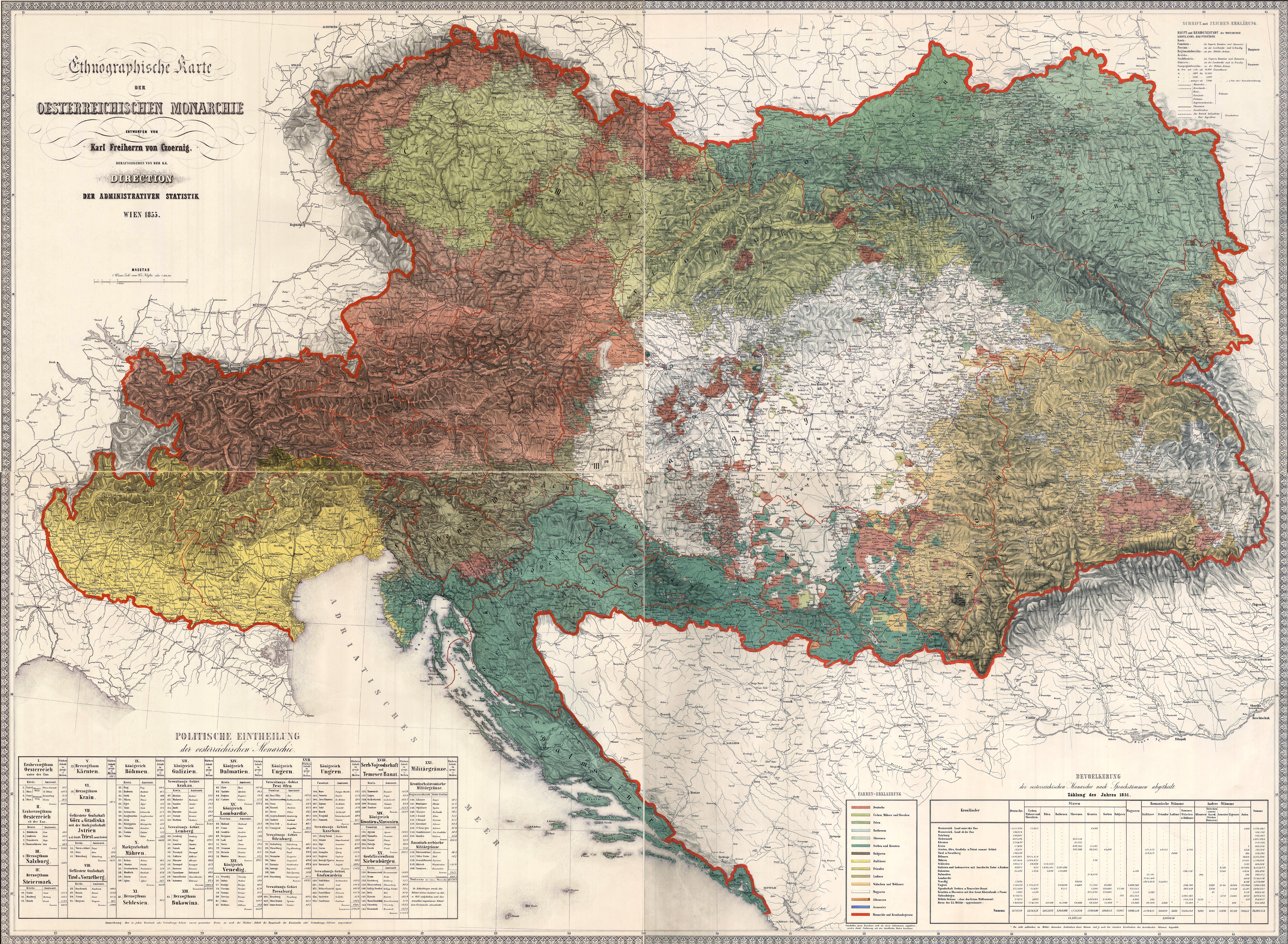
Ethnographic composition of the Austrian Empire (1855)

According to George W. White, in 1600 the Romanian inhabitants were primarily peasants, comprising more than 60 percent of the population.

Zacharias Geizkofler, the chief tax collector of the Holy Roman Empire, who traveled throughout Hungary as paymaster general of the imperial armies, recorded in 1602 at the Diet of Hungary held at Pozsony that whereas formerly there were very few Romanian villages – so that whether they paid the tithe or not hardly entered into consideration – now the Romanian villages in the mountains have greatly multiplied, the mountainous regions have been brought under intensive cultivation, while, by contrast, the lowlands, as a result of the enemy's ravages during the Ottoman wartimes, have become completely depopulated and laid waste. According to Hungarian historiography, the migration of Romanians during the Ottoman occupation in the 17th century unfolded in two main directions. They gradually expanded towards the northern and eastern edges of the Transylvanian Basin and the Great Hungarian Plain. The second wave of settlement moved from the mountains, following the river valleys to the north and west, settling in the sparsely populated Hungarian villages on the edge of the plain.

In Letopisețul Țării Moldovei (1642–1647), the Moldavian chronicler Grigore Ureche notices that "Transylvania is more spread out by Romanians than by Hungarians".

Around 1650, Vasile Lupu in a letter written to the sultan attests that the number of Romanians are more than the one-third of the population.

In 1666, Johannes Tröster stated in his book Das Alt- und Neu-Teutsche Dacia that Romanians in Transylvania are so numerous "they could almost outnumber both the Hungarians and the Germans" living there.

Evliya Çelebi (1611–1682) was an Ottoman explorer who traveled through the territory of the Ottoman Empire and neighboring lands over a period of forty years, recording his commentary in a travelogue called the Seyahatnâme "Book of Travel". His trip to Hungary was between 1660 and 1666. The Transylvanian's state of development in the 17th century was so good, that it was an attraction to strangers longing for its territory. Evliya Çelebi writes this in his book that the Romanian serfs move en masse to Transylvania because of the extreme ruthlessness of the rulers of Romanian lands. The Romanians say there is justice, legal order, and low taxes in Transylvania.

In Wallachia the beys were very tyrannical over them, therefore these rayahs saying: "Let justice be justice", all moved to Transylvania and pay one gold tribute to the king and they have no other duties.

— Evliya Çelebi: Seyahatnâme

In 1684, Miron Costin wrote in his work Istoria în versuri polone despre Țara Moldovei și Munteniei: "To this day, they (Transylvanian Romanians) are much more numerous than Hungarians, starting from Bačka of the Serbs of Temes, all over the Mureș, in Hațeg, around Bălgrad, where the princes live, in the Olt country and all over Maramureș".

In 1702 Andreas Freyberger wrote: "the Romanians are spread throughout all Transylvania, even in Szekelyland, and the land of the seats of the Saxons. There is no village, no market, no suburb, that doesn't have its own Romanians."

According to an official estimates made by the Austrian administrative authority (Verwaltungsgericht) dating from 1712–1713, the ethnic distribution of the population in Transylvania is as follows: 47% Hungarians, 34% Romanians, 19%, Saxons.

Andreas Teutsch (1669-1730) writes in his Historia Regni sive Principatus Transylvaniae that the Vlachs form the most numerous ethnic group and that all Transylvanian writers consider them to be descendants from Roman colonists in Dacia.

In the 16th and 17th centuries, the Ottoman conquest turned Kingdom of Hungary into a battlefield. According to Hungarian historiography, the ethnic pattern of Hungary changed significantly due to the centuries long wars. During the Ottoman occupation, the Principality of Transylvania maintained the continuity of Hungarian statehood. According to Hungarian historiography, the Habsburg–Wallachian military campaigns between 1599 and 1604, and Ottoman–Tatar military campaigns between 1657 and 1661 were destructive for the Hungarians living in the region and the Hungarian settlements connecting the Hungarian ethnic blocks of the Partium and Székely Land suffered the most extensive destruction. According to Hungarian historical scholarship, between the Battle of Mohács in 1526 and the suppression of Rákóczi's War of Independence in 1711, the Hungarian and Catholic dominated population structure of the Late Medieval Kingdom of Hungary was broken up, in Transylvania the Romanians became majority and the Hungarians became a minority population, and in the more sheltered mountainous regions, the Romanian population steadily grew, benefiting from additional immigration from Wallachia and Moldavia.

The Transylvanian Law of 1744 mentioned the Romanians as newcomer nation. Baron István Dániel member of the 1744 Transylvanian national assembly, mentioned in his memorandum from that year that the fertility of Romanians is astonishing, and many villages that were partly inhabited by Vlachs, partly by Hungarians or Saxons 50 years ago, are now entirely populated by the offsprings of newcomer Vlachs.

Romanian historiography on other hand asserts that emigration of Romanians from Transylvania outpaced their immigration, with a significant number of Transylvanian Romanians moving to Wallachia and Moldova from the 16th century onwards. This phenomenon, which was also present in the Middle Ages during the founding of Moldova and Wallachia, intensified after György Dózsa's rebellion in 1514, along with religious persecution and deteriorating living conditions for Romanian Transylvanians. In year 1552, Hungarian nobles from Deva complained of a "massive fleeing" towards Wallachia due to looting by Giambattista Castaldo's army. In 1609 the Transylvanian Diet requested measures to stop serfs from crossing into the Danubian Principalities. In 1662 Michael I Apafi urged the inhabitants of Bistrița to stop the movement of the impoverished people towards Moldova. Food shortages, along with the famine of 1684–1686 driven by rising grain prices, led some of inhabitants to leave Transylvania, which resulted in many villages in the Fundus Regius being abandoned. The Vásárhely Diet of December 1694 reported that one-third of the population of the Făgăraș Country had emigrated to Wallachia. On May 7, 1699, Austrian emperor Leopold I attributed the population’s exodus to the Danubian Principalities and other Ottoman-controlled regions to the failures of the Transylvanian ruling class. By the 18th century, emigration of Transylvanian Romanians towards Moldova and Wallachia had grown even further.

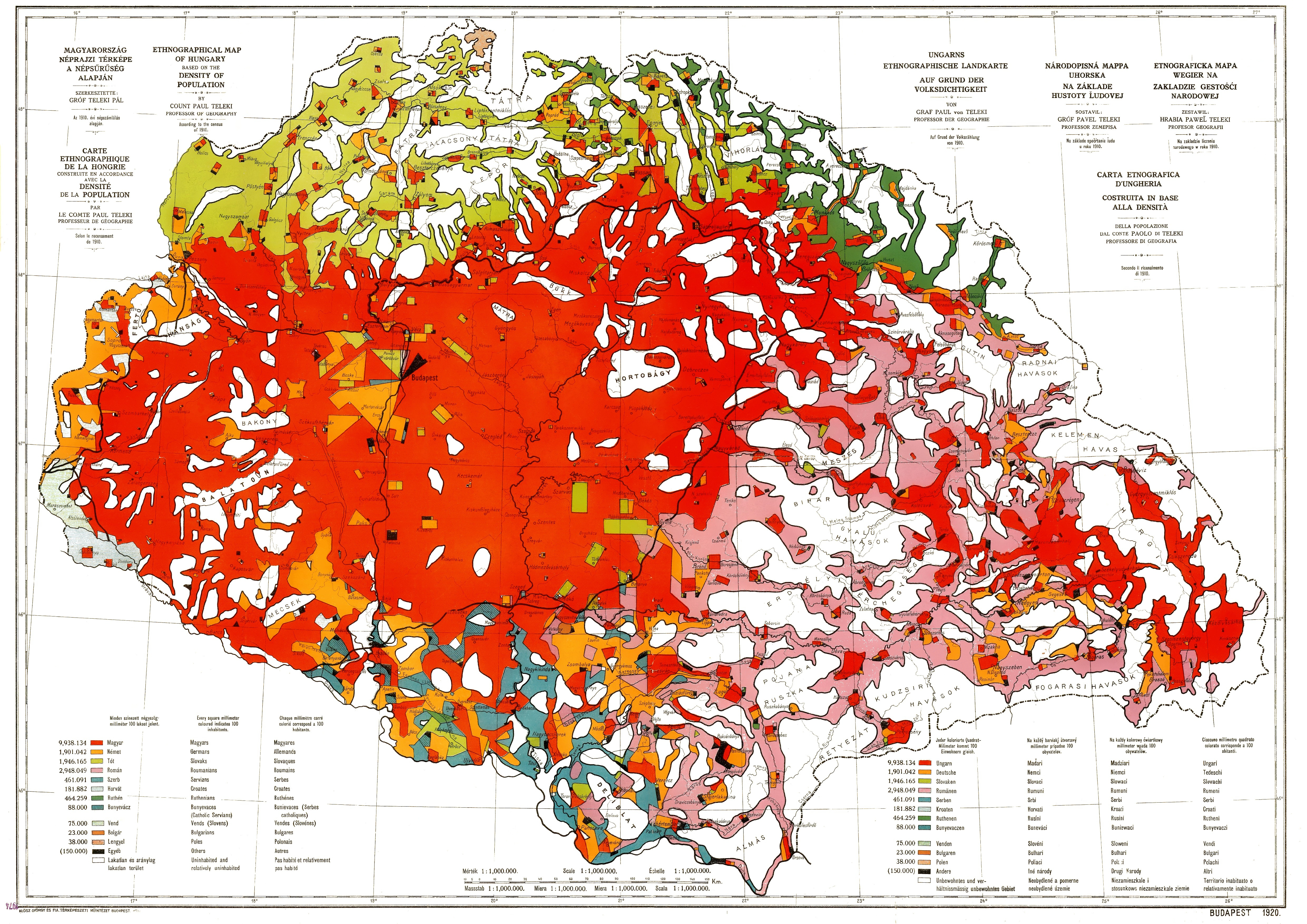
The Red Map. Ethnic map of the Hungary proper publicized by the Hungarian delegation. Regions with population density below 20 persons/km^{2} are left blank and the corresponding population is represented in the nearest region with population density above that limit. The vibrant, dominant red color was deliberately chosen to mark Hungarians while the light purple color of the Romanians, who were already the majority in the whole of Transylvania back then, is shadow-like.

In Benedek Jancsó's estimation there were 150,000 Hungarians (~30%), 100,000 Saxons (~20%) and 250,000 Romanians (~50%) out of 500,000 people in Transylvania at the beginning of the 18th century. Official censuses with information on Transylvania's ethnic composition have been conducted since the 18th century. On May 1, 1784, Joseph II called for a census of the empire, including Transylvania. The data were published in 1787; however, this census showed only the overall population.

Saxon pastor and commissioned of the Austrian authorities during the Hungarian War of Independence, Stephan Ludwig Roth said using Romanian is how a Hungarian and a German-speaker communicate with each other. He praised the great sounding of the language and its "Latin spirit".

The first official census in Transylvania in which a distinction was made between nationalities (distinction made on the basis of mother tongue) was made by the Austro-Hungarian authorities in 1869, counting 59,0% Romanians, 24,9% Hungarians and 11,9% Germans out of a total population of 4.224.436 people.

For the period before this year there are only estimates of the proportions of various ethnic groups in Transylvania. Thus, Fényes Elek, a Hungarian statistician from the 19th century, estimated in 1842 that the population of Transylvania in the years 1830–1840 was composed of 62.3% Romanians and 23.3% Hungarians.

Between 1880 and 1910, the census system in Austria-Hungary was based on first language used for communication. Before 1880, Jews were counted as an ethnic group; later, they were counted according to their first language, and the majority (75.7%) of the Jewish population reported Hungarian as their primary language, so they were counted as ethnically Hungarian in the censuses.

== Estimations and censuses ==
The data recorded in all estimates and censuses is presented in the table below.

Year	Total	Romanians	Hungarians	Germans	Székelys (Note: when counted separately from Hungarians)	Notes
1241 (Note: The data from 1301–1308, 1700 (Benedek Jancsó's estimation), 1730 (Austrian statistics), 1765 (Hóman and Szekfü record), and the 1850 census refer to Transylvania proper only: the counties, districts and regions of Belső-Szolnok County, District of Beszterce, District of Hátszeg, Doboka County, Fehér County, Fogarasföld, Hunyad County, Royal Lands, Kolozs County, Küküllő County, Székely Land and Torda County. It therefore excludes the data from the counties of Arad County, Bihar County, Közép-Szolnok County, Kővárvidék, Krassó County, Kraszna County, Máramaros County, Szatmár County, Szörény County, Temes County and Zaránd County.)	-	~66%	-	-	-	Estimation by Jean W. Sedlar: at that time, the actual number of people belonging to each nationality was, at best, guesswork
1301–1308	349,000	5.1%	88.8%	6.0%	-	Estimation by Lajos Tamás based on the List of Papal Tithes from 1332 to 1337
1301–1308		~65%	34-40%		-	Estimation by Ioan-Aurel Pop based on the List of Papal Tithes from 1332 to 1337
1356	-	>50%	-	-	-	Estimation by Ioan-Aurel Pop based on the words of Pope Innocent VI.
1437	-	>50%	-	-	-	Estimation by Vlad Georgescu
1490	<~ 500,000	~24%	~60%	~16%		Estimation by István Lázár
1495	454,000-516,045	22%	55,2%	22%	-	Estimation by Kubinyi András and Károly Kocsis & Eszter Kocsis-Hodosi
1500	~1,000,000	-	-	-	-	Estimation by Bogdan Murgescu
1500	-	24%	47%	16%	13%	Estimation by Elemér Mályusz (1898–1989)
1549–1551	-	>50%	-	-	-	Estimation by Ioan-Aurel Pop, Ioan Bolovan, and Sorina-Paula Bolovan, based on Antun Vrančić's writings
1549–1551	-	~25%	~25%	~25%	~25%	Estimation by Károly Nyárády R., based on the contemporary work of Antun Vrančić, Archbishop of Esztergom and Primate of Hungary
1570		<33,33%				Contemporary estimation by Bishop Ferenc Forgács, Chancellor of Transylvania
1571	955,000	29.3%	52.3%	9.4%	-	Estimation by Akadémiai Kiadó
1595	670,000	~28.4%	52,2%	18,8%	-	Estimation by Károly Kocsis & Eszter Kocsis-Hodosi
1600	-	~60%	-	-		Estimation by George W. White
1650	-	>33,33%	-	-		Contemporary estimation by Vasile Lupu, Prince of Moldavia
1700	~500,000	~50%	~30%	~20%	-	Estimation by Benedek Jancsó (1854–1930)
1700	~800,000–865,000				-	Estimation by Zsolt Trócsányi
1702	-	>50%	-	-	-	Estimation by Ioan and Sorina-Paula Bolovan, based on Andreas Freyberger's writings
1712–1713		~34%	~47%	~19%	-	An official estimate by the Austrian administrative authority (Verwaltungsgericht) dating from 1712–1713
1720	806,221	49,6%	37,2%	12,2%	-	Estimation by Károly Kocsis & Eszter Kocsis-Hodosi
1721	-	48,28%	36.09%	15.62%	-	Estimation by Ignác Acsády
1730	~725,000	57.9%	26.2%	15.1%	-	Austrian statistics
1765	~1,000,000	55.9%	26%	12%	-	Estimation by Bálint Hóman and Gyula Szekfü (1883–1955)
1773	1,066,017	63.5%	24.2%	12.3%	-	
1784	1,440,986	-	-	-	-	
1784–1787	2,489,147	63.5%	24.1%	12.4%	-	Austrian statistics
1790	1,465,000	50.8%	30.4%	-	-	
1835	-	62.3%	23.3%	-	-	
1850	2,073,372	59.1%	25.9%	9.3%	-	
1850	1,823,212	57.2%	26.7%	10.5%	-	1850/51. census
1869	4,224,436	59.0%	24.9%	11.9%	-	Austro-Hungarian population census
1880	4,032,851	57.0%	25.9%	12.5%	-	Austro-Hungarian population census (based on primary used language)
1890	4,429,564	56.0%	27.1%	12.5%	-	Austro-Hungarian population census (based on primary used language)
1900	4,840,722	55.2%	29.4%	11.9%	-	Austro-Hungarian population census (based on primary used language)
1910	5,262,495	53.8%	31.6%	10.7%	-	Austro-Hungarian population census (based on primary used language)
1919	5,208,345	57.3%	25.5%	10.6%	-	Romanian statistics
1920	5,114,214	58.3%	26.7%	9.7%	-	Romanian statistics
1930	5,548,363	57.8%	24.4%	9.8%	-	Romanian population census
1948	5,761,127	65.1%	25.7%	5.8%	-	Romanian population census (based on mother tongue)
1956	6,232,312	65.5%	25.9%	6.0%	-	Romanian population census
1966	6,736,046	68.0%	24.2%	5.6%	-	Romanian population census
1977	7,500,229	69.4%	22.6%	4.6%	-	Romanian population census
1992	7,723,313	75.3%	21.0%	1.2%	-	Romanian population census
2002	7,221,733	74.7%	19.6%	0.7%	-	Romanian population census
2011	6,789,250	70.6%	17.9%	0.4%	-	Romanian population census For 378,298 inhabitants (5.57%) ethnicity was not available
2021	6,489,189	76.4%	17.3%	0.3%	-	Romanian population census For 743,807 inhabitants (11.5%) ethnicity was not available
Footnotes:

== Sources ==
- Lázár, István (1997). Transylvania - A Short History (PDF). Safety Harbor, Florida: Simon Publications. ISBN 1-931313-21-0.
