= Ion Hebedeanu =

Romanian cross-country skier (born 1925)

Ion Hebedeanu (born 29 July 1925) is a Romanian cross-country skier who competed in the 1950s. He finished 32nd in the 50 km event at the 1952 Winter Olympics in Oslo. He was born in Abrud.
