= Auraria Daciae =

Coordinates: 46°16′20″N 23°04′07″E

- Castellum of Abrud; Auraria Maior, Alburnus Minor, Abruttus
- Location within Romania
- Location: Cetățuia / Cetățeaua, Abrud, Alba, Romania

History
- Founded: 2nd century AD
- Abandoned: 3rd century AD

Site notes
- Condition: Ruined

The fort was part of the defensive system of the Roman province of Dacia in the 2nd and 3rd centuries AD. The ruins of a contemporary nearby defensive ditch was also unearthed. It is located in Abrud (Romania).

== See also ==
- List of castra
