= Alexandru Sterca-Șuluțiu =

Ethnic Romanian Eastern Catholic cleric

- Archeparch of Făgăraș and Alba Iulia
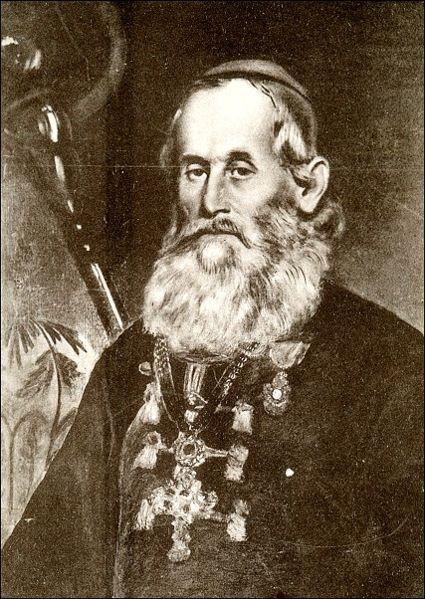
- Church: Romanian Greek Catholic Church
- Archdiocese: Major Archeparchy of Făgăraș and Alba Iulia
- In office: 17 February 1851 – 7 September 1867
- Predecessor: Ioan Lemeni
- Successor: Ioan Vancea

Orders
- Ordination: 1814
- Consecration: 22 July 1851 by Vasile Erdeli

Personal details
- Born: 15 February 1794 Abrudbánya, Alsó-Fehér County, Grand Principality of Transylvania, Habsburg Empire
- Died: 7 September 1861 (aged 67)

Alexandru Sterca-Șuluțiu, also called Alexandru Sterca-Șuluțiu de Cărpiniș (15 February 1794 – 7 September 1867), was an ethnic Romanian Eastern Catholic cleric in Imperial Austrian Transylvania, and the Metropolitan of the Transylvanian Greek Catholic Church. He was the brother of 1848 revolutionary commander Ioan Sterca-Șuluțiu.

During his service the Diocese of Alba Iulia and Făgăraş (centred at Blaj) was removed from the jurisdiction of the Roman Catholic Archdiocese of Esztergom (in Hungary) and became an ecclesiastic province in its own right, with the Dioceses of Oradea Mare, Gherla and Lugoj as suffragans (subordinate dioceses).

== Origins and studies ==
Born in Abrud, Șuluțiu came from a noble Romanian family of Transylvania. The roots of the family seem to be very old, as the Italian spelling of this family name is Sollozzo. He studied at Abrud, Alba Iulia and Blaj, where he prepared for the priesthood in the diocesan seminary. On 8 November 1814, he married Ana Aron of Bistra, and on 6 December of the same year he was made a priest. His wife died on 18 February 1818, leaving him a widower.

== Ecclesiastical career ==
In 1836 he became the archpriest of Şimleu. In the electoral synod on 30 September 1850, he ended up first of the candidates running to fill the episcopal seat of Făgăraș and Alba Iulia. On 18 November 1850, he was named to the post, while on 22 July 1851, he was consecrated bishop in Saint Nicholas Cathedral, Oradea.

On 6 December 1853, Pope Pius IX removed the diocese of Făgăraș from the metropolitan jurisdiction and primacy of the archbishop of Esztergom, and raised it to the dignity of archdiocese and metropolitanate. Through this act, Bishop Șuluțiu became both Archbishop and Metropolitan. On 28 October 1855, he was installed in his new post in a great ceremony held at Blaj in the presence of the Apostolic Nuncio from Vienna, Cardinal Michele Viale-Prelà (later Roman Catholic Archbishop of Bologna).

== Bibliography ==
- Nicolae Edroiu, "O lucrare istorică inedită a lui Alexandru Sterca-Șuluțiu" ("A Previously Unpublished Historical Work of Alexandru Sterca-Șuluțiu"), in Anuarul Institutului de Istorie și Arheologie din Cluj, XXV, 1982, pp. 287–294
- Corina Teodor, "Un spirit polemic: Alexandru Sterca-Șuluțiu" ("A Polemical Spirit: Alexandru Sterca-Șuluțiu"), in Anuarul Institutului de Cercetări Socio-Umane "Gheorghe Șincai" al Academiei Române, Târgu-Mureş, 1999
- Nicolae Edroiu, Aurel Răduțiu, Pompiliu Teodor (ed.), "Preocupările istorice ale lui Alexandru Sterca-Șuluțiu (1794-1867)" ("The Historic Concerns of Alexandru Sterca-Șuluțiu (1794-1867)"), in Stat, societate, națiune. Interpretări istorice ("State, Society, Nation. Historic Interpretations"), Cluj-Napoca, Editura Dacia, 1982.
