= Ioan Sterca-Șuluțiu =

Ethnic Romanian bureaucrat

Ioan Sterca-Șuluțiu (1796–1858) was an ethnic Romanian bureaucrat in the administration of Imperial Austrian Transylvania, owner of gold mines at Abrud, and the brother of Greek-Catholic Metropolitan Alexandru Sterca-Șuluțiu. He was the father of the judge Dionisie Sterca-Șuluțiu and of the historian Iosif Sterca-Șuluțiu.

Born in Abrudbánya, Alsó-Fehér County, Principality of Transylvania (present-day Abrud, Alba County, Romania) Șuluțiu served as an officer in the Imperial and Royal Army, during the last years of the Napoleonic Wars.

Upon the outbreak of the Transylvanian Revolution of 1848, Șuluțiu, who for years had worked in the administration of his native town, was unanimously proclaimed tribune over the area, with the rank of major. Serving in the Auraria Gemina Legion under Avram Iancu, he played a decisive role in organizing the local moți along military lines. That year, his house in Abrud served as a meeting place for the ethnic Romanian leaders of the Transylvanian revolution that year, and as a place of refuge for participants in the Wallachian revolutionary movement. Alexandru G. Golescu stayed in Șuluțiu's house until Russian troops entered Transylvania, when he fled to Paris.

As an experienced soldier, Șuluțiu was the tactical leader of the 1848 Romanian military operations in the Apuseni Mountains against the Hungarian revolutionary government. While the main weapon of the revolutionaries was the lance made by village craftsmen, their artillery was limited to the cherry-wood cannon invented by Șuluțiu, and used against the Hungarian revolutionaries.

With Șuluțiu acting as an intermediary, the Austrian commander of the citadel at Alba Iulia sent munitions to the inhabitants of the mountains, in order to bolster their resistance against the pressure of the revolutionary Hungarian armies.

Șuluțiu also distinguished himself after the end of the revolution, by developing Romanian enterprises in Transylvania.
