= Abrud =

- Town
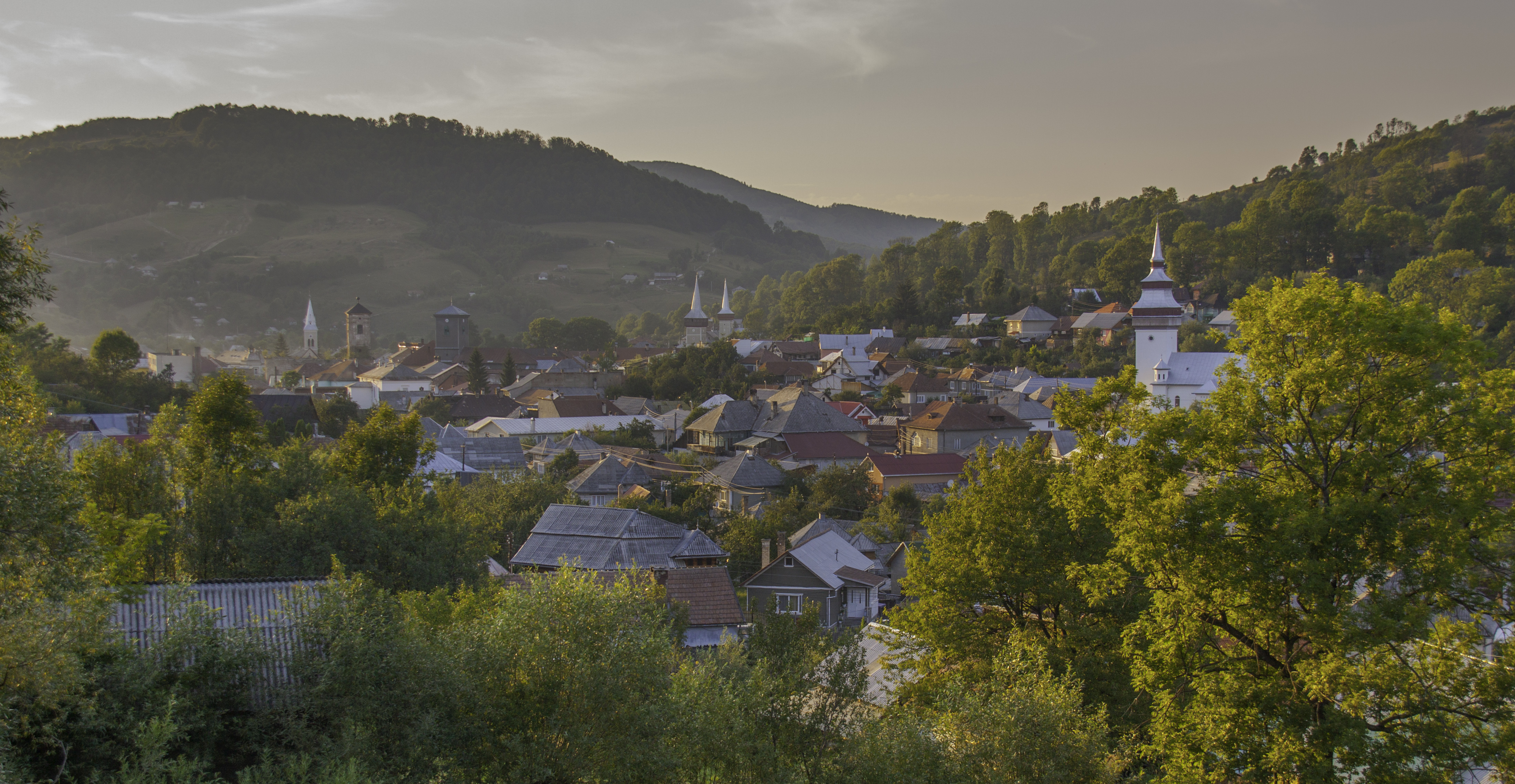

- Coat of arms

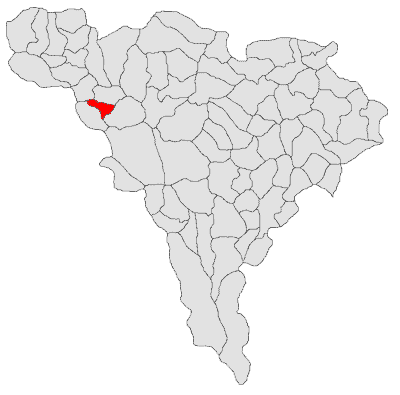
- Location in Alba County

- Location in Romania
- Coordinates: 46°16′26″N 23°3′48″E
- Country: Romania
- County: Alba

Government
  - Mayor (2024–2028): Radu-Marcel Tuhuț (PSD)
- Area: 32.00 km^{2} (12.36 sq mi)
- Elevation: 627 m (2,057 ft)
- Population (2021-12-01): 4,360
  - Density: 136/km^{2} (353/sq mi)
- Time zone: UTC+02:00 (EET)
  - Summer (DST): UTC+03:00 (EEST)
- Postal code: 515100
- Area code: (+40) 02 58
- Vehicle reg.: AB
- Website: www.primaria-abrud.ro

Abrud (Latin: Abruttus; Hungarian: Abrudbánya; German: Großschlatten) is a town in the north-western part of Alba County, Transylvania, Romania, located on the river Abrud. It administers three villages: Abrud-Sat (Abrudfalva), Gura Cornei (Szarvaspataktorka) and Soharu (Szuhár).

== Population ==
Historical population
| Year | Pop. | ±% |
|---|---|---|
| 1912 | 2,938 | — |
| 1930 | 2,468 | −16.0% |
| 1948 | 2,656 | +7.6% |
| 1956 | 4,411 | +66.1% |
| 1966 | 5,150 | +16.8% |
| 1977 | 5,315 | +3.2% |
| 1992 | 6,729 | +26.6% |
| 2002 | 6,803 | +1.1% |
| 2011 | 4,944 | −27.3% |
| 2021 | 4,360 | −11.8% |
Source: INS, Census data

At the 2021 census, Abrud had a population of 4,360. According to the census from 2011, the town had a total population of 4,944; of those, 96.66% were ethnic Romanians, 0.86% ethnic Hungarians, and 0.53% ethnic Romani.

== Name ==
The name likely came from the ancient name of the Abrud river. Although first recorded only in 1271 in the form terra Obruth, the name of the town might have derived from a hypothetical Dacian word for gold: "obrud". The modern Hungarian name is Abrudbánya ("bánya" means mine in Hungarian). According to Hungarian linguists, the Romanian name Abrud was borrowed from the Hungarian form prior to a hypothetical 14th century vowel shift (from o to a), which has also been invoked to explain other borrowings of pre-conquest toponyms such as the Szamos and Maros rivers which also have disputed etymologies. Hungarian linguists claim that if the ancient form had survived directly into Romanian, then the extrapolation of linguistic patterns would favour the form Aurud. In contrast, Romanian linguist Nicolae Drăganu claims that the Romanian form beginning with A was directly inherited from linguistic patterns in Romanized-Dacians (e.g. attested Dacian to Latin; Potaissa to Pataissa, Porolissum to Paralissum, etc.), while the Hungarian form beginning with O was borrowed from the Daco-Romans through Slavic mediation, where transformations from A to O are fairly common.

== History ==
=== Antiquity ===
The Romans erected a small fortification here in the 2nd century AD. It was part of the defence system of the gold mines nearby, in "Alburnus Maior" (nowadays, Roșia Montană), but it was abandoned in the 3rd century.

=== Middle Ages ===
Abrud was first recorded in 1271 in as terra Obruth. It gained town status in 1427.

=== 18th-century revolts ===
In 1727, the leaders of a revolt gained control of the town. Another serfs' revolt began in the area in 1784 with Horea, Cloșca and Crișan as leaders fighting the Austrian Imperial forces. Abrud was captured by the uprising's members on 6 November, before the revolt was crushed by the Austrian army.

=== 1848 revolution ===
During the Hungarian Revolution of 1848, negotiations took place in Abrud between the leaders of the Romanian peasants, led by Avram Iancu and Ion Dragoș, the envoy of Lajos Kossuth, deputy of Bihar County in the Parliament of Budapest, regarding the conciliation of the Romanian and Hungarian revolutionary forces. On 6 May, in violation of the negotiated armistice, Major Imre Hatvani conducted a one-way action without any compliance by attacking and occupying Abrud which triggered the Abrud massacre. Hatvani embarked also on unnecessary killings, hanged Romanian lawyer Ioan Buteanu, while his drunken soldiers massacred prefect Petru Dobra. In the next two weeks 88 Romanians were killed in the central square, and around 2,500 Hungarians were killed in revenge by Iancu's army in Abrud and in Roșia Montană; Dragoș was also killed, being considered a traitor. The escalated conflict could not be settled, Abrud was conquered and lost several times by the Hungarian troops, until 18 May when they retreated to Arad.

== Natives ==
- Ovidiu Bic
- Alexandru Ciura
- Ion Hebedeanu
- Antal Kagerbauer
- Alexandru Sterca-Șuluțiu
- Ioan Sterca-Șuluțiu
- Nick Stuart

== Climate ==
Abrud has a humid continental climate (Cfb in the Köppen climate classification).

Climate data for Abrud
| Month | Jan | Feb | Mar | Apr | May | Jun | Jul | Aug | Sep | Oct | Nov | Dec | Year |
|---|---|---|---|---|---|---|---|---|---|---|---|---|---|
| Mean daily maximum °C (°F) | 0.8 (33.4) | 2.8 (37.0) | 7.4 (45.3) | 13.7 (56.7) | 18 (64) | 21.2 (70.2) | 22.9 (73.2) | 23.3 (73.9) | 18.4 (65.1) | 13.2 (55.8) | 7.9 (46.2) | 2.2 (36.0) | 12.6 (54.7) |
| Daily mean °C (°F) | −2.7 (27.1) | −1.1 (30.0) | 3.1 (37.6) | 9 (48) | 13.6 (56.5) | 17 (63) | 18.7 (65.7) | 19 (66) | 14.2 (57.6) | 9 (48) | 4.2 (39.6) | −1 (30) | 8.6 (47.4) |
| Mean daily minimum °C (°F) | −5.9 (21.4) | −4.7 (23.5) | −1.2 (29.8) | 3.9 (39.0) | 8.5 (47.3) | 11.9 (53.4) | 13.8 (56.8) | 14.2 (57.6) | 10 (50) | 5.2 (41.4) | 1.2 (34.2) | −3.8 (25.2) | 4.4 (40.0) |
| Average precipitation mm (inches) | 56 (2.2) | 53 (2.1) | 71 (2.8) | 97 (3.8) | 131 (5.2) | 149 (5.9) | 149 (5.9) | 108 (4.3) | 84 (3.3) | 62 (2.4) | 60 (2.4) | 66 (2.6) | 1,086 (42.9) |
Source: https://en.climate-data.org/europe/romania/alba/abrud-44395/
