= St. Nicholas Cathedral, Oradea =

Coordinates: 47.0539°N 21.9275°E

St. Nicholas Cathedral
- Catedrala Sfântul Nicolae
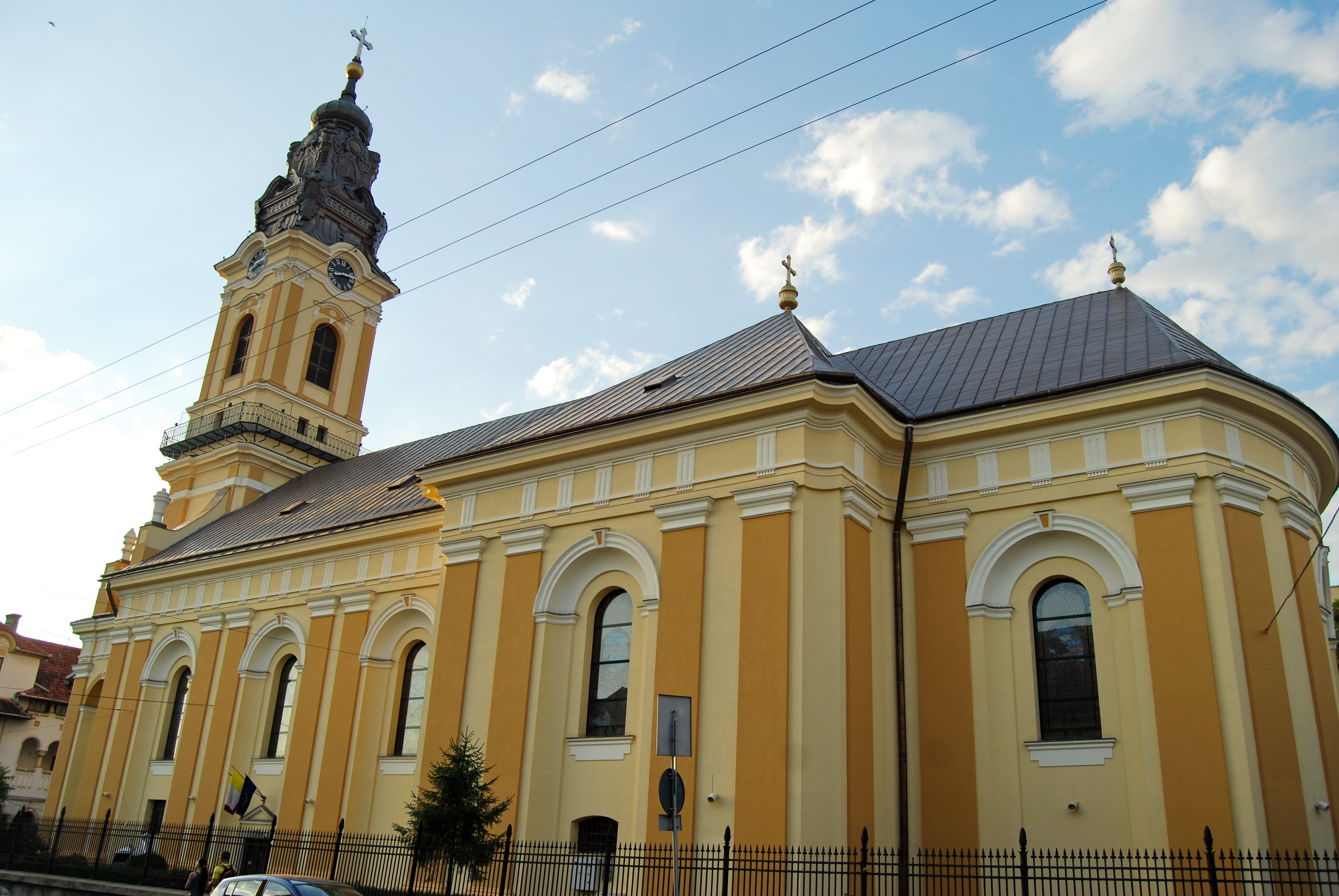
- St. Nicholas Cathedral
- Location: Oradea
- Country: Romania
- Denomination: Catholic Church (Romanian Rite)

The St. Nicholas Cathedral (Romanian: Catedrala Sfântul Nicolae) also called Greek-Catholic Cathedral of St. Nicholas It is a Catholic church that serves as the cathedral of the Eparchy of Oradea Mare (Eparchia Magnovaradinensis Romenorum). It is located in the city of Oradea in the European country of Romania.

== History ==
St. Nicholas Cathedral follows the Romanian Rite (Byzantine) and is in full communion the Pope in Rome. Its construction began in 1800, when the Greek Catholic Bishop Ignatius Darabant asked demolish the small Greek-Catholic church in the city and begin construction of the cathedral. The construction plan is cross-shaped design, vaulted ceiling and a central dome painted with biblical scenes. The baroque roof of the tower was completed in 1803 and burned down twice, in 1836 and 1907. The tower was designed by Giovanni Quai and was built between 1910 and 1912. In 1948, the church lost the status of a cathedral and reduced a simple parish church.

The place of worship was returned to the Greek Catholic Romanian church in November 2005, after long negotiations and delays. The first Greek Catholic liturgy took place after 57 years of interruption on November 20, 2005, with the participation of more than 100 bishops, priests and deacons.

== See also ==
- Roman Catholicism in Romania
