= Alsó-Fehér County =

County of the Kingdom of Hungary

Alsó-Fehér County Comitatus Albensis Inferior (Latin) Alsó-Fehér vármegye (Hungarian) Komitat Unterweißenburg (German) Comitatul Alba de Jos (Romanian)
- County of the Principality of Transylvania (1744-1867); County the Kingdom of Hungary (1867-1920)
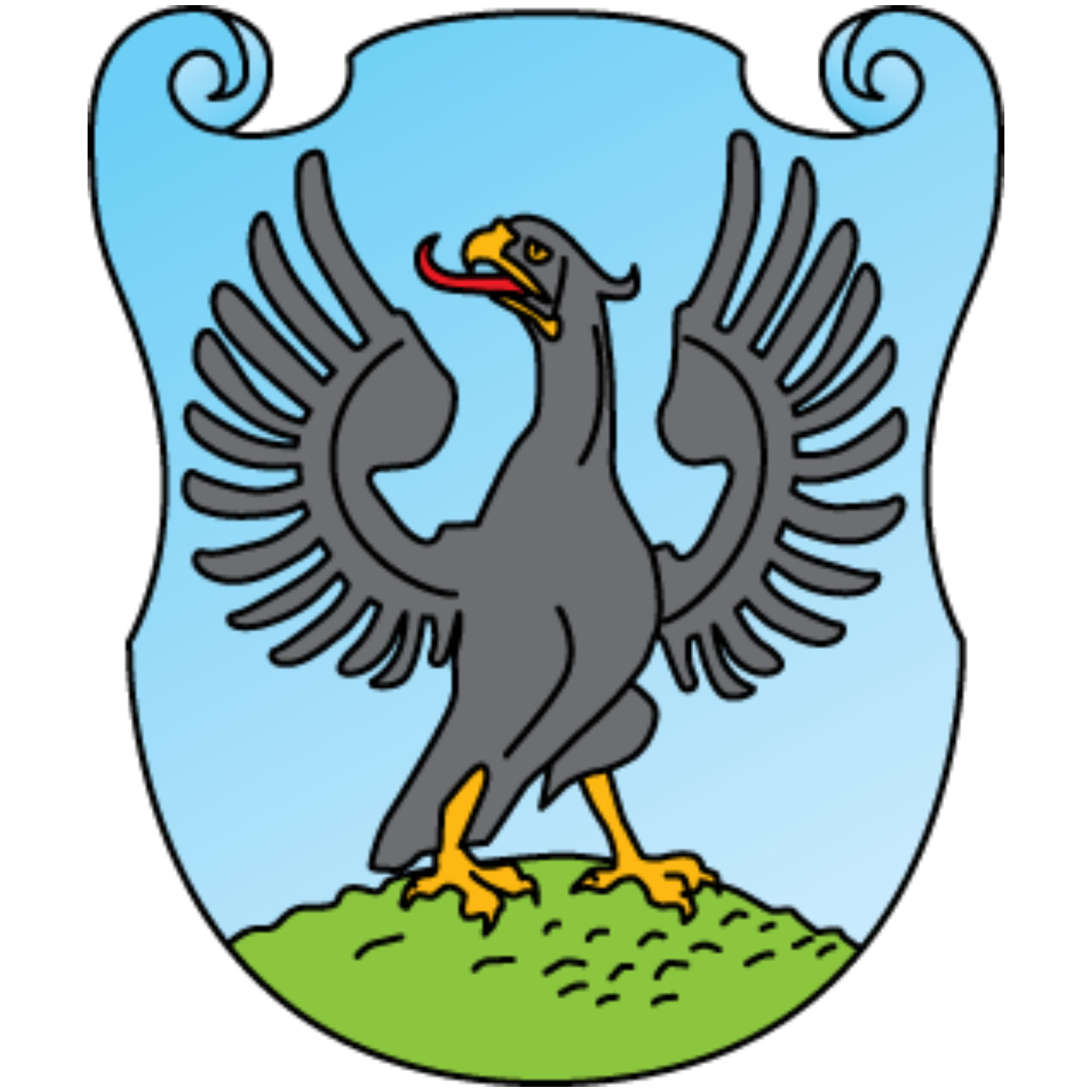
- Coat of arms

- Capital: Gyulafehérvár; Nagyenyed (1876-1920)
- Area
  - Coordinates: 46°19′N 23°44′E
  - 1910: 3,576.5 km^{2} (1,380.9 sq mi)
- Population
  - 1910: 221,618
- History
  - Established: 1744
  - Treaty of Trianon: 4 June 1920
- Today part of: Romania
- Alba Iulia; Aiud are the current name of the capital.

Alsó-Fehér (Lower Fehér) was an administrative county (comitatus) of the Kingdom of Hungary. Its territory is now in western Romania (central Transylvania). The latest capital of the county was Nagyenyed (present-day Aiud).

== Geography ==
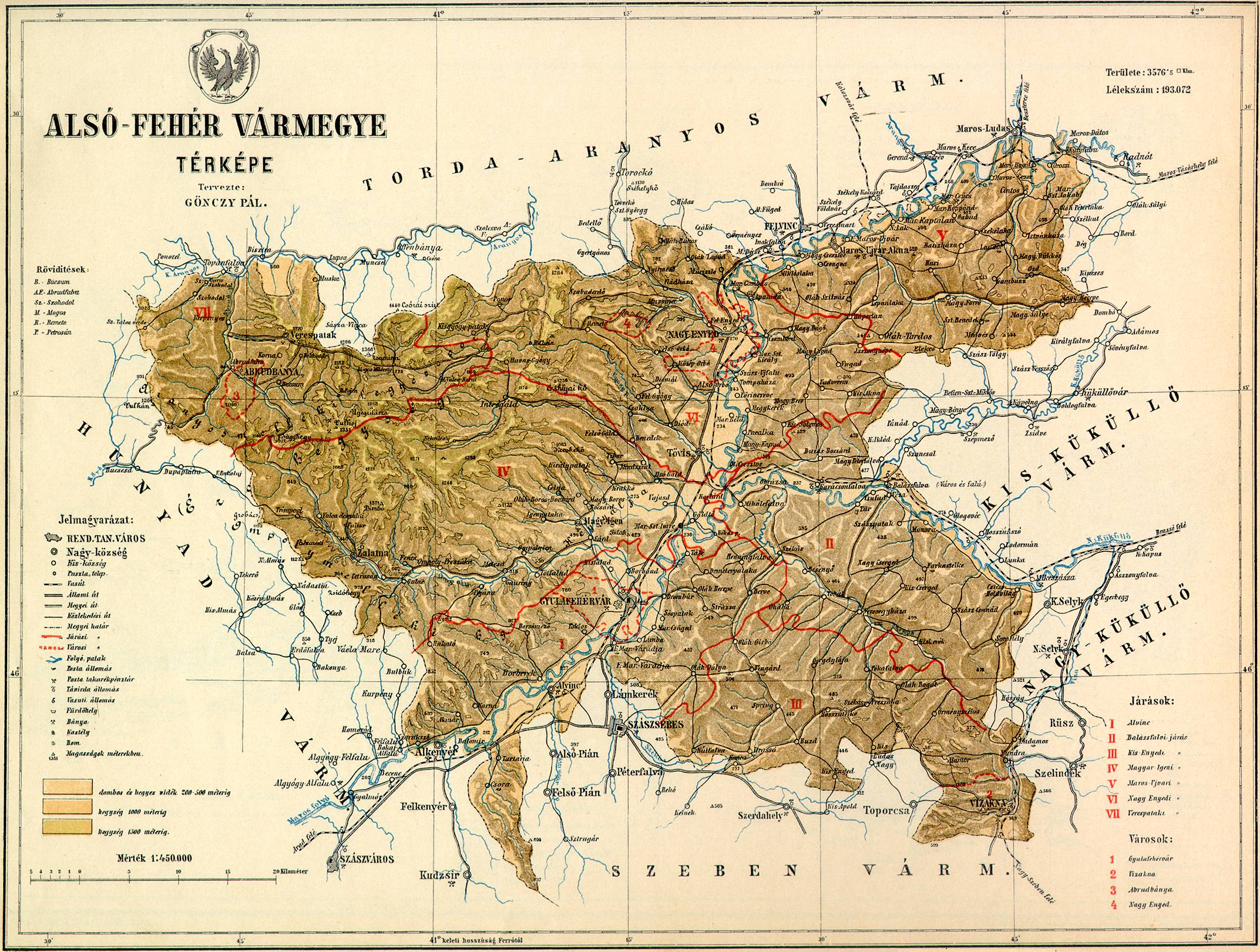
Map of Alsó-Fehér, 1891.

Alsó-Fehér county shared borders with Hunyad, Torda-Aranyos, Kis-Küküllő, Nagy-Küküllő and Szeben counties. The rivers Mureș and Târnava flowed through the county. Its area was 3,576.5 km^{2} around 1910.

== History ==
Alsó-Fehér (Lower Fehér) county was formed when Fehér county was split in 1744 (the other half, Felső-Fehér county, consisted entirely of enclaves between Székely and Saxon seats). In 1876, when the administrative structure of Transylvania was changed, the territory of Alsó-Fehér was modified and parts of it were annexed to the counties of Torda-Aranyos and Szeben (during the same administrative reform, Felső-Fehér county was entirely abolished and merged with other counties). In 1920, the Treaty of Trianon assigned the territory of the county to Romania. Its territory lies in the present Romanian counties of Alba, Sibiu (the south-east) and Mureș (a small northeastern part).

== Demographics ==
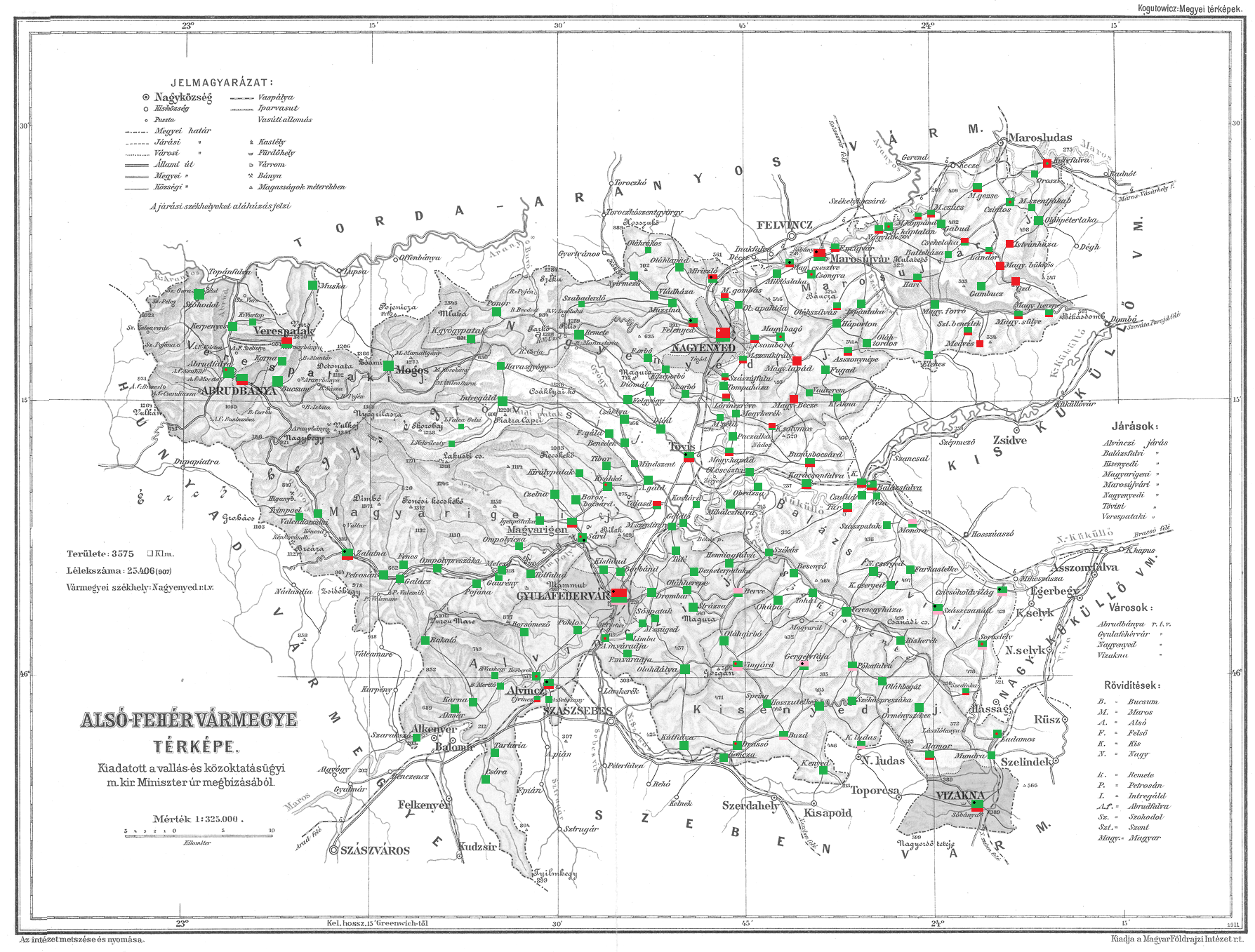
Ethnic map of the county with data of the 1910 census (see the key in the description)

Population by mother tongue (Note: Only linguistic communities > 1% are displayed.)
Census	Total	Romanian	Hungarian	German	Other or unknown
1880	178,021	135,439 (78.79%)	25,818 (15.02%)	6,972 (4.06%)	3,667 (2.13%)
1890	193,072	151,397 (78.41%)	30,181 (15.63%)	7,539 (3.90%)	3,955 (2.05%)
1900	212,352	166,099 (78.22%)	36,360 (17.12%)	7,953 (3.75%)	1,940 (0.91%)
1910	221,618	171,483 (77.38%)	39,107 (17.65%)	7,269 (3.28%)	3,759 (1.70%)

Population by religion (Note: Only religious communities > 1% are displayed.)
Census	Total	Eastern Orthodox	Greek Catholic	Calvinist	Roman Catholic	Lutheran	Jewish	Other or unknown
1880	178,021	76,165 (42.78%)	66,714 (37.48%)	16,834 (9.46%)	8,551 (4.80%)	5,961 (3.35%)	2,806 (1.58%)	990 (0.56%)
1890	193,072	80,353 (41.62%)	74,132 (38.40%)	19,472 (10.09%)	8,943 (4.63%)	5,813 (3.01%)	3,280 (1.70%)	1,079 (0.56%)
1900	212,352	87,210 (41.07%)	80,211 (37.77%)	21,296 (10.03%)	11,226 (5.29%)	7,170 (3.38%)	3,903 (1.84%)	1,336 (0.63%)
1910	221,618	89,724 (40.49%)	85,276 (38.48%)	23,009 (10.38%)	11,194 (5.05%)	7,283 (3.29%)	3,845 (1.73%)	1,287 (0.58%)

== Subdivisions ==
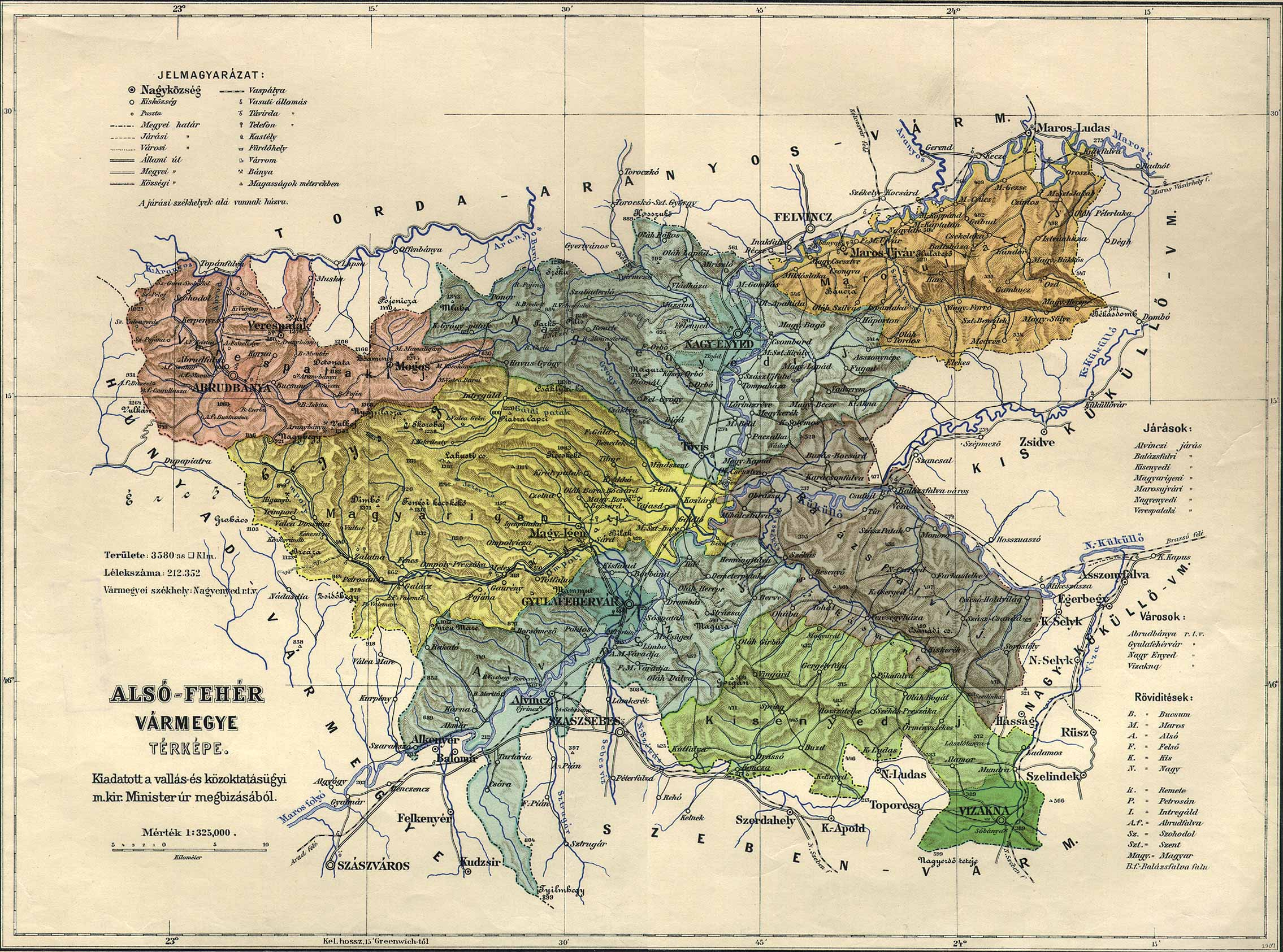

In the early 20th century, the subdivisions of Alsó-Fehér county were:

Districts (járás)
District	Capital
Alvinc	Alvinc (now Vințu de Jos)
Balázsfalva	Balázsfalva (now Blaj)
Kisenyed	Kisenyed (now Ocna Sibiului)
Magyarigen	Magyarigen (now Ighiu)
Marosújvár	Marosújvár (now Ocna Mureș)
Nagyenyed	Nagyenyed (now Aiud)
Tövis (from 1908)	Tövis (now Teiuș)
Verespatak	Verespatak (now Roșia Montană)
Urban districts (rendezett tanácsú városok)
Abrudbánya (now Abrud)
Gyulafehérvár (now Alba Iulia)
Nagyenyed (now Aiud)
Vízakna (now Ocna Sibiului)
