= István Kniezsa =

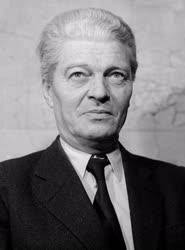
- Kniezsa on 15 March 1953, at the Kossuth Prize ceremony in Budapest
- Born: December 1, 1898; Trsztena, Kingdom of Hungary, (now Trstená, Slovakia)
- Died: March 15, 1965 (aged 66); Budapest
- Citizenship: Hungarian
- Education: Royal Hungarian Pázmány Péter University (1923–1928)
- Occupations: linguists; language historian; Slavists; university teacher
- Children: Veronika Kniezsa
- Awards: Kossuth Prize (1953)

István Kniezsa (1 December 1898, Trsztena, Austria-Hungary, now Trstená, Slovakia – 15 March 1965, Budapest, Hungary) was a Hungarian linguist and Slavist, corresponding (1939) and regular (1947) member of the Hungarian Academy of Sciences. He was one of the most significant figures in Hungarian language historical research in the 20th century, achieving significant scientific results in the study of place and personal names in the Carpathian Basin, in researching the medieval state and writing practice of the Hungarian language, as well as in the exploration of foreign words of Slavic origin. His major contribution was to the research of Slavic loanwords in the Hungarian language and toponymy. He was awarded by Kossuth Prize in 1953.

== Works ==
According to an investigation based on place-names in the medieval Kingdom of Hungary made by István Kniezsa, 511 settlements of Transylvania and Banat appear in documents at the end of the 13th century: 428 (83.8%) had names of Hungarian origin, and 3 (0.6%) had names of Romanian origin. Until 1400, total 1757 Transylvanian settlements are mentioned in documents which are still existing today: 1355 (77.1%) had names of Hungarian origin, and 76 (4.3%) had names of Romanian origin. (The other place names are of Slavic or German origin.) His study was first criticized by Romanian linguist and Slavist Emil Petrovici in 1944 in the political context of that time, although later he privately admitted in a political meeting in 1958 that Romanian place-names first appear in Transylvania in the 14th century.

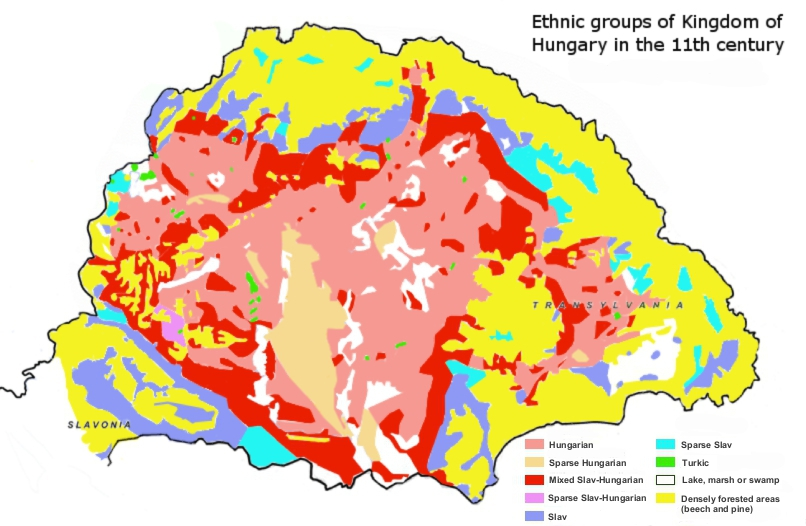
Kniezsa's (1938) view on the ethnic map of the Kingdom of Hungary in the 11th century, based on toponyms.

== Selected works ==
- A magyar helyesírás a tatárjárásig. Budapest, Magyar Nyelvtudományi Társaság, 1928, 32 p.
- A szlávok. Budapest, 1932. = Kincsestár, 26.
- Pseudorumänen in Pannonien und in den Nordkarpathen. Budapest, 1936. = Ostmitteleuropäische Bibliothek, 2.
- Magyarország népei a XI. században. in: Emlékkönyv Szent István király halálának 900. évfordulóján. Budapest, Franklin, 1938, 368–472.
- Cirillbetűs szláv szövegek nemzetközi tudományos átírása. Budapest, Országos Széchényi Könyvtár, 1939, 14 p.
- Az esztergomi káptalan 1156-i dézsmajegyzékének helységei. Századok 1939, 167–187.
- Adalékok a magyar–szlovák nyelvhatár történetéhez. Budapest, Athenaeum, 1941, 62 p.
- Erdély víznevei. 1942.
- Az Ecsedi-láp környékének szláv eredetű helynevei. Debrecen, 1943, 42 p.
- Nyelvészet és őstörténet. in: A magyarság őstörténete. Szerk. Ligeti Lajos. Budapest, 1943.
- Keletmagyarország helynevei. in: Magyarok és románok I–II. Szerk. Deér József & Gáldi László. Budapest, Athenaeum, 1943, 111–313.
- A párhuzamos helynévadás: Egy fejezet a településtörténet módszertanából. Budapest, Magyar Történettudományi Intézet, 1944, 59 p.
- A zobori apátság 1111. és 1113. évi oklevelei, mint nyelvi (nyelvjárási) emlékek. Debrecen, Debreceni Tudományegyetem, 1949, 52 p.
- A magyar helyesírás története. Budapest, Tankönyvkiadó, 1952, 29 p.
- Helyesírásunk története a könyvnyomtatás koráig. Budapest, Akadémiai, 1952, 204 p. = Nyelvészeti Tanulmányok.
- A magyar nyelv szláv jövevényszavai I/1–2. Budapest, Akadémiai, 1955.
- A magyar állami és jogi terminológia eredete. in: MTA Nyelv- és Irodalomtudományi Osztályának Közleményei 1955. 237–266.
- A magyar szlavisztika problémái és feladatai. in: MTA Nyelv- és Irodalomtudományi Osztályának Közleményei 1958. 69–124.
- A magyar és szlovák családnevek rendszere. Budapest, ELTE, 1965, 112 p.
- Az -i helynévképző a magyarban.
- Párhuzamos helynévadás.

== Bibliography ==
- Hadrovics László: Kniezsa István. in: Magyar Tudomány 1965.
- Kiss Lajos: Kniezsa István 1898–1965. in: Magyar Nyelvőr 1965.
- Kiss Lajos: Kniezsa István. Budapest, 1994.
- Kniezsa-hagyaték
