= Torda-Aranyos County =

Administrative county of the Kingdom of Hungary

Torda-Aranyos County Comitatus Tordensis-Aranyosiensis (Latin) Torda-Aranyos vármegye (Hungarian) Komitat Torda-Aranyos (German) Comitatul Turda-Arieş (Romanian)
- County of the Kingdom of Hungary
- 1876–1920
- Coat of arms

- Capital: Torda
- Area
  - Coordinates: 46°34′N 23°47′E
  - 1910: 3,514 km^{2} (1,357 sq mi)
- Population
  - 1910: 174,400
- History
  - Established: 1876
  - Treaty of Trianon: 4 June 1920
- Today part of: Romania
- Turda is the current name of the capital.

Torda-Aranyos was an administrative county (comitatus) of the Kingdom of Hungary. Its territory is now in central Romania (central Transylvania). The capital of the county was Torda (present-day Turda).

== Geography ==
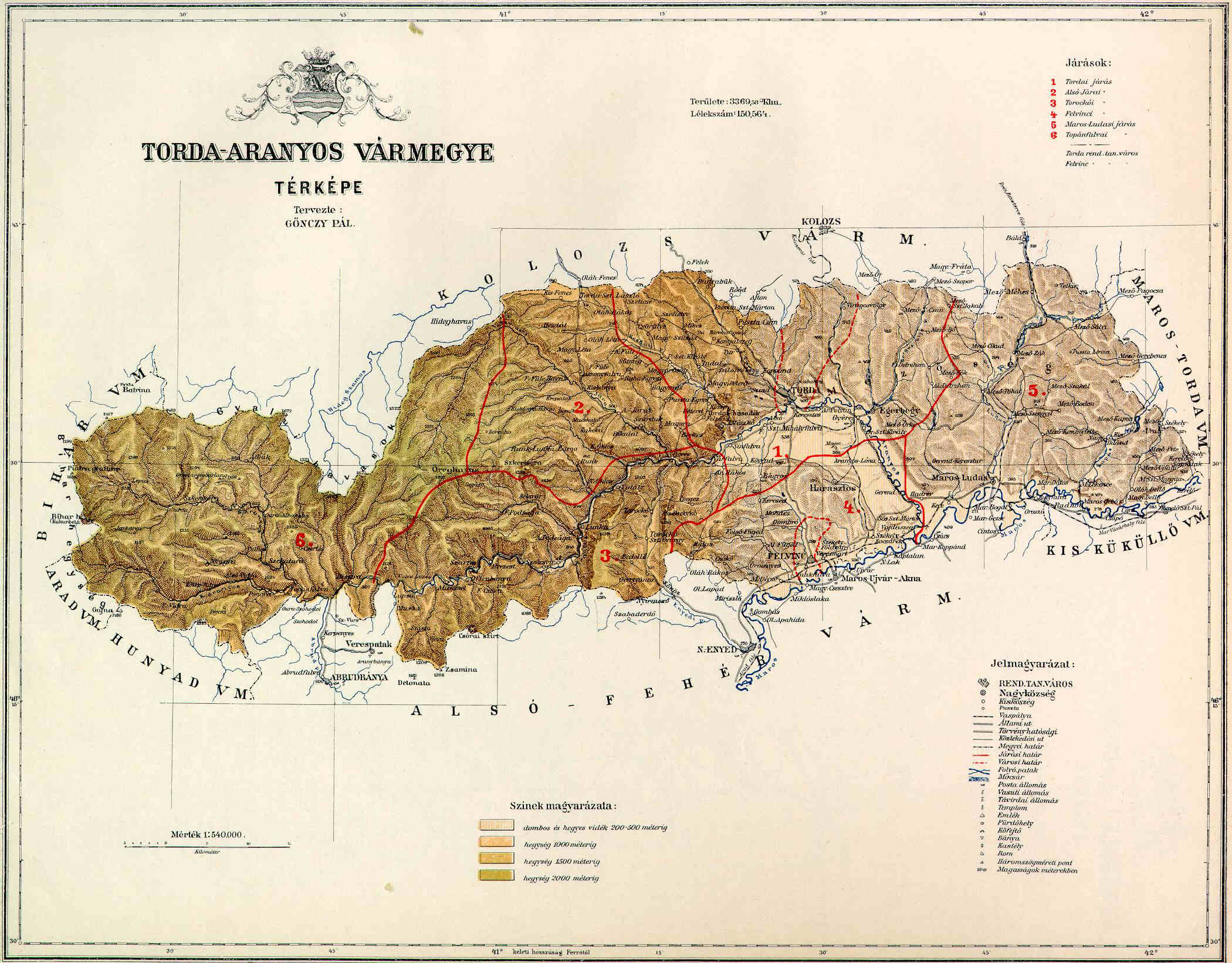
Map of Torda-Aranyos, 1891.

Torda-Aranyos county shared borders with the Hungarian counties Arad, Bihar, Kolozs, Maros-Torda, Kis-Küküllő, Alsó-Fehér and Hunyad. The rivers Mureș and Arieș flowed through the county. Its area was 3,514 km^{2} around 1910.

== History ==
Torda-Aranyos county was formed in 1876, when the western part of the Torda County and the Székely seat of Aranyosszék (plus small parts of Alsó-Fehér County) were united. In 1920, by the Treaty of Trianon, the county became part of Romania. Its territory lies in the present Romanian counties of Cluj (the north, including Turda), Alba (the south and west) and Mureș (the east).

== Demographics ==
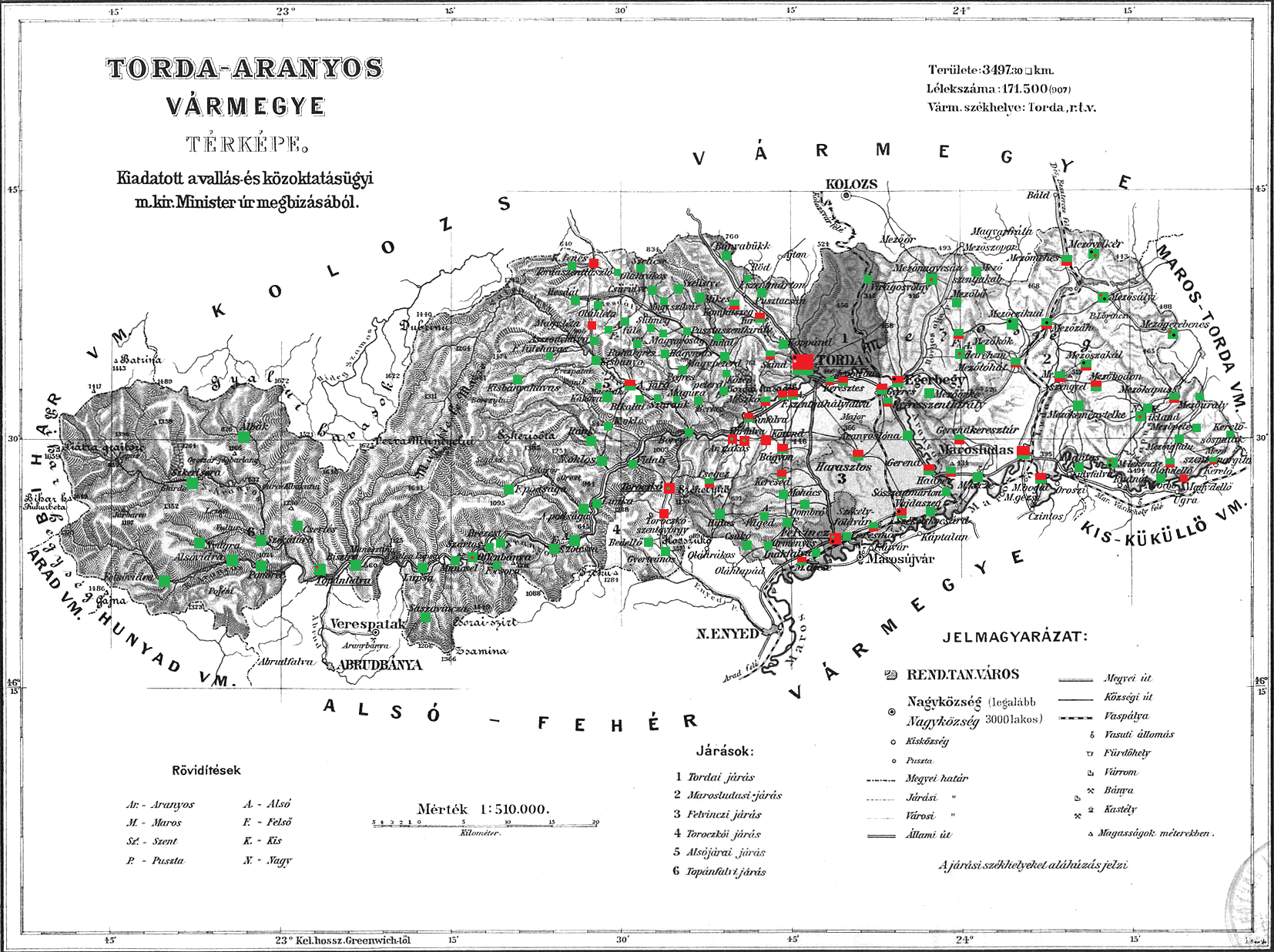
Ethnic map of the county with data of the 1910 census (see the key in the description)

Population by mother tongue (Note: Only linguistic communities > 1% are displayed.)
Census	Total	Romanian	Hungarian	Other or unknown
1880	137,031	96,809 (73.15%)	30,472 (23.02%)	5,063 (3.83%)
1890	150,564	107,491 (71.39%)	37,590 (24.97%)	5,483 (3.64%)
1900	160,579	116,833 (72.76%)	40,806 (25.41%)	2,940 (1.83%)
1910	174,375	125,668 (72.07%)	44,630 (25.59%)	4,077 (2.34%)

Population by religion (Note: Only religious communities > 1% are displayed.)
Census	Total	Greek Catholic	Eastern Orthodox	Calvinist	Unitarian	Roman Catholic	Jewish	Other or unknown
1880	137,031	56,169 (40.99%)	47,050 (34.34%)	18,781 (13.71%)	8,991 (6.56%)	4,390 (3.20%)	1,355 (0.99%)	295 (0.22%)
1890	150,564	62,023 (41.19%)	49,131 (32.63%)	22,506 (14.95%)	9,480 (6.30%)	5,253 (3.49%)	1,931 (1.28%)	240 (0.16%)
1900	160,579	66,293 (41.28%)	52,457 (32.67%)	23,607 (14.70%)	10,005 (6.23%)	5,490 (3.42%)	2,465 (1.54%)	262 (0.16%)
1910	174,375	72,672 (41.68%)	56,748 (32.54%)	25,526 (14.64%)	9,932 (5.70%)	6,539 (3.75%)	2,357 (1.35%)	310 (0.18%)

== Subdivisions ==
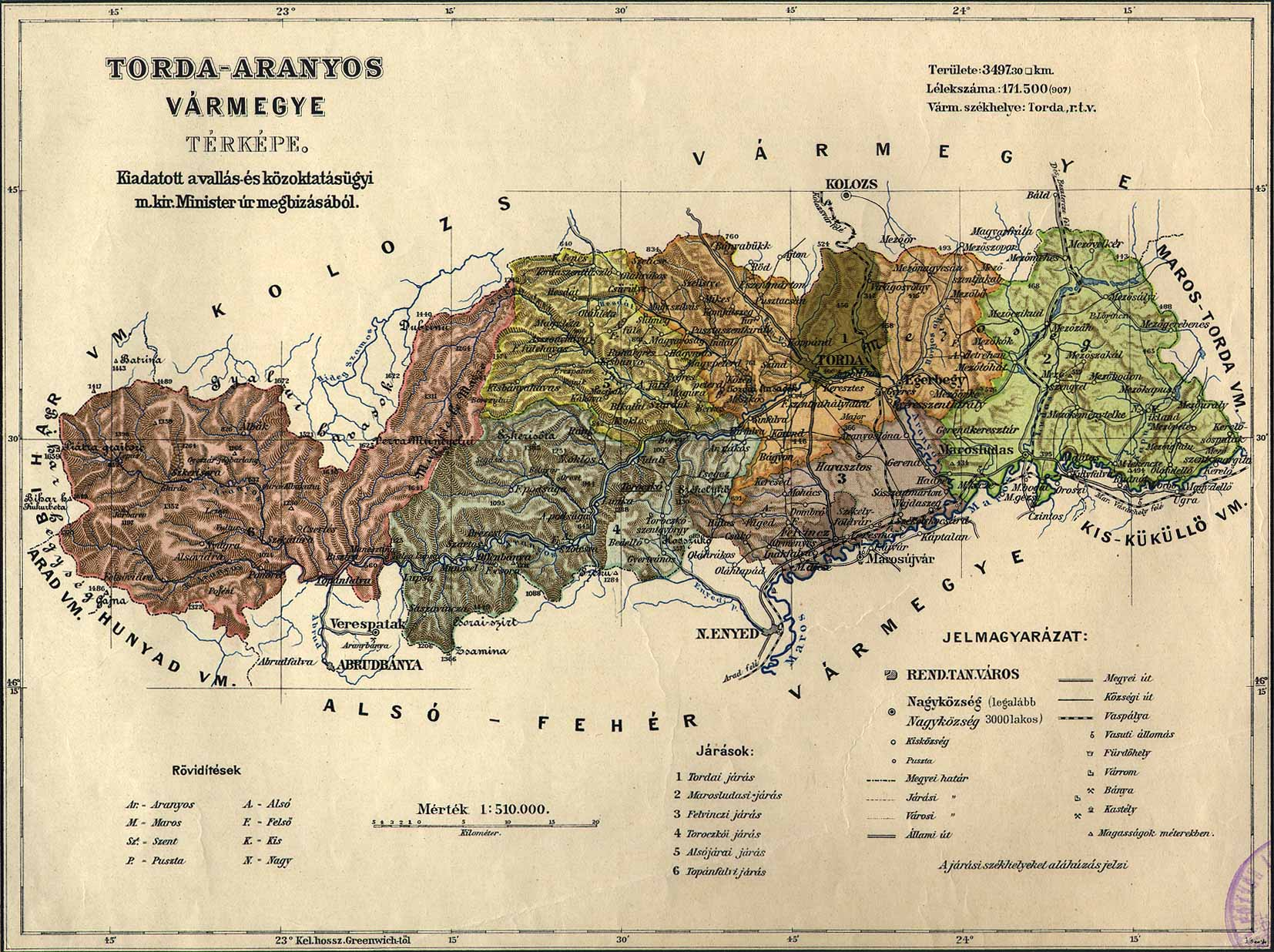

In the early 20th century, the subdivisions of Torda-Aranyos county were:

Districts (járás)
District	Capital
Alsójára	Alsójára (now Iara)
Felvinc	Felvinc (now Unirea)
Marosludas	Marosludas (now Luduș)
Topánfalva	Topánfalva (now Câmpeni)
Turda	Torda (now Turda)
Torockó	Torockó (now Rimetea)
Urban districts (rendezett tanácsú város)
Torda (now Turda)

== See also ==
- Torda County
