= Ormenis =

Ormenis may refer to:

- Ormeniș, municipality in Brașov County, Romania
- Ormeniș, village in Mirăslău municipality, Alba County, Romania
- Ormeniș, village in Viișoara municipality, Mureș County, Romania
- Ormenis, genus of insects in the family Flatidae
- Cladanthus, genus of flowering plants in the family Asteraceae
- Ormenis 199+69, 1969 documentary film by Markus Imhoof

== See also ==
- Ormeniș River (disambiguation)
- Urmeniș
- Örményes (disambiguation)
