= List of bishops of Făgăraș and Alba Iulia =

This is a list of Bishops of Făgăraș and Alba Iulia, who are the Primates of Romanian Greek Catholic Church.

== Bishop of Alba Iulia ==
- Atanasie Anghel (1698–1713)
  - vacant (1713–1715)

== Bishops of Făgăraș and Alba Iulia ==
- Ioan Giurgiu Patachi (1715–1727)
- Ioan Inocentiu Micu-Klein (1728–1751)
- Petru Pavel Aron (1752–1764)
- Atanasie Rednic (1765–1772)
- Grigore Maior (1772–1782)
- Ioan Bob (1783–1830)
  - vacant (1830–1832)
- Ioan Lemeni (1832–1850)

== Archbishops and Metropolitans of Făgăraș and Alba Iulia ==
- Alexandru Sterca-Șuluțiu (1850–1867)
- Ioan Vancea (1868–1892)
- Victor Mihaly de Apșa (1893–1918)
  - vacant (1918–1920)
- Vasile Suciu (1920–1935)
- Alexandru Nicolescu (1935–1941)
- Valeriu Traian Frențiu (1941–1946) (Apostolic Administrator)
- Ioan Suciu (1946–1948) (Apostolic Administrator)
  - vacant (1948–1990, the church was declared illegal by the Communist regime)
- Alexandru Todea (1990–1994), elevated to cardinal in 1991
- Lucian Mureșan (1994–2005) (elevated as Major Archbishop and Metropolitan in 2005), elevated to cardinal in 2012

== Major Archbishops and Metropolitans of Făgăraș and Alba Iulia ==
- Lucian Mureșan (2005–2025) (previously, Archbishop and Metropolitan, 1994–2005), elevated to cardinal in 2012
- Claudiu-Lucian Pop (since 2025)

== See also ==
- Romanian Catholic Major Archdiocese of Făgăraș and Alba Iulia

== Sources ==
- "Religious Leaders". rulers.org.
