= Ignațiu Darabant =

Romanian Greek Catholic hierarch

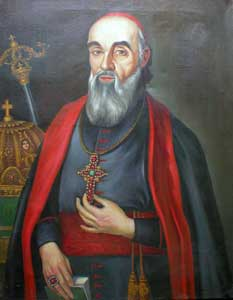
Bishop Ignațiu Darabant

Ignațiu Darabant, O.S.B.M. (26 October 1738 – 31 October 1805) was a Romanian Greek Catholic hierarch. He was bishop of the Romanian Catholic Eparchy of Oradea Mare from 1789 to 1805.

Born in Vicea, Maramureș, Habsburg monarchy (present day – Romania) in 1738, he was ordained a priest in June 1765 as a member of the Order of Saint Basil the Great. He was appointed the Bishop by the Holy See on 30 March 1789. He was consecrated to the Episcopate on 13 March 1790. The principal consecrator was Bishop Ioan Bob.

He died in Oradea (present day – Romania) on 31 October 1805.

Catholic Church titles
Preceded by Moise Dragoș	Romanian Catholic Eparchy of Oradea Mare; 1789–1805	Succeeded by Samuil Vulcan
