= Iuliu Hossu =

Romanian cardinal, martyr and blessed

His Eminence, Blessed Iuliu Hossu
- Bishop of Cluj-Gherla
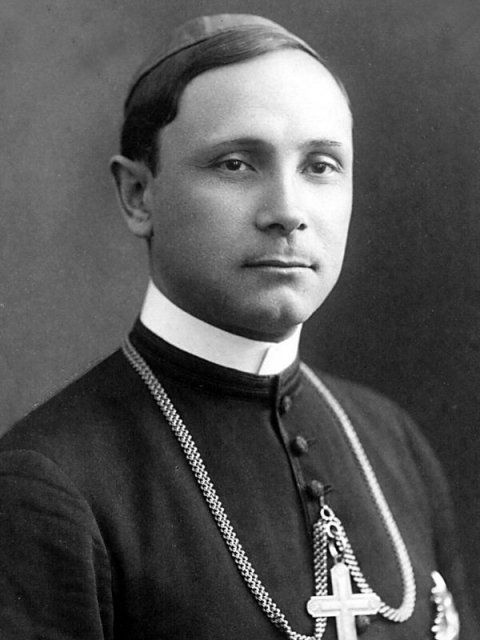
- Iuliu Hossu, c. 1920
- Church: Romanian Greek-Catholic Church
- Diocese: Cluj-Gherla
- See: Cluj-Gherla
- Appointed: 21 April 1917
- Term ended: 28 May 1970
- Predecessor: Vasile Hossu
- Successor: George Guțiu
- Previous posts: Apostolic Administrator of Maramureș (1930–1931); Apostolic Administrator of Oradea Mare (1941–1947)

Orders
- Ordination: 27 March 1910 by Vasile Hossu
- Consecration: 3 March 1917 by Victor Mihaly de Apșa
- Created cardinal: 28 April 1969 (in pectore); 5 March 1973 (revealed) by Pope Paul VI
- Rank: In pectore

Personal details
- Born: Iuliu Hossu; 30 January 1885 Milaș, Beszterce-Naszód County, Austria-Hungary
- Died: 28 May 1970 (aged 85) Colentina Hospital, Bucharest, Socialist Republic of Romania
- Buried: Bellu Cemetery, Bucharest
- Motto: Credința noastră este viața noastră (Our faith is our life)

Sainthood
- Feast day: 28 May
- Venerated in: Roman Catholic Church; Romanian Greek Catholic Church
- Title as Saint: Martyr
- Beatified: 2 June 2019; Liberty Field, Blaj, Romania by Pope Francis
- Attributes: Episcopal vestments Crown of martyrdom Martyr's palm
- Patronage: Romania; Persecuted Christians

Styles of Iuliu Hossu
- Reference style: His Eminence
- Spoken style: Your Eminence
- Religious style: Cardinal
- Posthumous style: Blessed
- Informal style: Cardinal
- See: Cluj-Gherla

Iuliu Hossu (30 January 1885 – 28 May 1970) was a Romanian Greek-Catholic prelate who served as the Bishop of Cluj-Gherla. Pope Paul VI elevated Hossu to the rank of cardinal in pectore, that is, secretly, in 1969 but did not publish his appointment until after Hossu's death. The Communist authorities arrested Hossu on 28 October 1948. From 1950 to 1955 he was detained as political prisoner at the Sighet Prison. He spent the rest of his life under house arrest and died in 1970. He is venerated in the Catholic Church as a martyr and blessed, having been beatified by Pope Francis.

== Life ==
=== Education and priesthood ===
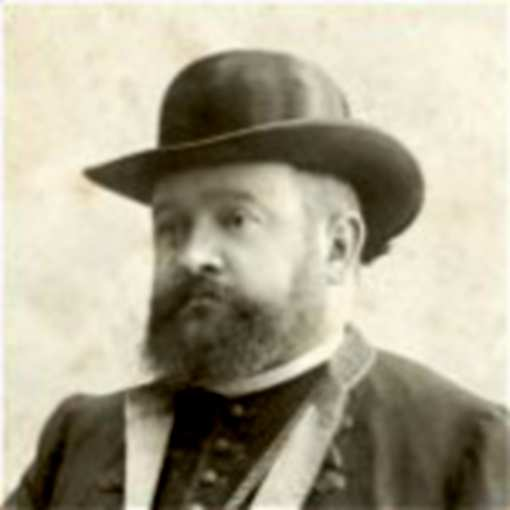
His uncle Vasile who ordained him as a priest.

Iuliu Hossu was born in 1885 in Milaș in the then-Austro-Hungarian empire to Ioan Hossu (1856–?) and Victoria Măriuțiu. His brothers were Vasile (a barrister) and Traian (a doctor) and Ioan (an engineer). His paternal grandparents were Vasile Hossu (1831–1889) and Maria Sebeni; his paternal cousin was Iustin Hossu. A nephew was Stefan Hossu. His paternal aunts were Alecsa and Nicolae Hossu (1859–1914). His great-grandfather was Iosif Hossu (1822–46) and before him were Nicolae (1768–1841) and Petre (c. 1525).

Hossu studied at the ecclesial school in Cluj and later in Budapest. His grade four studies were overseen at a Roman Catholic school in Târgu Mureș while grade five to eight was spent at a Greek-Catholic school in Blaj. He also studied at the University of Vienna in Austria and later at the Pontifical Urban University in Rome where he went on to obtain doctorates in philosophical studies in 1906 and in theological studies in 1908.

His uncle Vasile Hossu (30.01.1866–13.01.1916) ordained him to the priesthood on 27 March 1910. He completed further studies from 1910 to 1911 and served as an archivist and a librarian. From 1911 to 1914 he served as the personal aide to the Bishop of Gherla (his uncle Vasile) and became friends with Prime Minister István Tisza. He later served as a chaplain to the Romanian soldiers in the Austro-Hungarian armed forces during World War I between 1914 and 1917. His brothers Vasile and Traian were mobilized as soldiers during the war while his brother Ioan was made a rail officer at the Oradea station. His cousin Iustin fought and died on the Serbian front. The death of his cousin prompted him to join as a chaplain so the new lieutenant left in December 1914 from Timișoara to Vienna where he tended to the soldiers.

=== Episcopate ===
==== Austria-Hungary ====
Pope Benedict XV appointed him as the Bishop of Gherla on 17 April 1917 and he received his episcopal consecration on 4 December 1917; the Blessed Karl I nominated him for the position on 3 March and forwarded it to the pope for his confirmation.

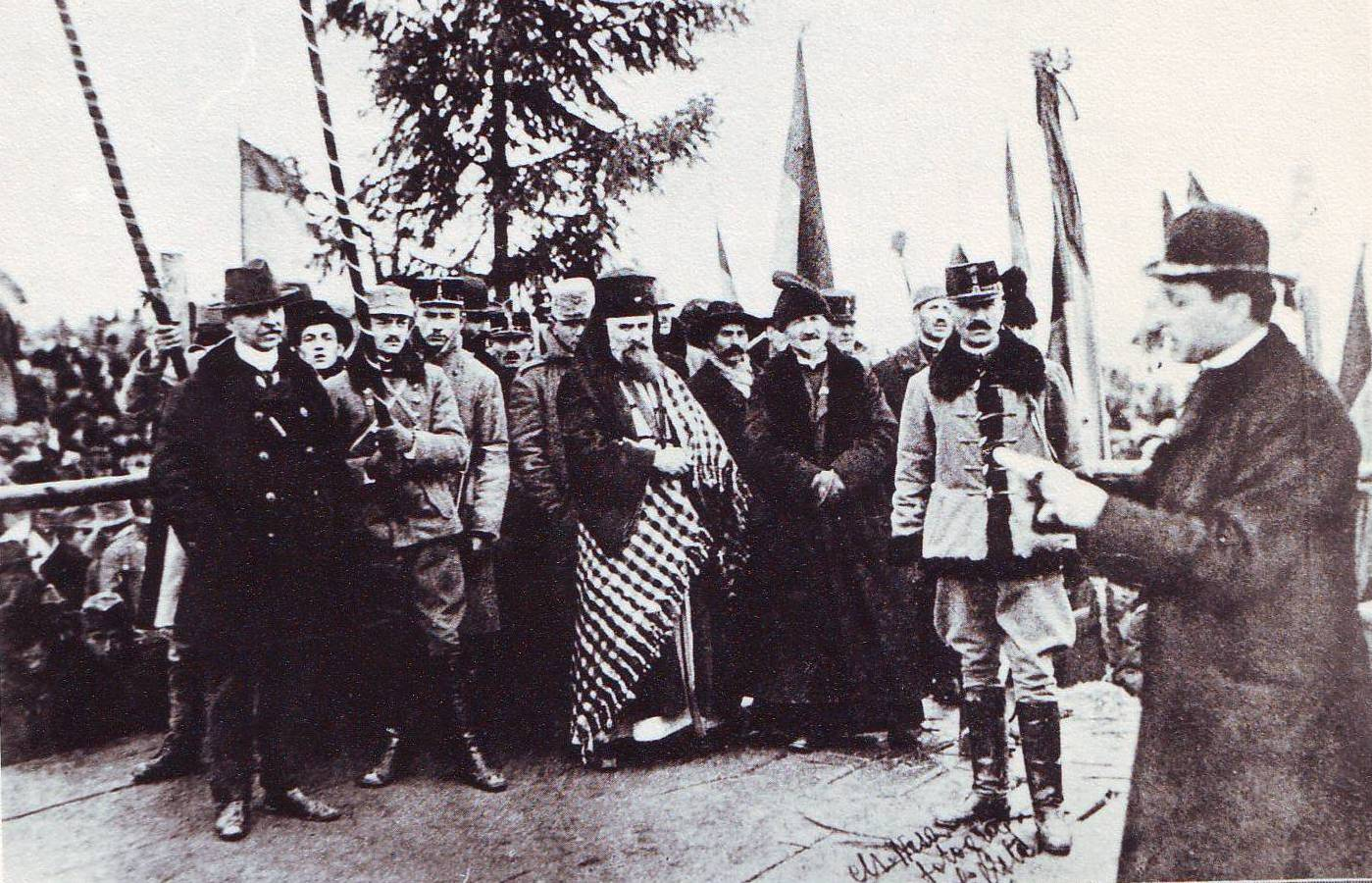
Iuliu Hossu (right) reading in Alba Iulia the Declaration of Alba Iulia on 1 December 1918

==== Great National Assembly of Alba Iulia ====
In November 1918 Hossu was nominated representative by right in the National Assembly of all Romanians in Hungary, which declared the Union of Transylvania with Romania on 1 December 1918. On 1 December 1918 Hossu read the Resolution of the National Assembly in front of the crowds gathered in Alba Iulia, preceding it with the following words: "Brethren, the hour of fulfillment is this one, when God Almighty is speaking out His centuries-old longing for justice through His faithful people. Today, by our decision, Greater Romania is achieved, one and indivisible, all Romanians from these lands happily calling: We are joining forever our Motherland, Romania! [..] Justice has prevailed". Next day, at Iuliu Maniu's proposal, the High National Romanian Council mandated representatives Vasile Goldiș, Alexandru Vaida-Voevod, Iuliu Hossu, and Miron Cristea to go to King Ferdinand I and present him with the Resolution of the National Assembly.

==== Kingdom of Romania ====
Hossu was named as the Bishop of Cluj-Gherla when the see was transferred on 5 June 1930 and Pope Pius XI later appointed him as the Apostolic Administrator of Maramureș from 1930 until 1931 when a successor for that diocese was named. Hossu was named an Assistant at the Pontifical Throne on 16 September 1936 which made him a monsignor. He also made the Apostolic Administrator of Oradea Mare from 1941 until 1947 when Pope Pius XII appointed him as such.

==== Communist repression, forced attempts at union with Orthodox Church ====
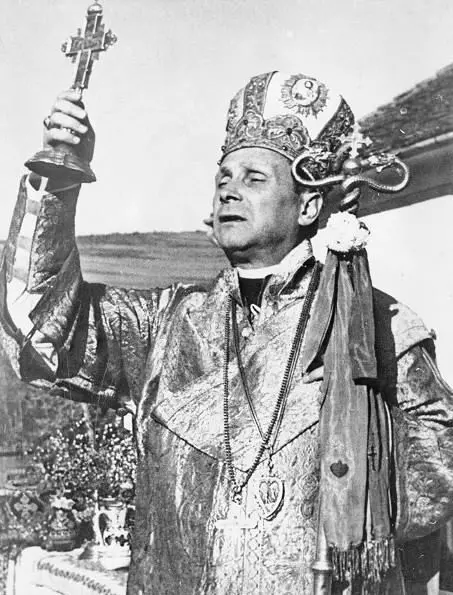
Bishop Iuliu Hossu in the 1930s

For his opposition to the government, he was forced to flee his diocese on 28 October 1948 but was soon arrested. He was confined at Jilava Prison and Dragoslavele and later at Sighet and Gherla prisons from 1948 to 1964. He was relocated to a convent near Bucharest from that point until 1970, and was transferred to a hospital there in May 1970.

Hossu opposed the forced passage of Greek-Catholic believers to the Romanian Orthodox Church. On 1 October 1948 he gave an Exclamation Decree (ipso facto) to the participants in the Cluj Assembly of the 36 Greek Catholic priests who would decide to break the Greek-Catholic union with the Church of Rome. On 28 October 1948, Hossu was arrested in his episcopal residence in Cluj and taken to the patriarchal villa of Dragoslavele, where he was held under guard in hunger and cold together with the other Greek-Catholic bishops arrested. Both the communist authorities and the leadership of the Romanian Orthodox Church represented by Patriarch Justinian Marina personally offered him the Orthodox metropolitan chair of Moldavia in exchange for renouncing the Catholic faith and the connection with Rome and Catholic Church. Refusing to convert to Orthodoxy, Hossu was first transferred to Căldărușani Monastery, and in 1950 to the Sighet Penitentiary. In 1955 he was taken to Curtea de Argeș, and in 1956 to the Ciorogârla Monastery.

Following the Greek-Catholic Liturgy celebrated at the Church of the Piarists in Cluj on 12 August 1956 by the three united bishops alive at the time, they were dispersed from Ciorogârla. During his forced domicile at Ciorogârla Monastery, Hossu was regularly visited by Orthodox hierarchs, including Justinian Marina, Teoctist Arăpașu and Gherasim Cristea.

Hossu arrived again in Căldăruşani, where he stayed with compulsory residence until the end of his life. According to the memoirs of the Greek-Catholic priest Ioan Mitrofan, Andrei Andreicuţ was also among those who visited Hossu in Căldărușani.

=== Cardinal ===
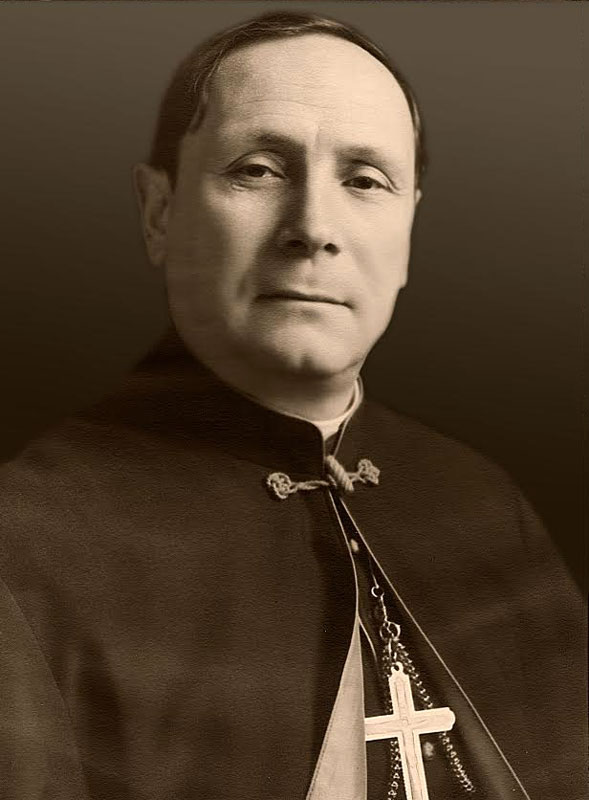
Iuliu Hossu

On 28 April 1969 he was created a cardinal but Pope Paul VI reserved Hossu in pectore (to be kept secret). His elevation to the rank of cardinal was announced on 5 March 1973, after Hossu's death. On 22 February 1969 the pope had granted a private audience to Hieronymus Menges and the prelate asked Paul VI to do something that would encourage the faithful and give them a sign that the Romanian people were close to his heart. Paul VI asked: "what?" The prelate then recommended that the pope raise Hossu and future Servant of God Áron Márton as cardinals and to appoint some priests as monsignors. Archbishop Agostino Casaroli sent his aide not long after this to Bucharest to ask the Minister for Culture whether or not the government would accept the two promotions. The government agreed to accept Márton but not Hossu as a cardinal. Márton learned of this and refused the honor when he learned that the government had rejected Hossu's appointment, with the result that Paul reserved Hossu in pectore and did not make Márton a cardinal.

=== Death ===
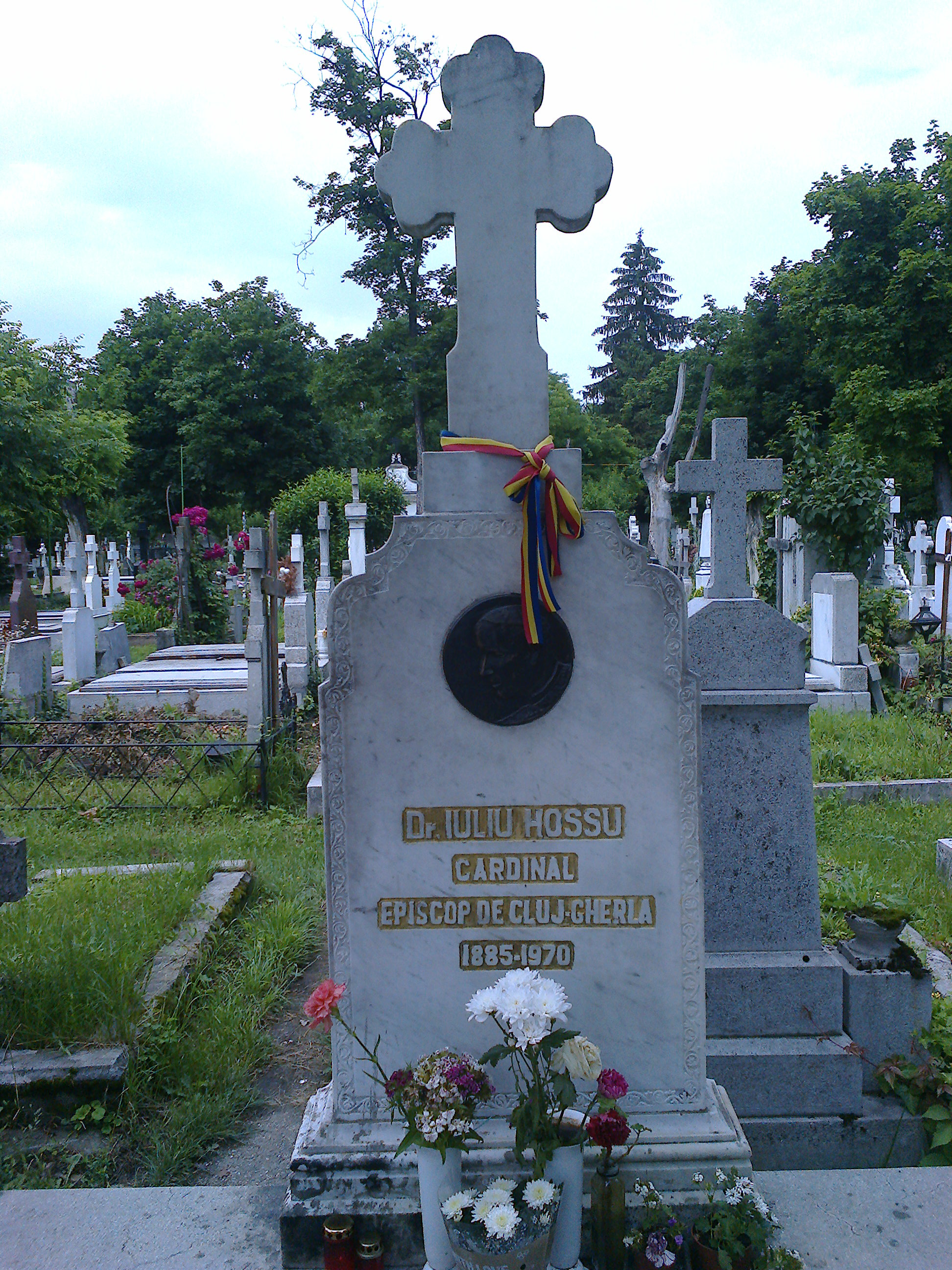
Hossu's tomb at Bellu Cemetery

Hossu died on 28 May 1970 at 9:00am at Colentina Hospital in Bucharest with Bishop Alexandru Todea at his side. He was buried in Bucharest and his last words were recorded as being: "My struggle ends; yours continues". On 7 December 1982 his remains were exhumed and transferred. His burial place is at the Catholic Bellu Cemetery in Bucharest.

== Cause of beatification and canonization ==
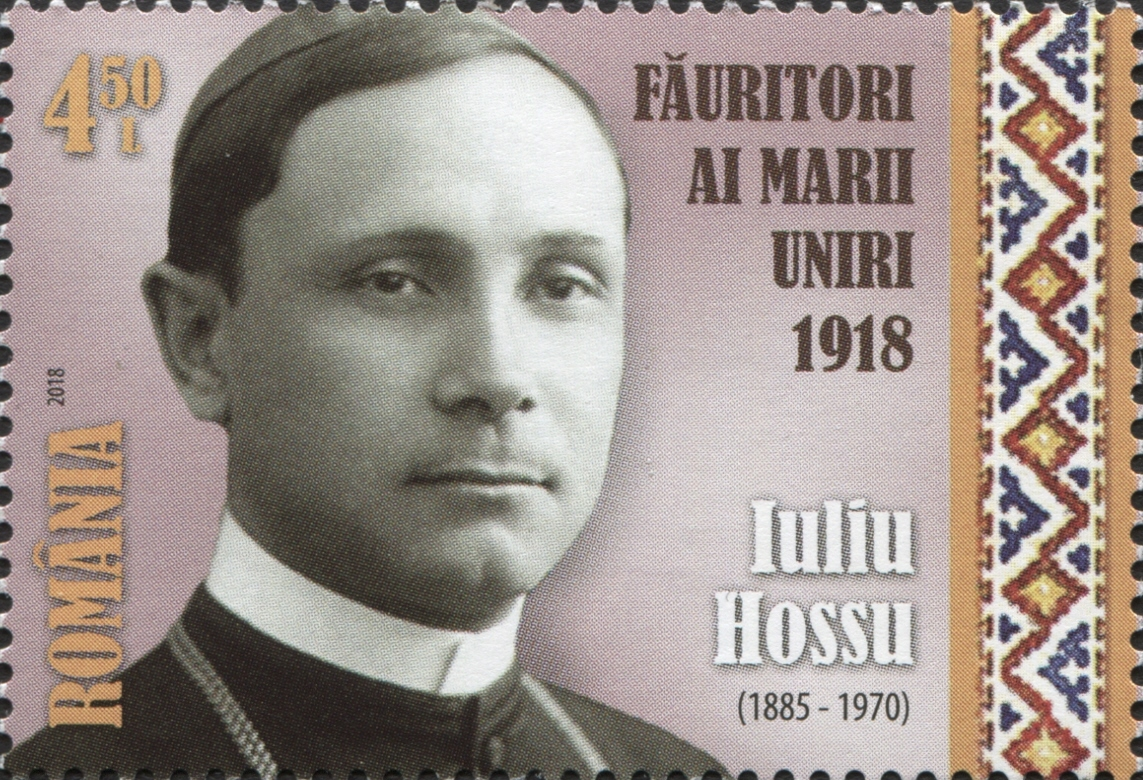
Hossu on a 2018 Romanian stamp.

The beatification process – which conferred the title Servant of God upon him – commenced with the declaration of "nihil obstat" (nothing against) to the cause on 28 January 1997. The eparchial process delved into his life (and that of six other prelates in the joint cause) through the collection of documentation and testimonies. This process spanned from 16 January 1997 until 10 March 2009. The end of this local process saw all the findings taken in boxes to the Congregation for the Causes of Saints in Rome who validated the process on 18 February 2011. The relator was appointed on 27 May 2011 and helps in drafting the Positio dossier with the cause's officials. The dossier was submitted to the C.C.S. in April 2018. All nine theologians voted in favor of the cause in January 2019 and the C.C.S. also voted in favor of it over a month later. Pope Francis confirmed the cause on 19 March 2019 for Hossu and the other six prelates which allows for them to be beatified.

On 25 March 2019, it was confirmed that Pope Francis would beatify Hossu and the other prelates. On 2 June, Pope Francis personally presided over the beatification of Hossu and the six other prelates at Blaj Romania's Liberty Field during his papal trip to Romania.

In June of 2025, Pope Leo XIV honored Hossu at a ceremony in the Sistine Chapel, along with a delegation from the Romanian Greek Catholic Church and Romanian Jews.

== Legacy ==
Iuliu Hossu's life was the subject of the film "The Cardinal" (2019). A street in downtown Cluj-Napoca is named after him.

The Cathedral of the Entry of the Virgin Mary into the Temple, in Gherla, where Iuliu Hossu served, has been owned by the Romanian Orthodox Church since 1948. As of 2026, it has not been returned to the Greek Catholic community.
