= Vasile Hossu (bishop of Gherla) =

Romanian Greek Catholic hierarch

- Eparch of Gherla, Armenopoli, Szamos-Ujvár
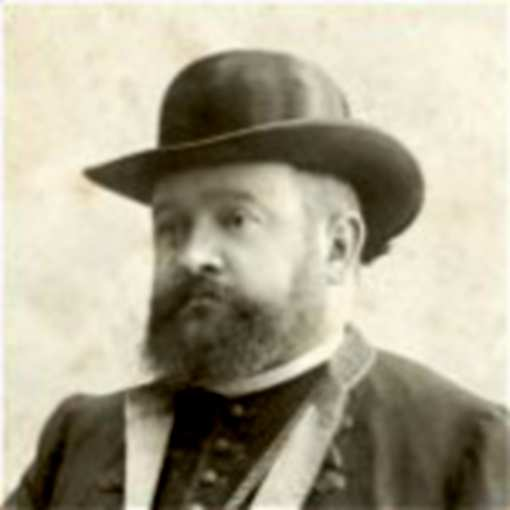
- Church: Romanian Greek Catholic Church
- Diocese: Eparchy of Gherla, Armenopoli, Szamos-Ujvár
- In office: 16 December 1911 – 13 January 1916
- Predecessor: Ioan Sabo
- Successor: Iuliu Hossu
- Previous post: Eparch of Lugoj (1903-1911)

Orders
- Ordination: 27 August 1888 by Ioan Vancea
- Consecration: 21 September 1903 by Victor Mihaly de Apșa

Personal details
- Born: 30 January 1866 Neumarkt am Mieresch, Marosszék, Kingdom of Hungary, Austrian Empire
- Died: 13 January 1916 (aged 49) Budapest, Transleithania, Austria-Hungary

Vasile Hossu (30 January 1866 – 13 January 1916) was a Romanian Greek Catholic hierarch. He was bishop of the Romanian Catholic Eparchy of Lugoj from 1903 to 1911 and the Romanian Catholic Eparchy of Gherla, Armenopoli, Szamos-Ujvár from 1911 to 1916.

Born in Neumarkt am Mieresch, Austrian Empire (present-day Târgu Mureș, Romania) in 1866, he was ordained a priest on 27 August 1888. He was appointed the Bishop by the Holy See on 25 June 1903. He was consecrated to the Episcopate on 21 September 1903. The principal consecrator was Archbishop Victor Mihaly de Apșa and co-consecrators were Bishop Ioan Sabo and Bishop Demetriu Radu.

He died in Budapest, Austria-Hungary on 13 January 1916.

Catholic Church titles
Preceded by Demetriu Radu	Romanian Catholic Eparchy of Lugoj; 1903–1911	Succeeded by Valeriu Traian Frențiu
Preceded by Ioan Sabo	Romanian Catholic Eparchy of Gherla, Armenopoli, Szamos-Ujvár; 1911–1916	Succeeded by Iuliu Hossu
