= Bercea =

Bercea may refer to:

- Bercea, Sălaj County, a village in Sălaj County, Romania
- Marius Bercea, Romanian contemporary artist
- Virgil Bercea, Romanian Greek-Catholic bishop
