= Milaș =

- Commune
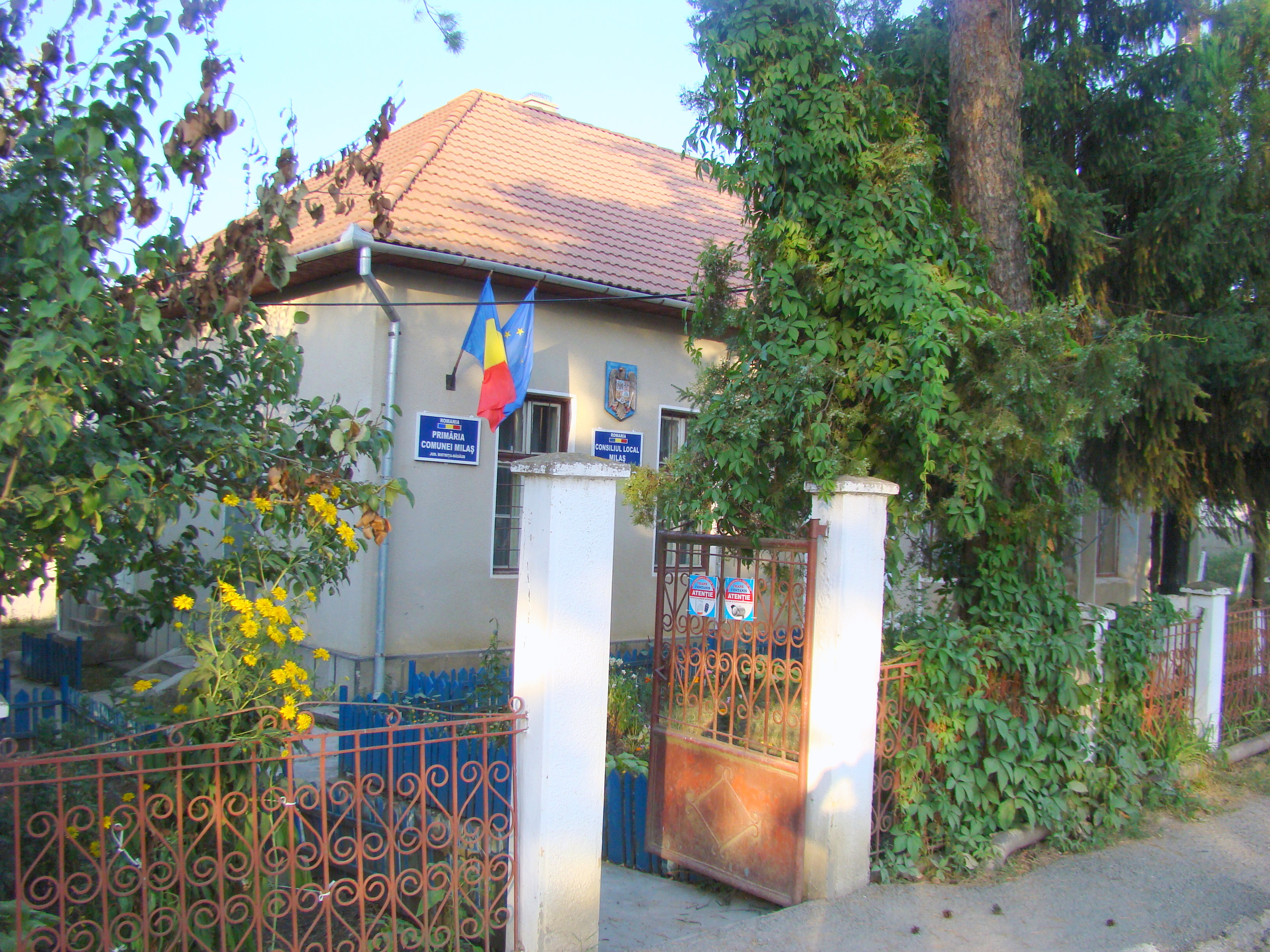
- Milaș town hall

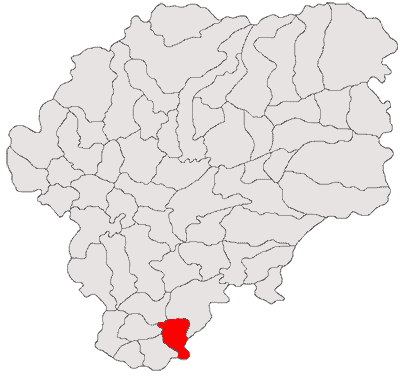
- Location in Bistrița-Năsăud County

- Location in Romania
- Coordinates: 46°49′N 24°26′E
- Country: Romania
- County: Bistrița-Năsăud

Government
  - Mayor (2020–2024): Iosif Gabor (PSD)
- Area: 49.33 km^{2} (19.05 sq mi)
- Elevation: 378 m (1,240 ft)
- Population (2021-12-01): 1,190
  - Density: 24.1/km^{2} (62.5/sq mi)
- Time zone: UTC+02:00 (EET)
  - Summer (DST): UTC+03:00 (EEST)
- Postal code: 427165
- Area code: (+40) 02 63
- Vehicle reg.: BN
- Website: comunamilas.ro

Milaș (Hungarian: Nagynyulas, Nyulas; German: Hasendorf) is a commune in Bistrița-Năsăud County, Transylvania, Romania.

It is composed of six villages: Comlod (Komlód; German: Komeloden), După Deal (Hegymögött; German: Hütte), Ghemeș (Gémestanya; German: Gemmesch), Hirean (Hirántanya; German: Hirenhof), Milaș, and Orosfaia (Oroszfája; German: Reusswald or Russenwald or Russholz).

The commune sits on the Transylvanian Plateau, at an altitude of 378 m (1,240 ft). It is located at the southern extremity of the county, 47 km (29 mi) from the county seat, Bistrița, on the border with Mureș County.

Built in 1756, the Teleki Castle from Comlod is one of the 11 castles in Bistrița-Năsăud County declared historical monuments by the Romanian Ministry of Culture.

Historical population
Year	Pop.	±%
1850	2,251	—
1930	3,085	+37.1%
1956	3,601	+16.7%
2002	1,559	−56.7%
2011	1,286	−17.5%
2021	1,190	−7.5%
Source: Census data

== Natives ==
- Iuliu Hossu (1885–1970), Greek Catholic prelate who served as the Bishop of Cluj-Gherla and was persecuted by the Communist authorities. He was beatified in 2019 by Pope Francis.
