= Alexandru Dobra =

Romanian Greek Catholic hierarch

- Eparch of Lugoj
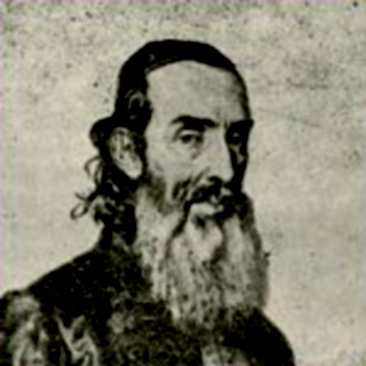
- Church: Romanian Greek Catholic Church
- Diocese: Eparchy of Lugoj
- In office: 16 November 1854 – 13 April 1870
- Predecessor: Eparchy erected
- Successor: Ioan Olteanu

Orders
- Ordination: 1 November 1818
- Consecration: 28 October 1855 by Alexandru Sterca-Șuluțiu

Personal details
- Born: 15 February 1794 Septér (north of present-day Urmeniș), Grand Principality of Transylvania, Habsburg Empire
- Died: 13 April 1870 (aged 76) Lugoj, Krassó County, Transleithania, Austria-Hungary

Alexandru Dobra (15 February 1794 – 13 April 1870) was a Romanian Greek Catholic hierarch. He was the first bishop of the new created Romanian Catholic Eparchy of Lugoj from 1854 to 1870.

Born in Șopteriu, Bistrița-Năsăud, Habsburg monarchy (present day – Romania) in 1794, he was ordained a priest on 1 November 1818. He was confirmed the Bishop by the Holy See on 16 November 1854. He was consecrated to the Episcopate on 28 October 1855. The principal consecrator was Archbishop Alexandru Sterca-Șuluțiu, the co-consecrators were Bishop Vasile Erdeli and Bishop Angelo Parsi.

He died in Lugoj (present day – Romania) on 13 April 1870.

Catholic Church titles
New title	Romanian Catholic Eparchy of Lugoj; 1854–1870	Succeeded by Ioan Olteanu
