= Ioan Lemeni =

Ethnic Romanian prelate (1780–1861)

- Primate of the Romanian Greek Catholic Church
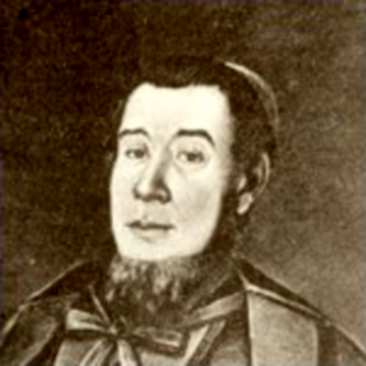
- Church: Romanian Greek Catholic Church
- Diocese: Diocese of Făgăraş
- Installed: 14 July 1833
- Term ended: March 1850
- Predecessor: Ioan Bob
- Successor: Alexandru Sterca-Șuluțiu

Orders
- Ordination: 1 October 1805 (Priest)
- Consecration: 6 June 1833 (Bishop) by Samuil Vulcan

Personal details
- Born: 22 April 1780 Dezmir
- Died: 29 March 1861 (aged 80) Vienna

Ioan Lemeni (Hungarian: Lemény János; 22 April 1780 – 29 March 1861) was an ethnic Romanian prelate in the Kingdom of Hungary, who served as Bishop of Făgăraş and Primate of the Romanian Greek Catholic Church from 1833 to his resignation in 1850.

== Life ==
Ioan Lemeni was born on 22 April 1780 in Dezmér, Transylvania, Royal Hungary. He was ordained a priest on 1 October 1805. After two years of didactic career at Blaj, as Professor of Philosophy and Church History, in 1807 he was appointed parish and protopop of Cluj. He was archpriest of Cluj and, after 1829, secretary of the bishop of Făgăraş-Alba Iulia Ioan Bob to who he succeeded on 23 August 1832.

His appointment to the Diocese of Făgăraş, i.e. Primate of the Church, was confirmed by Pope Gregory XVI on 16 Apr 1833, so becoming the Primate of the Romanian Greek Catholic Church. Because he was not yet a bishop, he was consecrated a Bishop on 6 June 1833 by Samuil Vulcan, bishop of the Diocese of Oradea Mare.

The press of that period attests that he was able to preach even four times a day. Usually, his sermons were elaborated in Hungarian, Ioan Lemeni being seriously criticized by a part of Romanian historians who ignored the specific historical context from that time. In 1845 after a long and bitter dispute, Ioan Lemeni dismissed Simion Bărnuțiu from Blaj.

Together with the Orthodox Bishop Andrei Şaguna he had a role in the Hungarian Revolution of 1848 supporting the union of Transylvania with Hungary and so opposing the Austrian government. For this reason, as required by the Austrian government, he had to resign in March 1850.

After his resignation, he went to Vienna, where he died on 29 March 1861.
