= Rednic =

Rednic is a Romanian surname. Notable people with the surname include:

- Atanasie Rednic (1722–1772), Romanian bishop
- Daniel Rednic (born 1978), Romanian football player
- Mircea Rednic (born 1962), Romanian football manager and former defender
