= Mihail Pavel =

Romanian Greek Catholic hierarch

- Eparch of Oradea Mare
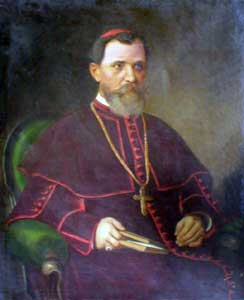
- Church: Catholic Church
- Diocese: Eparchy of Oradea Mare
- In office: 15 May 1879 – 1 June 1902
- Predecessor: Ioan Olteanu
- Successor: Demetriu Radu
- Previous post: Eparch of Gherla, Armenopoli, Szamos-Ujvár (1872-1879)

Orders
- Ordination: 21 March 1852
- Consecration: 26 January 1873 by Ioan Vancea

Personal details
- Born: 6 September 1827 Lénárdfalva, Szatmár County, Kingdom of Hungary, Austrian Empire
- Died: 1 June 1902 (aged 74) Aknaszlatina, Máramaros County, Transleithania, Austria-Hungary

Mihail Pavel (6 September 1827 – 1 June 1902) was a Romanian Greek Catholic hierarch. He was bishop of the Romanian Catholic Eparchy of Gherla, Armenopoli, Szamos-Ujvár from 1872 to 1879 and the Romanian Catholic Eparchy of Oradea Mare from 1879 to 1902.

Born in Recea, Maramureș, Austrian Empire (present day – Romania) in 1827, he was ordained a priest on 21 March 1852. He was confirmed the Bishop by the Holy See on 23 December 1872. He was consecrated to the Episcopate on 26 January 1873. The principal consecrator was Archbishop Ioan Vancea.

He died in Solotvyno (present day – Ukraine) on 1 June 1902.

Catholic Church titles
Preceded by Ioan Vancea	Romanian Catholic Eparchy of Gherla, Armenopoli, Szamos-Ujvár; 1872–1879	Succeeded by Ioan Sabo
Preceded by Ioan Olteanu	Romanian Catholic Eparchy of Oradea Mare; 1879–1902	Succeeded by Demetriu Radu
