= Ioan Alexi =

Romanian philologist, bishop

- Eparch of Gherla, Armenopoli, Szamos-Ujvár
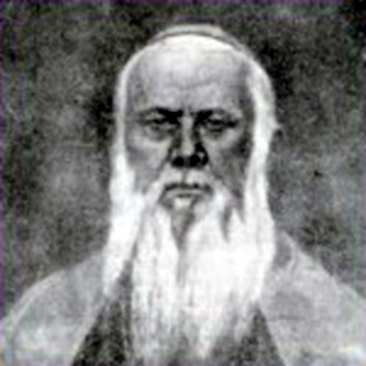
- Church: Romanian Greek Catholic Church
- Diocese: Eparchy of Gherla, Armenopoli, Szamos-Ujvár
- In office: 16 November 1854 – 29 June 1863
- Predecessor: Eparchy erected
- Successor: Ioan Vancea

Orders
- Ordination: 30 October 1825 by Samuil Vulcan
- Consecration: 28 October 1855 by Alexandru Sterca-Șuluțiu

Personal details
- Born: 24 June 1800 Maladé (northwest of present-day Șimleu Silvaniei), Kraszna County, Grand Principality of Transylvania, Kingdom of Hungary, Habsburg monarchy
- Died: 29 June 1863 (aged 63) Szamosújvár, Doboka County, Grand Principality of Transylvania, Kingdom of Hungary, Austrian Empire

Ioan Alexi (24 June 1800 – 29 June 1863) was a Romanian Greek Catholic hierarch. He was the first bishop of the new created Romanian Catholic Eparchy of Gherla, Armenopoli, Szamos-Ujvár from 1854 to 1863.

== Biography ==
Born in Mălădia, Sălaj, Austrian Empire (present day – Romania) in 1800, he was ordained a priest on 30 October 1825. He was confirmed the Bishop by the Holy See on 16 November 1854. He was consecrated to the Episcopate on 28 October 1855. The principal consecrator was Archbishop Alexandru Sterca-Șuluțiu, the co-consecrators were Bishop Vasile Erdeli and Bishop Angelo Parsi.

He died in Gherla, Romania on 29 June 1863.

== See also ==
- Catholic Church in Romania

Catholic Church titles
New title	Romanian Catholic Eparchy of Gherla, Armenopoli, Szamos-Ujvár; 1854–1863	Succeeded by Ioan Vancea
