= Moise Dragoș =

Romanian Greek Catholic hierarch

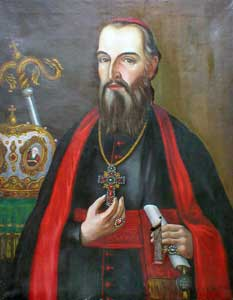
Bishop Moise Dragoș

Moise Dragoș (1 September 1726 – 16 April 1787) was a Romanian Greek Catholic hierarch. He was the first bishop of the new created Romanian Catholic Eparchy of Oradea Mare from 1777 to 1787.

Born in Turda, Habsburg monarchy (present day – Romania) in 1726, he was ordained a priest on 26 April 1751 and served as parish priest and dean of the Greek-Catholic parish in Oradea. He was confirmed the Bishop by the Holy See on 23 June 1777. He was consecrated to the Episcopate on 9 November 1777. The principal consecrator was Bishop Grigore Maior.

He died in Oradea (present day – Romania) on 17 April 1787.

Catholic Church titles
New title	Romanian Catholic Eparchy of Oradea Mare; 1777–1787	Succeeded by Ignațiu Darabant
