= Victor Mihaly de Apșa =

Ethnic Romanian Austro-Hungarian bishop

- Archeparch of Făgăraș and Alba Iulia
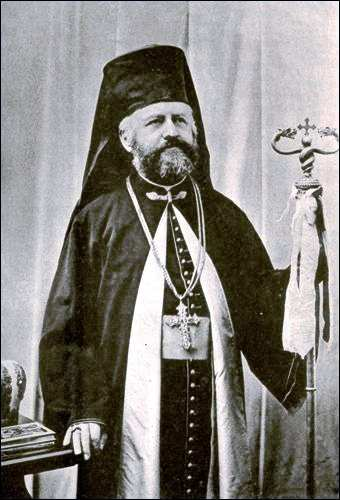
- Church: Romanian Greek Catholic Church
- Archdiocese: Major Archeparchy of Făgăraș and Alba Iulia
- In office: 18 March 1895 – 21 January 1918
- Predecessor: Ioan Vancea
- Successor: Vasile Suciu
- Previous post: Eparch of Lugoj (1874-1895)

Orders
- Ordination: 8 November 1863
- Consecration: 14 February 1875 by Ioan Vancea

Personal details
- Born: 19 May 1841 Jód, Máramaros County, Kingdom of Hungary, Austrian Empire
- Died: 21 January 1918 (aged 76)

Victor Mihaly de Apşa, commonly Victor Mihali (19 May 1841 – 21 January 1918), was an ethnic Romanian Austro-Hungarian bishop of the Greek-Catholic Church. Born to an old noble family in Ieud, Maramureș County, he attended a Piarist primary school in Sighetu Marmaţiei and high school in Oradea, Trnava and Košice. After graduating in 1857, he was sent to Rome by his father, encouraged by Bishop Ioan Alexi. He studied at the Congregation for the Evangelization of Peoples, obtaining a doctorate in theology in 1863 and being ordained priest later that year. He returned to Transylvania and in 1864 was first named dean of students and later professor of church history and canon law at the seminary in Gherla. After Gherla Bishop Ioan Vancea was elected Metropolitan of Făgăraş and Alba Iulia, he took Mihali with him to Blaj as his secretary. In 1869-1870, Mihali accompanied Vancea to the First Vatican Council.

In late 1874, Mihali was named Bishop of Lugoj, Ioan Olteanu having been transferred to Oradea. He was consecrated at Blaj the following February, and spent twenty years in Lugoj. He visited 110 parishes and held two diocesan synods (in 1882 and 1883). During his reign, many churches, schools and parish houses were built or renovated; other structures were bought and adapted for religious uses. In 1893 he led the first Romanian pilgrimage to Rome. Vancea died in 1892, and Mihali succeeded him three years later. As head of the church, he held a number of synods as well as a council in 1900 to mark the 200th anniversary of the union with Rome. He opposed Magyarization policies in education and the 1912 establishment of the Hajdúdorog Diocese. He led the December 1917 liturgy at which Iuliu Hossu was consecrated Bishop of Gherla and died the following month.

Mihali was made an honorary member of the Romanian Academy in 1894.
