= Ioan Sabo =

Romanian priest (1836–1911)

- Eparch of Gherla, Armenopoli, Szamos-Ujvár
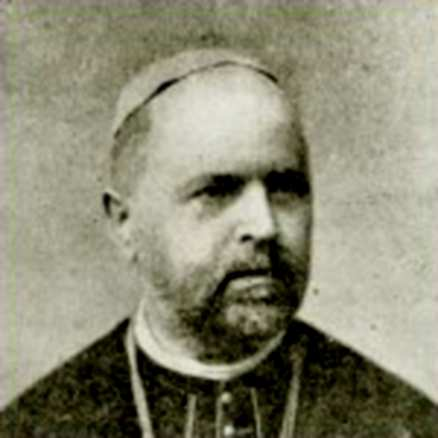
- Church: Romanian Greek Catholic Church
- Diocese: Eparchy of Gherla, Armenopoli, Szamos-Ujvár
- In office: 15 May 1879 – 2 May 1911
- Predecessor: Mihail Pavel
- Successor: Vasile Hossu

Orders
- Ordination: 4 September 1859
- Consecration: 3 August 1879 by Mihail Pavel

Personal details
- Born: 16 August 1836 Esztró (south of present-day Moftin), Szatmár County, Kingdom of Hungary, Austrian Empire
- Died: 2 May 1911 (aged 74) Szamosújvár, Szolnok-Doboka County, Transleithania, Austria-Hungary

Ioan Sabo (16 August 1836 – 2 May 1911) was a Romanian Greek Catholic hierarch. He was bishop of the Romanian Catholic Eparchy of Gherla, Armenopoli, Szamos-Ujvár from 1879 to 1911.

Born in Istrău, today in Romania (then Esztró, Kingdom of Hungary, Austrian Empire) in 1836, he was ordained a priest on 4 September 1859. He was confirmed the Bishop by the Holy See on 15 May 1879. He was consecrated to the Episcopate on 3 August 1879. The principal consecrator was Bishop Mihail Pavel.

He died in Gherla, today in Romania (then Szamosújvár, Austria-Hungary) on 2 May 1911.

Catholic Church titles
Preceded by Mihail Pavel	Romanian Catholic Eparchy of Gherla, Armenopoli, Szamos-Ujvár; 1879–1911	Succeeded by Vasile Hossu
