= Vasile Erdeli =

Hungarian priest

- Eparch of Oradea Mare
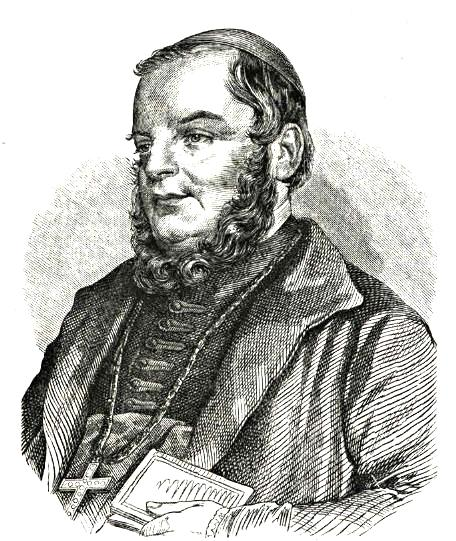
- Church: Romanian Greek Catholic Church
- Diocese: Eparchy of Oradea Mare
- In office: 30 January 1843 – 27 March 1862
- Predecessor: Samuil Vulcan
- Successor: Iosif Papp-Szilágyi

Orders
- Ordination: 12 November 1820
- Consecration: 11 June 1843 by Ioan Lemeni

Personal details
- Born: 1 August 1794 Makó, Csanád County, Kingdom of Hungary, Habsburg Empire
- Died: 17 March 1862 (aged 67) Oradea, Bihar County, Kingdom of Hungary, Austrian Empire

Vasile Erdeli (1 August 1794 – 17 March 1862), also known as the Vasile Erdeli-Ardeleanu, was a Romanian bishop of the Diocese of Oradea Mare, between 1843 and 1862.

== Origins and education ==
Vasile Erdeli was born in Macău, Csanád County, Kingdom of Hungary (today in Hungary), in a family of Romanian shepherds, leave the Budureasa.

His secondary education was in Timișoara and Oradea then, as a student of United Romanian Youth Seminar, which ended in 1815. During 1815–1816, he studied a year at the Academy of Rights in Oradea, then, between 1816 and 1817, the first year of theology, all the Latin Seminary in Oradea. Second year of theology made in Budapest, and, since autumn 1818, and continued his studies, during the third and fourth, in Vienna, which ended in 1820. From Vienna he returned home.

== Priest ==
On 20 November 1820, Basil Erdeli-Ardeleanu was ordained celibate priest and, from 1821 to 1829, he served as parish administrator, and then the priest Beius. He moved, in 1829, to Olosig, Oradea, where he was appointed priest. On 9 June 1835, Basil received Ardeleanu Erdeli-canonical function Capitlulul Oradea Cathedral, and then became rector of the Greek Catholic Seminary in Oradea (1836–1848). Further, Basil Erdeli-canonical step up Ardeleanu custodian, as well as the assessor of the plate and Csongrád-Csanád judicial districts.

== Bishop ==
On 2 August 1843, Basil was appointed Erdeli-Ardeleanu and then consecrated bishop of Oradea, the Romanian Church United with Rome by Bishop Ioan Lemeni in Blaj. Even before being ordained a bishop since 1832, until 1848, Basil Erdeli-Ardeleanu made many vizitaţii canonical in Banat and managed to increase the number of parishes from 2–22. Carei, Satu Mare, set up a curacy. The diocese he ruled, he built fifty churches and repaired.

He recommended the priests and faithful to subscribe to "Gazeta de Transilvania" which appear in Brașov. He introduced Romanian as teaching language, from 4 March 1849, instead of Latin in secondary school for boys in Beius, high school rank of 8 classes. Canon Joseph appointed diocesan inspector Salajan Pop. A normal high school in Oradea and from Beiuș to 4 classes. Basil Erdeli-Ardeleanu as Emanoil Gojdu during revolutions of 1848–1849 in Transylvania and Hungary, the Romanian-Hungarian brotherhood promoted, but soon after the capitulation of Șiria, Arad kossuthişti Hungarian revolutionaries, supported in publicly, Franz Joseph I, Emperor of the Habsburg Empire. In the midst of fighting between troops of the Tsarist intervention Hungarian revolutionaries led by Lajos Kossuth, the host, the warm, the Tsarist General Ivan Paskevich, the Beiuș. In 1849 he was presented the king, who decorated it and made baron, as Andrei Şaguna, in fact, for the same reasons. In January 1850, a petition to the king, asked him to turn the Principality of Transylvania in "Romanian Land" and Emperor to receive the title of "Great in the novel".

Vasile Ardeleanu Erdeli-managed, with the support of Governor of Hungary, Archduke Albrecht, the establishment of a Chair of Romanian Language and Literature at the University of Budapest, academic year 1862 to 1863. This chair was named Professor Alexander Roman (1826–1897), founding member of the Romanian Academy in Bucharest and publicist, who had taught the Romanian language since 1850, the School Premonstrantes of Oradea.

During his pastoral, the Greek-Catholic Diocese of Oradea passed from the jurisdiction of Archdiocese of Esztergom into the jurisdiction of the Archdiocese of Făgăraş and Alba Iulia.

== Death ==
Bishop Basil Erdeli-Ardeleanu died at the age of 68, in Oradea, on 17 March 1862. He was buried in St. Nicholas in Oradea.

== Bibliographic sources ==
John M. Bota, Universal Church History of the Romanian Church from its origins until today, publisher Christian Life, Cluj-Napoca, 1994 (pp. 216, 287).
