= Grigore Maior =

- Primate of the Romanian Greek Catholic Church
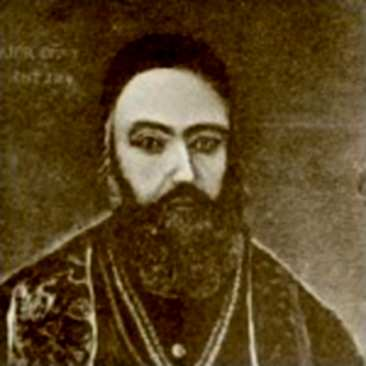
- Church: Romanian Greek Catholic Church
- Diocese: Diocese of Făgăraş
- Appointed: 8 March 1773
- Term ended: 13 March 1782
- Predecessor: Atanasie Rednic
- Successor: Ioan Bob

Orders
- Ordination: 25 Dec 1745 (Priest)
- Consecration: 23 April 1773 (Bishop) by Vasilije Božičković

Personal details
- Born: Gavrila Maior; 1715 Sărăuad, Szatmár County
- Died: 7 February 1785 (aged 69–70) Alba Iulia

Grigore Gavrila Maior, O.S.B.M., (1715 – 7 February 1785) was Bishop of Făgăraş and Primate of the Romanian Greek Catholic Church from 1773 to his resignation in 1782.

== Life ==
Gavrilă Maior was born in 1715, in Sărăuad, Szatmár County (Transylvania). He studied at Cluj and later from 1740 in the College of the Propaganda, Rome, where he on 28 January 1747 got a doctorate in theology and philosophy. He entered the Basilian monastery of the Holy Trinity in Blaj taking the name of Grigore, and on 25 December 1745 he was ordained a priest. He taught languages (Latin and Hungarian) in Blaj.

On 30 June 1764, following the death of the Primate of the Romanian Greek Catholic Church, the bishop of Făgăraş Petru Pavel Aron, the electoral synod convened and Maior was chosen. Nevertheless the Habsburg monarch, Empress Maria Theresa, designated Atanasie Rednic as new bishop. Maior, unhappy he was not appointed bishop, murmured against the appointment of Rednic. For this reason András Hadik, the commander of the Habsburg army in Transylvania, imprisoned Maior in Sibiu for three and a half months, and later confined him in the monastery of Mukachevo. In 1771 Maior pleaded with Emperor Joseph II, who was visiting the monastery, and succeeded in being released; he began work as censor of books in Vienna.

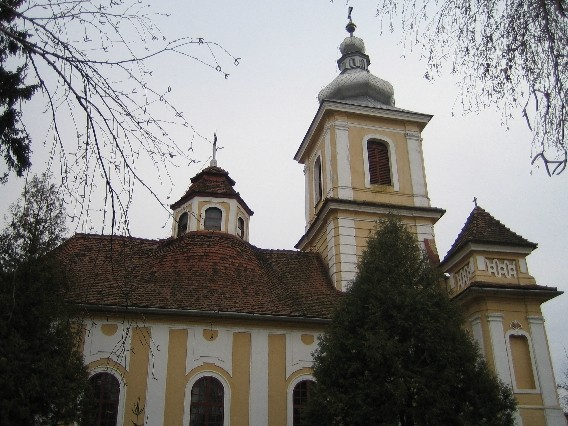
Church of St. Peter and Paul in Sibiu founded by Grigore Maior

At the death of Rednic, the electoral synod, on 15 August 1772, again voted for Maior, who this time was designated by the Empress on 27 October 1772 and appointed by Pope Clement XIV on 8 March 1773. His consecration as bishop took place on 23 April 1773 in a chapel of the imperial palace in Vienna, by the hands of the Croat Vasilije Božičković. Empress Maria Theresa was present at the ceremony and was very impressed by the beautiful rituals of the Byzantine rite and by Major's speech, to whom the Empress bestowed a golden cross and a valuable ring.

As Primate of the Romanian Greek Catholic Church he sent many students to study in universities abroad and he worked hard for the expansion of the Church, obtaining in the first two years the joining of a considerable number of new villages. These efforts created resentment from Protestants and Orthodox who complained at the imperial court. He also sided for the social claims of the Revolt of Horea, Cloşca and Crişan. For these reasons he was forced to resign, as he did on 13 March 1782.

He died in a monastery in Alba Iulia on 7 February 1785.
