= George Guțiu =

Romanian Greek-Catholic bishop

- (Arch)Eparch of Cluj-Gherla
- Church: Romanian Greek Catholic Church
- Archdiocese: Eparchy of Cluj-Gherla
- In office: 14 March 1990 – 18 July 2002
- Predecessor: Iuliu Hossu
- Successor: Florentin Crihălmeanu

Orders
- Ordination: 8 December 1948 by Alexandru Cisar
- Consecration: 17 June 1990 by Alexandru Todea

Personal details
- Born: 30 March 1924 Vaideiu, Ogra, Mureș County, Kingdom of Romania
- Died: 8 May 2011 (aged 87)

George Guțiu (30 March 1924 – 8 May 2011) was a bishop of the Romanian Greek-Catholic Church.

Ordained to the priesthood in 1948, Guțiu was appointed bishop of the Greek Catholic Diocese of Cluj-Gherla, Romania and retired in 2002.
