= Tarcea =

Tarcea Értarcsa
- Commune
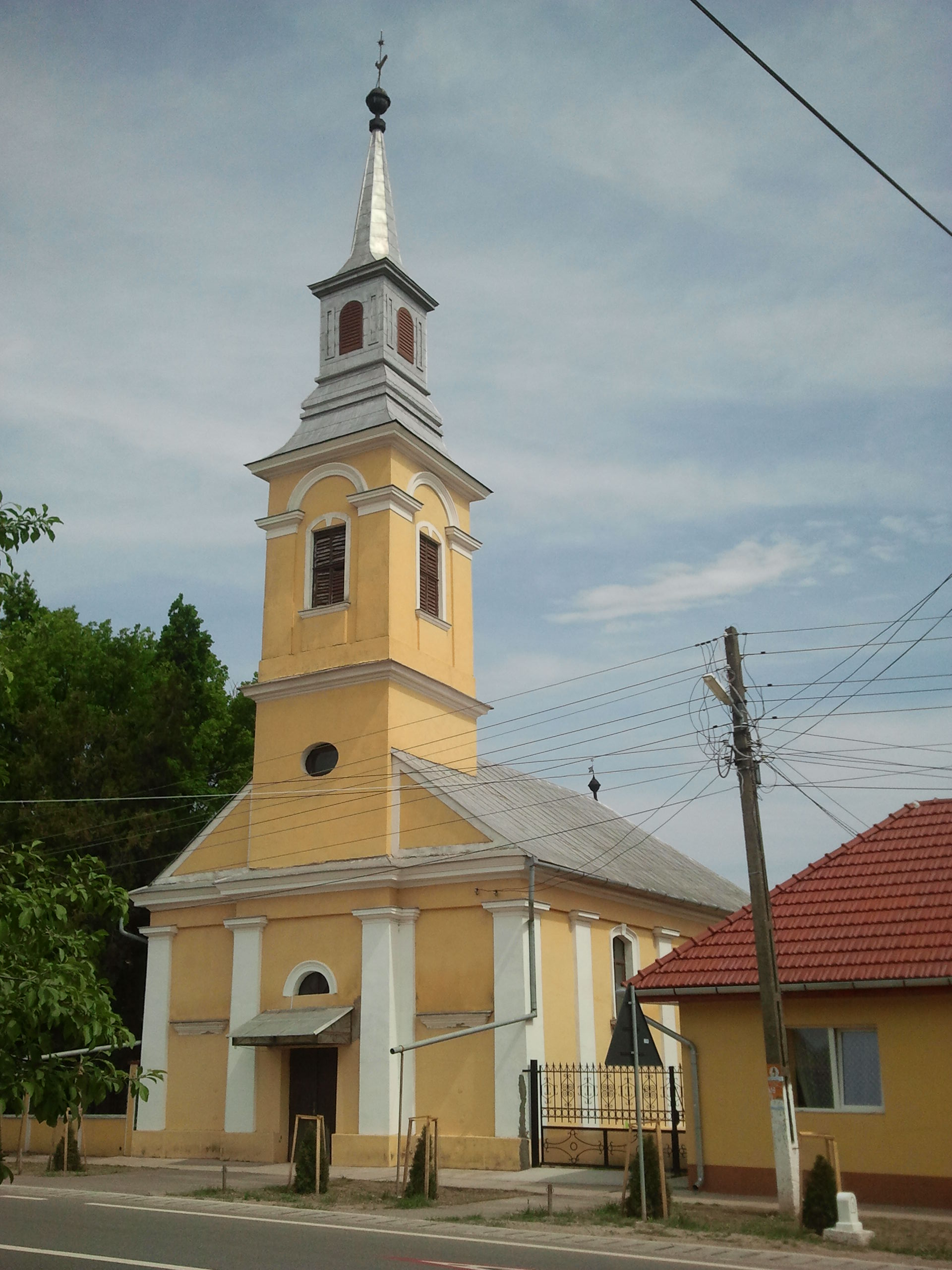
- Reformed Church

- Coat of arms

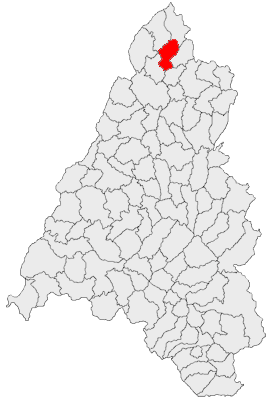
- Location in Bihor County

- Location in Romania
- Coordinates: 47°27′N 22°11′E
- Country: Romania
- County: Bihor
- Population (2021-12-01): 2,510
- Time zone: UTC+02:00 (EET)
  - Summer (DST): UTC+03:00 (EEST)
- Vehicle reg.: BH

Tarcea (Hungarian: Értarcsa) is a commune located in Bihor County, Crișana, Romania. It is composed of three villages: Adoni (Éradony), Galoșpetreu (Gálospetri), and Tarcea.

At the 2011 census, the commune had 2,690 inhabitants, of whom 77% were Hungarians, 16.8% Romanians, and 6.1% Roma. 51.7% were Reformed, 20% Roman Catholic, 12.6% Romanian Orthodox, 9.2% Greek-Catholic, and 5.2% Baptist.

== Natives ==
- Iosif Papp-Szilágyi (1813–1873), cleric of the Romanian Greek-Catholic Church and Bishop of the Diocese of Oradea Mare
