= Örményes =

Örményes may refer to:

- Örményes, Hungary, village in Jász-Nagykun-Szolnok County, Hungary
- Armeniș, municipality in Caraș-Severin County, Romania
- Urmeniș (Hungarian: Mezőörményes or Örményes), a commune in Bistrița-Năsăud County, Transylvania, Romania

== See also ==
- Băița de sub Codru
