= Ioan Giurgiu Patachi =

Early 18th-century Romanian Eastern Catholic bishop

- Primate of the Romanian Greek Catholic Church
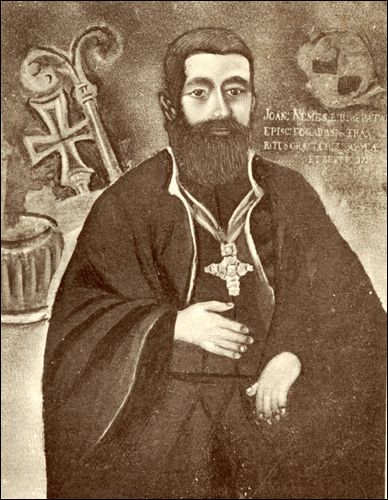
- Church: Romanian Greek Catholic Church
- Diocese: Diocese of Făgăraș
- Appointed: 3 February 1721
- Installed: 17 August 1723
- Term ended: 29 October 1727
- Predecessor: Atanasie Anghel
- Successor: Inocențiu Micu-Klein

Personal details
- Born: 1680 Kohóvölgy, Máramaros County
- Died: 19 October 1727 (aged 46–47) Voila, Brassó County

Ioan Giurgiu Patachi (or Latin: Ioannes Nemes de Pataki, 1680–1727) was Bishop of Fogaras and Primate of the Romanian Greek Catholic Church from 1721 to his death in 1727.

== Life ==
Ioan Giurgiu Patachi was born from a family of small nobility in Horgospataka (today Strâmbu, part of Chiuiești, Romania), Kolozs County in 1680. An orphan, he was raised by his uncle who left him in the Jesuits' care. He studied in Kolozsvár (today Cluj-Napoca, Romania), Vienna and later he was sent to the German and Hungarian College of Rome where he remained from 1705 to 1710. In Rome, on 24 September 1707, he was ordained a Roman Rite priest. After graduation, he served as Latin priest in Fogaras (today Făgăraș, Romania).

The first Greek Catholic Bishop of the territory of present-day Romania, the bishop of Gyulafehérvár (today Alba Iulia, Romania), Atanasie Anghel, died on 19 August 1713, and his succession was problematic. At first the Synod of the Church elected a Jesuit, Ferenc Szunyogh, who refused. Later the Synod elected the former secretary of Atanasie, Venceslav Franz, but this selection was opposed by the Habsburg monarch, the Emperor Charles VI, because Franz was a layman. Finally on 23 December 1715 a consensus was reached on the name of Patachi.

The way to his formal enthronement was still long. On 14 February 1717 he entered in the Basilian Order, and he had to petition the Vatican for the change of liturgical rite to the Byzantine Rite. Moreover the Latin bishop of Gyulafehérvár opposed to presence of a Greek Catholic diocese in the same town, and the monastery in Gyulafehérvár, where the Greek Catholic Romanian Church was based, had to be demolished to give place to a fortress. Actually it was only on 3 February 1721 that Patachi was formally confirmed by Pope Clement XI and on 18 May 1721 the See was moved to Fogaras, thus founding the Greek Catholic Diocese of Fogaras. His enthronement occurred in the Cathedral of St. Nicholas in Fogaras on 17 August 1723.

He died a few years later, on 29 October 1727 in Alsószombatfalva, Brassó County (today Sâmbăta de Jos, part of Voila, Romania).
