= Romanian Catholic Eparchy of Cluj-Gherla =

Eastern Catholic eparchy in Romania

Eparchy of Cluj-Gherla Eparchia Claudiopolitano-Armenopolitana; Szamo-Uiavariensis Romenorum Eparhia de Cluj-Gherla

Location
- Country: Romania
- Ecclesiastical province: Făgăraş and Alba Iulia
- Metropolitan: Major Archeparchy of Făgăraş and Alba Iulia
- Population: (as of 2013); 49,500

Information
- Denomination: Catholic Church
- Sui iuris church: Romanian Greek Catholic Church
- Rite: Byzantine
- Established: 19 December 1853 (As Diocese of Gherla, Armenopoli, Szamos-Ujvár ) 5 June 1930 (As Diocese of Cluj-Gherla)
- Cathedral: Transfiguration Cathedral, Cluj-Napoca

Current leadership
- Pope: Leo XIV
- Major Archbishop: Claudiu-Lucian Pop
- Bishop: Claudiu-Lucian Pop

Map
- Church administrative divisions

The Eparchy of Cluj-Gherla is an eparchy (equivalent to a diocese in the Latin Church) of the Romanian Greek Catholic Church which is an Eastern Catholic particular church of the Catholic Church that is in full communion with the Holy See. Its uses the Byzantine Rite in the Romanian language in its liturgical services. It was founded in 1930. It is a suffragan diocese of the Major Archeparchy of Făgăraș and Alba Iulia. The eparchy's cathedral church is the Cathedral of the Transfiguration which is situated in the city of Cluj-Napoca, Romania. A co-cathedral — the Cathedral of the Entry of the Virgin Mary into the Temple in Gherla — is still in the hands of the Romanian Orthodox Church. The incumbent eparch is Claudiu-Lucian Pop.

== Eparchs ==
- Ioan Alexi (16 Nov 1854 Confirmed – 29 Jun 1863 Died)
- Ioan Vancea (25 Sep 1865 Appointed – 21 Dec 1868 Appointed, Archbishop of Fagaras e Alba Iulia (Romanian))
- Mihail Pavel (23 Dec 1872 Appointed – 15 May 1879 Appointed, Bishop of Oradea Mare {Gran Varadino} (Romanian)
- Ioan Sabo (15 May 1879 Appointed – May 1911 Died)
- Vasile Hossu (16 Dec 1911 Appointed – 13 Jan 1916 Died)
- Iuliu Hossu (21 Apr 1917 Appointed – 28 May 1970 Died) (Cardinal in pectore, 1969)
- George Guțiu (14 Mar 1990 Appointed – 18 Jul 2002 Retired)
- Florentin Crihălmeanu (18 Jul 2002 Succeeded – 12 Jan 2021 Died)
- Claudiu-Lucian Pop (14 Apr 2021 – 5 Nov 2025, Elected Major Archbishop)
- Claudiu-Lucian Pop (again since 15 Oct 2026, united in persona Episcopi)
