= Vasile Hossu (bishop of Oradea) =

Romanian Greek Catholic hierarch

- Eparch of Oradea Mare
- Church: Romanian Greek Catholic Church
- Diocese: Eparchy of Oradea Mare
- In office: 14 March 1990 – 8 June 1997
- Predecessor: Valeriu Traian Frențiu
- Successor: Virgil Bercea

Orders
- Ordination: 4 February 1945 by Ioan Suciu
- Consecration: 27 May 1990 by Alexandru Todea

Personal details
- Born: 17 May 1919 Carei, occupied Szatmár County, Kingdom of Romania
- Died: 8 June 1997 (aged 78) Oradea, Bihor County, Romania

Vasile Hossu (17 May 1919 – 8 June 1997) was a Romanian Greek Catholic hierarch. He was bishop of the Romanian Catholic Eparchy of Oradea Mare from 1990 to 1997.

== Biography ==
Born in Nagykároly, Hungary (today Carei, Romania) in 1919, he was ordained a priest on 4 February 1945 by Bishop Ioan Suciu. He was arrested and detained several times by the Communist regime in Romania during the persecution and abolition of the Greek-Catholics.

He was appointed the Bishop by the Holy See on 14 March 1990. He was consecrated to the Episcopate on 27 May 1990. The principal consecrator was Archbishop Alexandru Todea and co-consecrators were Archbishop Guido Del Mestri and Bishop Ioan Ploscaru.

He died in Oradea on 8 June 1997.

== See also ==
- Catholic Church in Romania

Catholic Church titles
| Preceded by Iuliu Hirțea | Romanian Catholic Eparchy of Oradea Mare; 1990–1997 | Succeeded by Virgil Bercea |
