= Florentin Crihălmeanu =

Romanian Greek-Catholic bishop (1959–2021)

The Right Reverend Florentin Crihalmeanu
- Greek Catholic Bishop of Cluj-Gherla
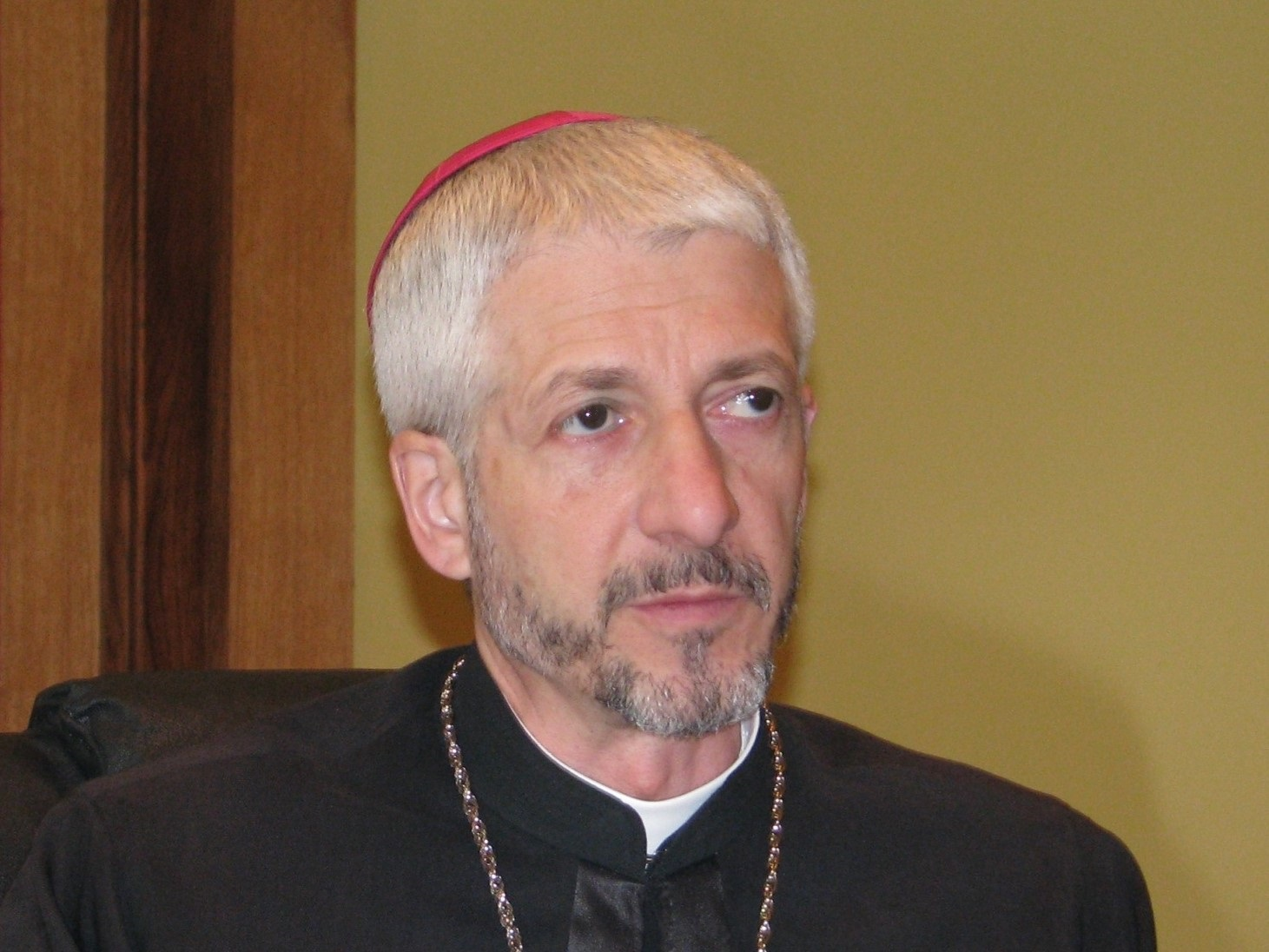
- Church: Romanian Greek Catholic Church
- Diocese: Greek Catholic Diocese of Cluj-Gherla
- Appointed: 18 July 2002
- Term ended: 12 January 2021
- Predecessor: George Guţiu
- Successor: Claudiu-Lucian Pop
- Other post: Auxiliary Bishop of Cluj-Gherla

Orders
- Ordination: 9 September 1990
- Consecration: 6 January 1997 by Pope John Paul II

Personal details
- Born: 17 September 1959 Iași, Romania
- Died: 12 January 2021 (aged 61) Cluj-Napoca, Romania

Florentin Crihălmeanu (17 September 1959 – 12 January 2021) was a Romanian Greek Catholic hierarch.

== Life ==
Born in Iași to a Greek-Catholic father and a Roman Catholic mother, he graduated from high school in Cluj-Napoca in 1978. He enlisted in military service in Turda in 1978–79. After finishing military service, in 1984, he graduated from the Technical University of Cluj-Napoca, working as an engineer until 1990 first in Bistrița and then in Cluj-Napoca. He began private theological lessons in 1986 and was ordained priest in September 1990, following the collapse of the communist regime and legalization of the church. Sent to Rome to deepen his studies, he graduated twice in Theology in 1992 and 1994 from the Pontifical Urbaniana University. Upon returning to Romania, he taught courses at the seminary in Cluj-Napoca and at Babeș-Bolyai University. He was named auxiliary bishop of the Cluj-Gherla Diocese in November 1996, with his consecration taking place the following January, performed by Pope John Paul II in St. Peter's Basilica. In 2002, he became Bishop of Cluj-Gherla, succeeding George Guțiu.

Crihălmeanu died of COVID-19 in January 2021, at the age of 61, amid the COVID-19 pandemic in Romania.
