= Curtuișeni =

Curtuișeni Érkörtvélyes
- Commune
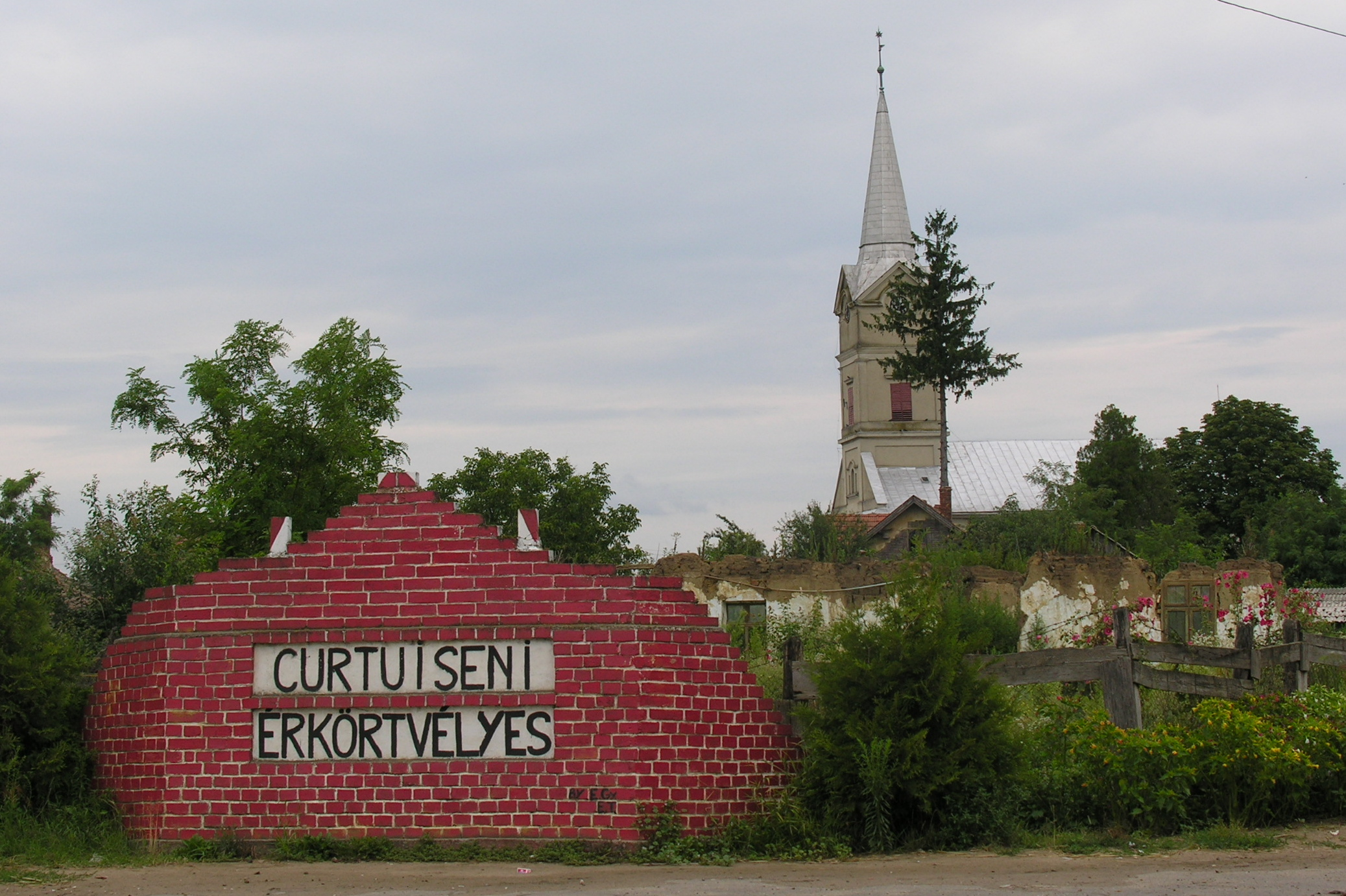
- Entrance into Curtuișeni

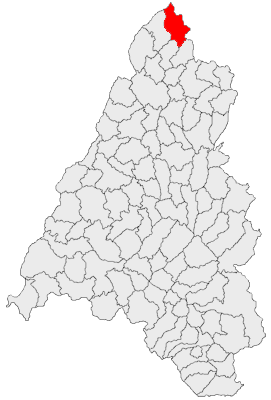
- Location in Bihor County

- Location in Romania
- Coordinates: 47°33′N 22°12′E
- Country: Romania
- County: Bihor

Government
  - Mayor (2020–2024): István Nagy (UDMR)
- Area: 69.37 km^{2} (26.78 sq mi)
- Population (2021-12-01): 3,657
  - Density: 52.72/km^{2} (136.5/sq mi)
- Time zone: UTC+02:00 (EET)
  - Summer (DST): UTC+03:00 (EEST)
- Postal code: 417225
- Area code: +40 x59
- Vehicle reg.: BH
- Website: curtuiseni.ro

Curtuișeni (Hungarian: Érkörtvélyes) is a commune in Bihor County, Crișana, Romania with a population of 3,780 people. It is composed of two villages, Curtuișeni and Vășad (Érvasad).

At the 2011 census, 63.3% of inhabitants were Hungarians, 22.5% Romanians, and 14.1% Roma.

== Natives ==
- Ioan Vancea (1820–1892), Austro-Hungarian ethnic Romanian bishop of the Greek-Catholic Church
