= Ioan Olteanu =

Romanian Greek Catholic hierarch

- Eparch of Oradea Mare
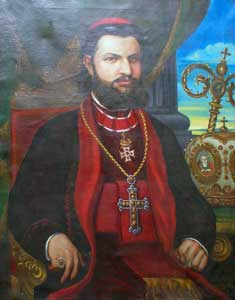
- Church: Romanian Greek Catholic Church
- Diocese: Eparchy of Oradea Mare
- In office: 22 December 1873 – 29 November 1877
- Predecessor: Iosif Papp-Szilágyi
- Successor: Mihail Pavel
- Previous post: Eparch of Lugoj (1870-1873)

Orders
- Ordination: 5 April 1863
- Consecration: 18 December 1870 by Iosif Papp-Szilágyi

Personal details
- Born: 14 December 1839 Bégaszentes (east of present-day Făget), Krassó County, Kingdom of Hungary, Austrian Empire
- Died: 29 November 1877 (aged 37) Belényes, Bihar County, Transleithania, Austria-Hungary

Ioan Olteanu (14 December 1839 – 29 November 1877) was a Romanian Greek Catholic hierarch. He was bishop of the Romanian Catholic Eparchy of Lugoj from 1870 to 1873 and the Romanian Catholic Eparchy of Oradea Mare from 1873 to 1877.

Born in Sintești, Timiș, Banat, Austrian Empire (present day – Romania) in 1839, he was ordained a priest on 5 April 1863. He was confirmed the Bishop by the Holy See on 29 November 1870. He was consecrated to the Episcopate on 18 December 1870. The principal consecrator was Bishop Iosif Papp-Szilágyi.

He died in Beiuș (present day – Romania) on 29 November 1877.

Catholic Church titles
Preceded by Alexandru Dobra	Romanian Catholic Eparchy of Lugoj; 1870–1873	Succeeded by Victor Mihaly de Apșa
Preceded by Iosif Papp-Szilágyi	Romanian Catholic Eparchy of Oradea Mare; 1873–1877	Succeeded by Mihail Pavel
