= Inocențiu Micu-Klein =

Romanian Greek Catholic bishop and primate

Ioan Inocențiu Micu-Klein
- Primate of the Romanian Greek Catholic Church
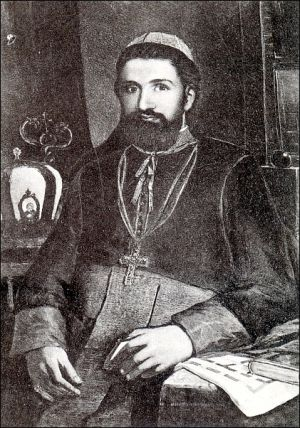
- Church: Romanian Greek Catholic Church
- Diocese: Diocese of Făgăraș
- Appointed: 12 September 1730
- Installed: 28 September 1732
- Term ended: 7 May 1751
- Predecessor: Ioan Giurgiu Patachi
- Successor: Petru Pavel Aron

Orders
- Ordination: 23 Sept 1729 (Priest)
- Consecration: 5 Nov 1730 (Bishop) by Gennadius Bizanczy

Personal details
- Born: Ioan Micu; 1692 Cók, Principality of Transylvania (now Sadu, Romania)
- Died: 22 September 1768 (aged 75–76) Rome, Papal States

Ioan Inocențiu Micu-Klein, also known by his lay name Ioan Micu (1692 – 22 September 1768), was a Bishop of Fogaras and Primate of the Romanian Greek Catholic Church from 1730 to his resignation in 1751. He played an instrumental role in the establishment of national rights for Romanians in Transylvania (part of the Habsburg monarchy at the time of his life).

== Life ==
He was born as Ioan Micu (Inocențiu being his clergy name, and Klein the German translation of his surname, sometimes rendered back into Romanian transcription as Clain) in Cók, Principality of Transylvania (now Sadu, Romania), in 1692 from a lower-class family. He studied by the Jesuits in Kolozsvár (now Cluj-Napoca, Romania) and – moving from Transylvania to the upper part of the Kingdom of Hungary – trained in theology in Nagyszombat (now Trnava, Slovakia).

On 18 November 1728, following the death of previous bishop Ioan Giurgiu Patachi, the electoral synod convened and Micu resulted the more voted, even if he was young and he had not yet terminated his studies. Accordingly, on 12 July 1729 the Habsburg monarch, Emperor Charles VI, designated him as new bishop of Fogaras (now Făgăraș, Romania). On 5 September 1729 he was awarded the title of Baron, and on 23 September of that year, Micu became a priest and immediately he joined the Basilian Order. Pope Clement XII confirmed him on 11 September 1730, and accordingly he was consecrated a bishop on 5 November 1730 by Gennadius Bizanczy, the Eparch of Munkács. From Munkács (now Mukachevo, Ukraine) he moved to Vienna, where he pleaded the Emperor for the rights of Transylvanian people. He made his formal enthronement in Fogaras on 28 September 1732, and, following his insistence, on 11 December 1732 he was given a seat in the Transylvanian Diet.

Immediately after his enthronement, he summoned an ecclesiastic synod which issued 20 decrees on administrative, disciplinary, sacramentary issues. In 1737, he moved the bishopric seat from Fogaras to Balázsfalva (now Blaj, Romania), and laid the foundations to the local cathedral in 1741.

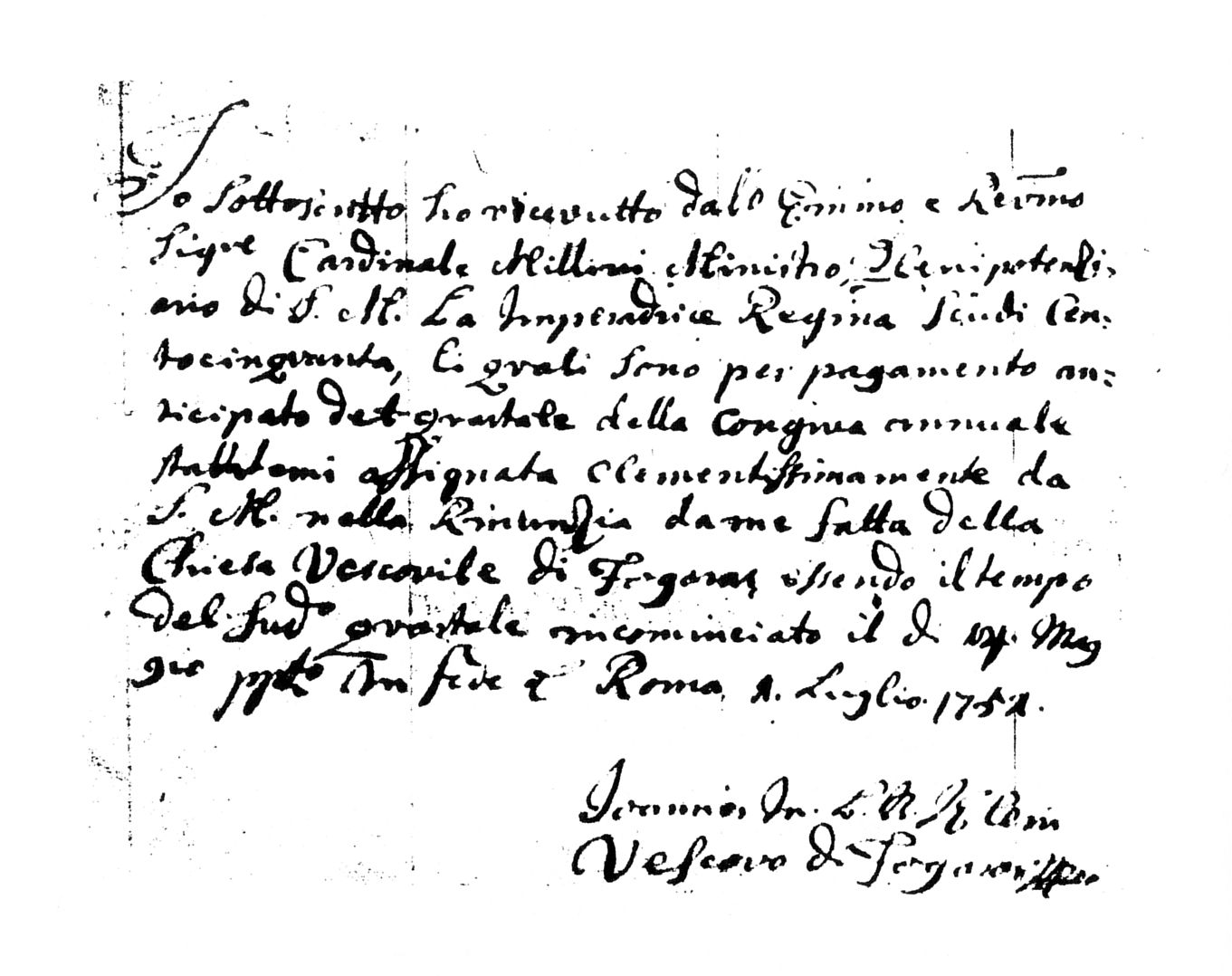
Letter with signature: Joannes In[nocentius] L[iber] B[aron] Klein Vescovo di Fogarasi

As a member of the Diet (Parliament) of Transylvania, Inocențiu Micu began to press the Habsburg monarchy to fulfill the Agreement that conversion to Greek Catholicism would bring with it Roman Catholic-like privileges for Romanian inhabitants also, and an end to serfdom.

First pressing for rights for clergy and converts, he soon began to petition for freedom for all Romanians. Micu petitioned the Habsburg court for over forty years to this end. His perseverance ultimately made both the Austrian Empress Maria Theresia and Transylvania's Diet declare themselves offended - the Hungarian majority in the Diet opposed the liberation of the work force or the awarding of political rights to Romanians (Vlachs), considered by the Diet as "moth for the cloth".

Exiled in 1744, Micu moved to Rome and he had to resign a few years later, on 7 May 1751. He died in Rome 17 years later, on 22 September 1768.
