= Ormeniș River =

Ormeniș River may refer to:

- Ormeniș, a tributary to Mureș in Romania
- Ormeniș, a tributary to Olt in Romania
