= Atanasie Rednic =

Former Roman Catholic Church bishop (1722–1772)

- Primate of the Romanian Greek Catholic Church
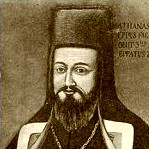
- Church: Romanian Greek Catholic Church
- Diocese: Diocese of Făgăraş
- Appointed: 15 May 1765
- Installed: 13 November 1765
- Term ended: 2 May 1772
- Predecessor: Petru Pavel Aron
- Successor: Grigore Maior

Orders
- Ordination: 1749 (Priest)
- Consecration: 4 August 1765 (Bishop) by M. Olsavszky

Personal details
- Born: February 1722 Giulești, Maramureș, Principality of Transylvania
- Died: 2 May 1772 (aged 50) Blaj, Principality of Transylvania

Atanasie Rednic (February 1722 – 2 May 1772) was Bishop of Făgăraş and Primate of the Romanian Greek Catholic Church from 1765 to his death in 1772.

== Early life and education ==
Atanasie Rednic was born in February 1722 in Giulești, Maramureș to an influential family. He studied by the Jesuits in Cluj and from 1743 in the Institute Pazmanian in Vienna, where he graduated in theology in 1747.

== Career ==
He moved to the monastery in Mukachevo of the Order of Saint Basil the Great and in 1749 he took the monastic vows and was ordained a priest. From 1751, he moved to Blaj, where he cooperated with bishop Petru Pavel Aron in spreading instruction: he founded schools and was appointed the rector of the seminary, and later he became the vicar of the bishop.

On 30 June 1764, after the death of the bishop of Făgăraş Petru Pavel Aron, the electoral synod convened, and Rednic ranked only fourth in the results. Nevertheless, and against the will of the monks, the Habsburg monarch, Empress Maria Theresa, designated him as the new bishop. Rednic accepted the government's requests for assistance to improve the conditions of the clergy. Pope Clement XIII confirmed the designation on 15 May 1765, and Rednic moved from Vienna to the Carpathian Ruthenia, where he was consecrated bishop on 4 August 1765 by M. Olsavszky, the Eparch of Mukachevo. He later arrived in Blaj, where he was enthroned on 13 November 1765 .

As bishop, he continued to request financial support from the government to improve the conditions of the parishes and schools, without achieving significant results. He also attempted to revitalize the monastic life in Blaj, introducing a strict discipline that he himself adhered to. He also continued to support instruction, enlisting the more cultured monks as teachers and providing aid grants for students to study abroad.

Rednic lived an ascetic life. He ate only vegetables and never wore silk clothing.

== Death ==
He died in Blaj on 2 May 1772.

== Known relatives ==
In the year 2025 the writer and internet personality Adrian Raul Rednic, known as Caleel, found out through the digital service MyHeritage to be a relative of the bishop and revealed it on his YouTube channel while advertising the digital service
