= Petru Pavel Aron =

- Primate of the Romanian Greek Catholic Church
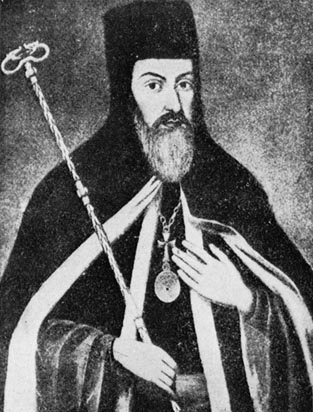
- Church: Romanian Greek Catholic Church
- Diocese: Făgăraş
- Appointed: 6 July 1752
- Term ended: 9 March 1764
- Predecessor: Inocenţiu Micu-Klein
- Successor: Atanasie Rednic

Orders
- Ordination: 4 August 1743 (Priest)
- Consecration: 1 September 1752 (Bishop) by M. Olsavszky

Personal details
- Born: 1709 Bistra, Principality of Transylvania
- Died: 9 March 1764 (aged 54–55) Baia Mare

Petru Pavel Aron (1709–1764) was Bishop of Făgăraş and Primate of the Romanian Greek Catholic Church from 1752 to his death in 1764. He also translated the Biblia Vulgata into Romanian (1760–1761).

== Life ==
Petru Pavel Aron was born Bistra in 1709. He studied by the Jesuits in Cluj and later in Trnava where he studied philosophy. He continued his studies of theology in the College of the Propaganda, Rome, where he remained till his doctorate in 1744. While in Rome, he took the monastic vows in the Basilian Order on 26 May 1742, and on 4 August 1743 he was ordained a priest.

Returned to Transylvania, he became the vicar of the bishop of Făgăraş Inocenţiu Micu-Klein. When in 1744 Micu-Klein, because of his petitions for freedom for all Romanians, was exiled in Rome, in a short time Aron remained as the reference figure in the Church. He actually was appointed Vicar general of the diocese of Fagaras on 31 August 1745.

On 4 November 1751, following the forced resignation of Micu-Klein, the electoral synod convened and Aron resulted the more voted. Accordingly, on 28 February 1752 the Habsburg monarch, Empress Maria Theresa, designated him as new bishop and Pope Benedict XIV confirmed the designation on 6 July 1752. He was consecrated bishop on 1 September 1752 by M. Olsavszky, the Eparch of Mukachevo, in the monastery of Máriapócs.

As bishop, he strongly supported instruction, opening the first primary school in Blaj, establishing over fifty parish schools, and founding the diocesan printing press in Blaj. The pastoral activities of Aron were hindered by the disturbance of the Orthodox monk Sofronie, which took the proportions of a violent riot supported by the Serbians.

He died in Baia Mare on 9 March 1764.

== Works ==
Petru Pavel Aron was a literate and a writer. His main works are:

- Our Holy Father John Damascene (in Latin: Sancti patris nostri Joannis Damasceni)
- Philosophic and Theological Works (in Latin: Opera Philosophica et Theologica)
- Comforting letter about the divine inspiration of the Scriptures (in Latin: Epistola consolatoria ex divinitus inspiratis Scripturis), Blaj, 1761;
- Principles and definitions of the Council of Florence (in Latin: Exordium et definitio sanctae œcumenicae synodi Florentinae exantiqua graecolatina editione desumpta), 1762;
- Principles of Christian doctrine (in Latin: Institutio docrinae christiane), 1764.

He also translated in Romanian the Bible from the Latin Vulgata version: Biblia Vulgata, Blaj, 1760-1761
