= Cathedral of the Entry of the Virgin Mary into the Temple, Gherla =

Cathedral of the Entry of the Virgin Mary into the Temple
- Catedrala Intrarea în Biserică a Maicii Domnului
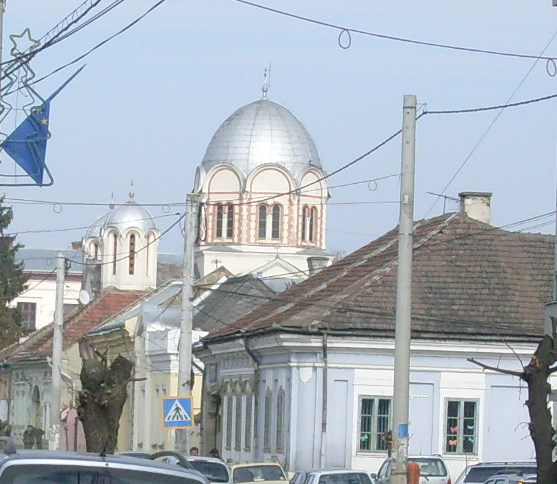
- Cathedral of the Entry of the Virgin Mary into the Temple
- 47°01′55″N 23°54′33″E
- Location: Stada Bobâlna 28, Gherla, Cluj County
- Country: Romania
- Denomination: Romanian Orthodox Church

The Cathedral of the Entry of the Virgin Mary into the Temple (Romanian: Catedrala Intrarea în Biserică a Maicii Domnului) is a Romanian Orthodox church located at Stada Bobâlna 28, Gherla, Romania.

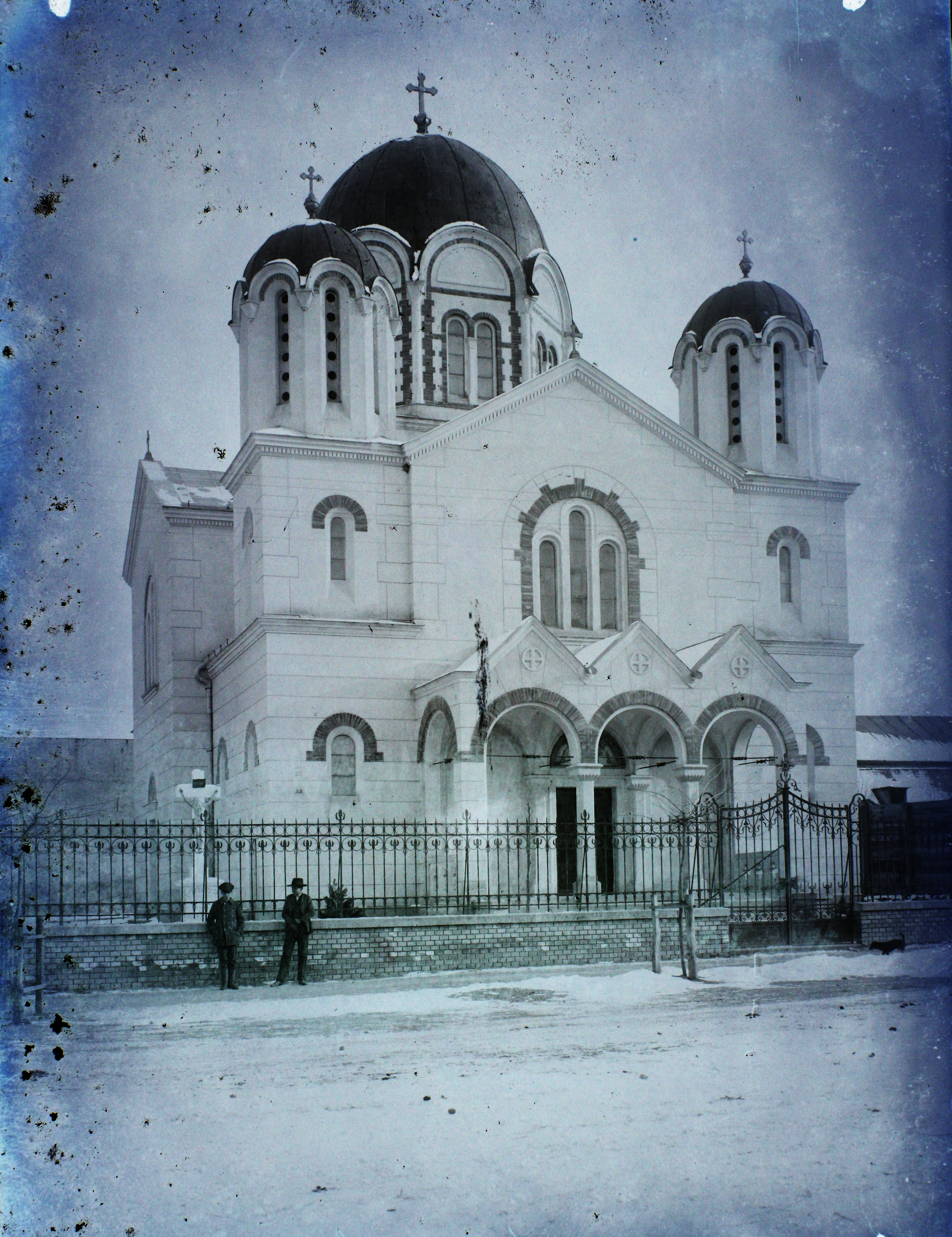
The cathedral in 1914

The construction of the cathedral was completed in 1906. The church was the cathedral of the Eparchy of Gherla until 1930, when the headquarters moved to Cluj, in the Minorites Church, and the Gherla cathedral became a co-cathedral. Since 1948, when the Romanian Greek Catholic Church was outlawed by the communist regime, the building has been used as a Romanian Orthodox parish.

In 2005, Patriarch Teoctist promised to return the church to its previous owner, but the transfer has yet to take place.

== See also ==
- Roman Catholicism in Romania
- List of cathedrals in Romania
