= Transfiguration Cathedral, Cluj-Napoca =

Cathedral in Cluj-Napoca, Romania

Coordinates: 46°46′10″N 23°35′34″E

Cluj-Napoca Greek-Catholic Cathedral Catedrala "Schimbarea la Faţă" din Cluj-Napoca
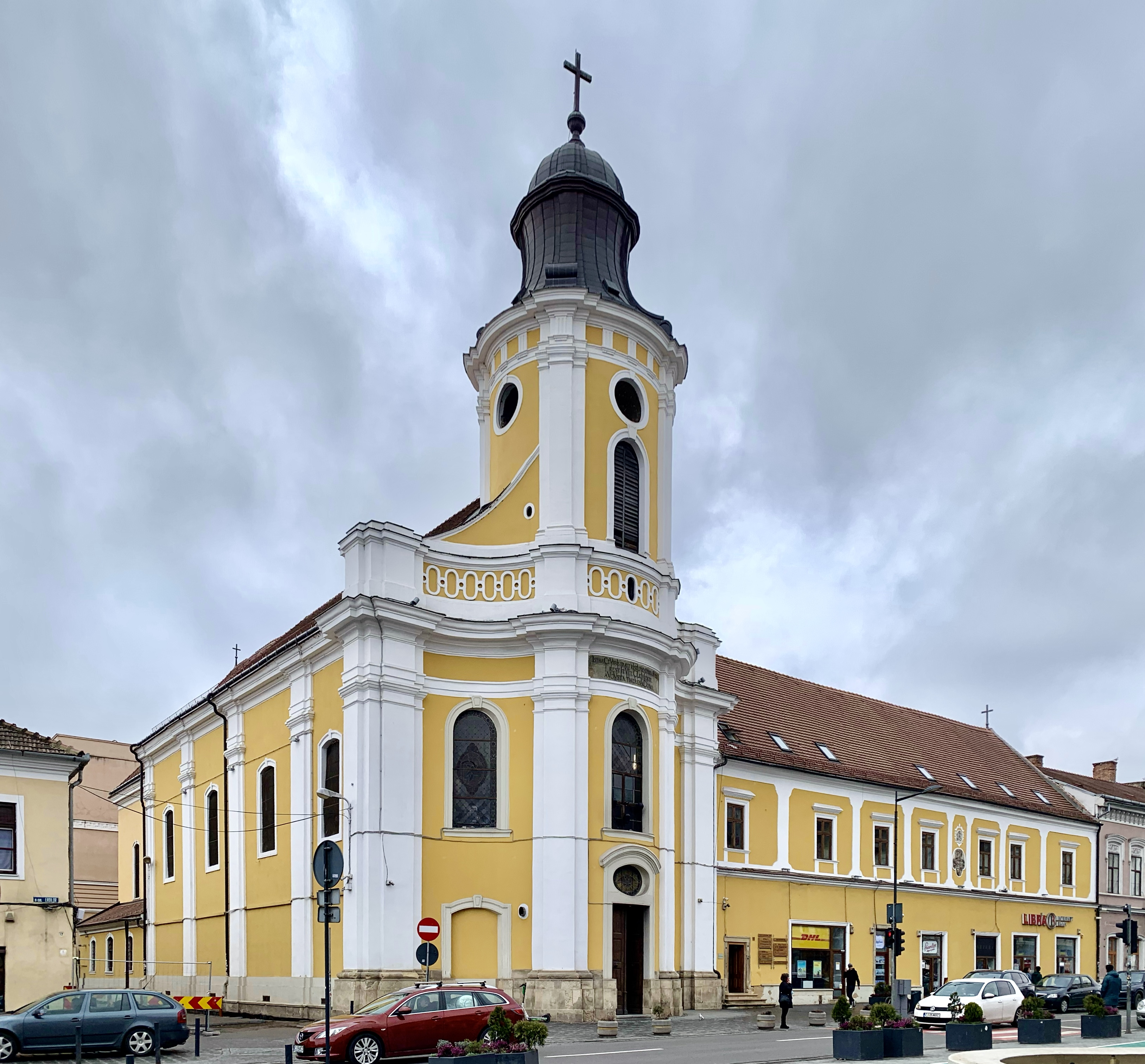
- Cluj-Napoca Greek-Catholic Cathedral

Religion
- Affiliation: Romanian Greek-Catholic
- District: Eparchy of Cluj-Gherla
- Ecclesiastical or organizational status: Cathedral
- Year consecrated: 1803

Location
- Location: Cluj-Napoca, Romania
- Interactive map of Cluj-Napoca Greek-Catholic Cathedral; Catedrala "Schimbarea la Faţă" din Cluj-Napoca

Architecture
- Architect: Francisc Kitner
- Style: Baroque
- Completed: 1779

Specifications
- Length: 43.7 m
- Width: 15.3 m
- Height (max): 28 m

The Transfiguration Cathedral (Romanian: Catedrala Schimbarea la Faţă), also known as the Minorites' Church (Romanian: Biserica Minoriţilor, Hungarian: Kolozsvári minorita templom), was donated in 1924 by the Holy See to the Romanian Greek-Catholic Church to serve as the Cathedral of the Cluj-Gherla Eparchy, after the move of the Eparchy's center from Gherla to Cluj.

== History ==
The first church of the Minorites in Cluj was the building known today as the Calvinist Church of Farkas street. After the Reformation, in 1556, the Friars Minor were expelled from the city. They were permitted to come back only in 1724 and could settle down only outside the city walls. Around 1765, the city council gave permission to the monks to settle down within the city walls. The church and the monastery were built in 1778-79, but the tower collapsed on 24 September 1779 due to mistakes made at the basement works. The re-building of the tower was financed by the empress Maria Theresa of Austria. The design was made by the architect of the Bánffy Palace, Johann Eberhard Blaumann. The tower and the roof of the church burnt down in 1798, and a temporary wooden roof was constructed. The new roof was built only in the 19th century. The murals of the ceiling were painted by Ferenc Lohr in 1908.

Several families offered Mass stipends to support the construction of the church. Many of them were later entombed in the church's crypt until 1834, when burials within the city walls were forbidden due to a cholera epidemic. Seven Baroque and Empire style honorary monuments, mostly of wealthy Armenian families, can be found in the church.

In 1924 Pope Pius XI gave the church building to the Greek-Catholic Church to serve as the cathedral of the Cluj-Gherla Eparchy. When the Greek-Catholic Church was dissolved in 1948 by the Communist regime, the church was taken over by the Romanian Orthodox Church. Initially, Orthodox Bishop Nicolae Colan and the assigned priest refused to enter the church, as a protest against the banning of the Greek Catholic Church. However, after the priest was persecuted and Colan harassed by the Communist authorities, they agreed to use it.

After the decline of Communism (1989), the Greek-Catholic Church asked for the restitution of the building, but they were refused. After a long litigation process, on 20 February 1998, the Court of Ploieşti decided in the favour of the Greek Catholic Church. On 20 March 1998 Orthodox priests held a procession in the centre of Cluj to protest again the restitution.

== Sources ==
- Dáné Tibor Kálmán et al. (red.) (2001). Kolozsvár 1000 éve (1000 years of Cluj) (in Hungarian). Cluj: Erdélyi Múzeum-Egyesület, Magyar Közművelődési Egyesület. ISBN 973-8231-14-0., referenced as Kolozsvár 1000
- Kelemen Lajos (1982). A volt minorita templom és síremlékei, in: Művészettörténeti tanulmányok II (in Hungarian). Bucuresti: Kriterion.
