= Iosif Papp-Szilágyi =

Austo-Hungarian Catholic bishop

The Right Reverend Iosif Papp-Szilágyi
- Greek-Catholic Diocese of Oradea Mare
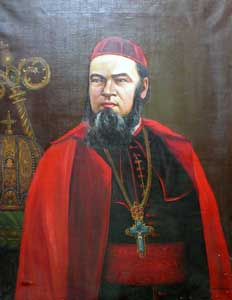
- Church: Romanian Greek-Catholic Church
- Installed: 1863
- Predecessor: Vasile Erdeli
- Successor: Ioan Olteanu

Orders
- Ordination: 27 August 1836

Personal details
- Born: April 13, 1813 Tarcea
- Died: 5 August 1873 (aged 60) Oradea

Iosif Papp-Szilágyi de Illyésfalva (Romanian: Iosif Pop Sliaghi de Illyésfalva; 13 April 1813–5 August 1873) was the Bishop of the Diocese of Oradea Mare of the Romanian Greek-Catholic Church from 1863 to 1872. He participated in the First Vatican Council.

He was born into the Szilágyi noble family.

== Decorations and awards ==
- Knight of the Order of Franz Joseph
