= Marius Bercea =

Romanian contemporary artist

- Born: 1979 (age 46–47); Cluj-Napoca, Romania
- Known for: Painting
- Movement: Contemporary art

Marius Bercea (born 1979) is a Romanian contemporary artist born and raised in Cluj, Romania, where he still resides.

== Life and work ==
Bercea was a BA student at the University of Art and Design in Cluj-Napoca, where he studied under Professor Ioan Sbarciu, graduating in 2003. He received his MA from the Art and Design University of Cluj-Napoca in 2005, and has also taught at that institution for the past five years. He is a founding member of Laika, an artists' collective that coordinates studio and exhibition space within Cluj's Fabrica de Pensule (Paintbrush Factory), and in Bucharest. Other artists associated with Laika include Serban Savu, Mircea Suciu and Vlad Olariu.

== Philosophy ==
At the age of 10, Bercea experienced the Romanian Revolution of 1989 and later the collapse of the USSR. His paintings can be seen as an amalgamation of memory, recollection and reality, communicating to the viewer a personalised vision of post-communist, early-capitalist Romania. Using what he describes as "an intensely personal archive" – family photographs, newspaper clippings, and tales from his family's history – his paintings replicate the tonal impression of a Polaroid and fabricate the sense of a fading past, sometimes focussing on the happiness of simple moments and childhood routines.

The artist skillfully weaves an intricate comparison between Abstract Expressionism and Fascism using a visual language that speaks with an articulation well beyond his twenty-eight years. He tells the timeless story of how evil and good can grow from the same parent showing how the West puts context under a microscope using it to enhance the idea of the individual but the East used it to broaden and grow society. East or West aside, Bercea's paintings remind us that Modernism has been the same everywhere.

Golden ochre-tinged yellow tones pervades much of his work, a colour that derives from an image of Chernobyl nuclear plant the painter has kept since childhood. The New York Times compared Bereca's use of colour to that of Luc Tuymans paintings. Yet where Tuymans adopts muted overtones, Bercea's use of colour is bolder and applied with force. Deep blue or sulfur-yellow skies sing when set against rich green rolling hills and the flecked grey of his concrete structures. Bercea's disparate use of colour corresponds to the 'swirling tangle of buckling roads, trees and buildings on the brink of collapse' in Bercea's 2011 Truths with Multiple Masks, which generates 'an unnerving sense of detritus and decay'.

Bogdan Iacob said of Bercea's paintings:

The types of spaces that the artist constructs don't necessarily suggest site specificity, but nevertheless they tend to sometimes allude to the post communist, early capitalist Romania, just as some of the human silhouettes in the pictures also do. But the socio-political references never suffocate the psychological realm, just as the psychological realm doesn't impeach on the aesthetic pleasure provided by the image itself. Bercea makes his art both responsive to a social and cultural context and aesthetically appealing, while also succeeding in avoiding empty technical showing-off and fake political pseudo-commitments.

Bercea's show Remains of Tomorrow was curated by Jane Neal, who wrote of the paradox of familiarity in Bercea's works:

Some of the images are unique to the Romania of this period – such as the painting derived from strange photographs of smiling young men (barely more than boys) in uniforms, posing next to taxidermied bears at country fairs. Yet aside from these bizarre depictions we can find touch points of recognition in many of the works – shared experiences of childhood that transcend boundaries of nationality and politics.

Bercea's new series of paintings recently exhibited at François Ghebaly in Los Angeles represent a ‘sulfurous yet tenaciously poignant world’ by creating a mixed documentation of memories of his native Romania. His experiences are woven together, integrating figures and fauna amid architectural features. According to the LA Times (May 7, 2016):

You don’t need to know the plant’s reputation as an antiseptic home remedy to see its lovely endurance amid a wholly leaden environment. Bercea, as he does throughout this memorable show, balances one against the other in a lithe display of utterly routine determination.
