= Virgil Bercea =

Romanian Catholic bishop

The Right Reverend Virgil Bercea
- Greek Catholic Bishop of Oradea Mare {Gran Varadino}
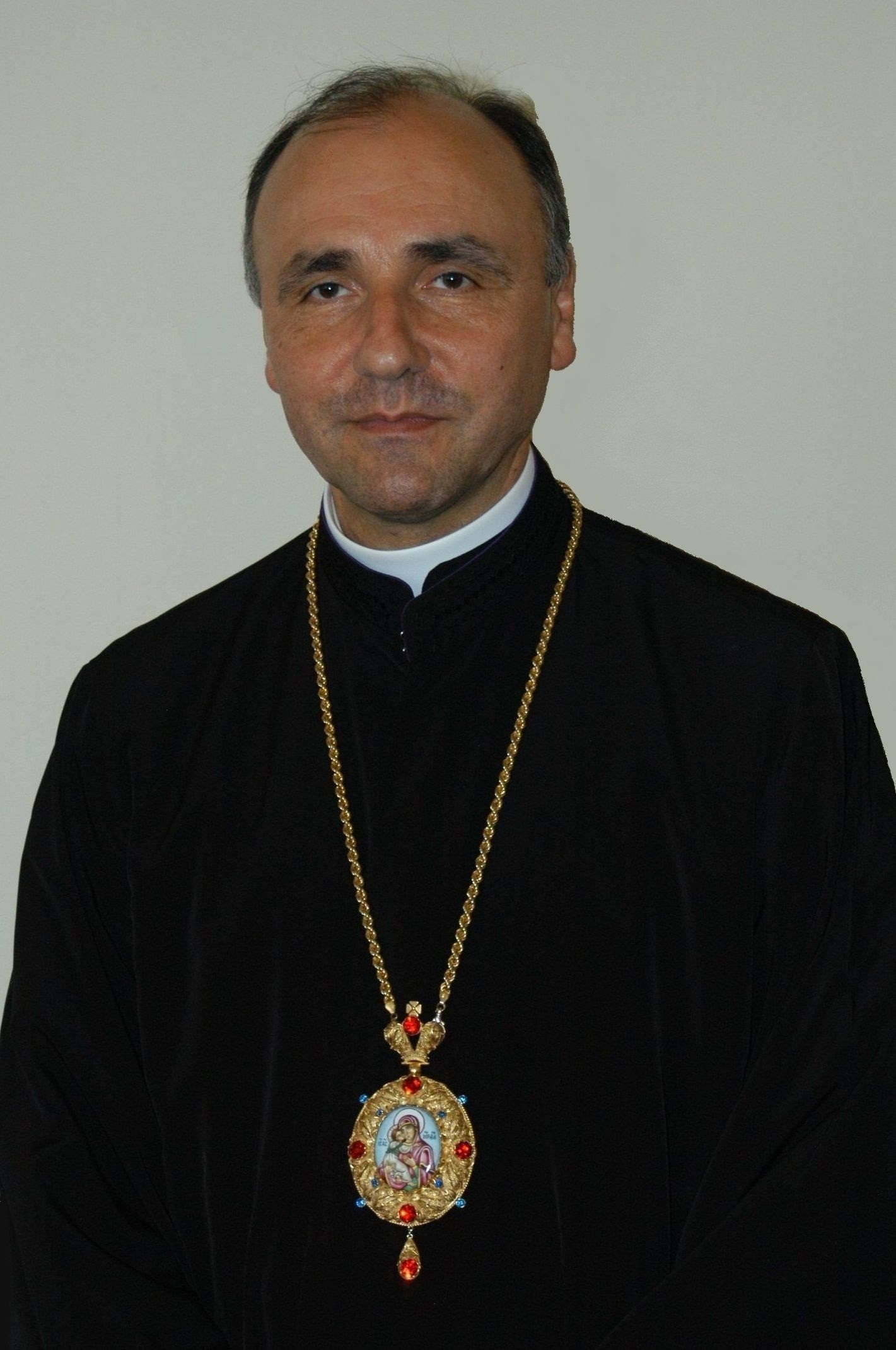
- Church: Romanian Greek Catholic Church
- Installed: 8 June 1997
- Predecessor: Vasile Hossu
- Successor: incumbent
- Other post: Auxiliary Bishop of Făgăraş and Alba Iulia (1994–1997)

Orders
- Ordination: 9 December 1982 (Priest)
- Consecration: 8 Sept 1994 (Bishop) by Lucian Mureșan

Personal details
- Born: 9 December 1957 (age 68) Habic, Mureș County, Romania

Virgil Bercea (born 9 December 1957) is the Bishop of the Eparchy of Oradea Mare of the Romanian Greek Catholic Church since 1997.

== Life ==
Virgil Bercea was born in 1957 in Habic, Mureș County, Romania. He studied in his town, and after the military service he attended the University of Agricultural Sciences and Veterinary Medicine of Cluj-Napoca from 1977 to 1981. He worked as agricultural engineer and researcher till 1990.

Supported by his uncle Archbishop Alexandru Todea, the clandestine leader of the Romanian Greek Catholic Church under the Communist Romania, Bercea secretly studied theology, and on 9 December 1982 he was secretly ordained Priest. After ordination he served in underground as priest in the town of Târgu Mureş. After Romanian Revolution of 1989 he could go to attend a specialization in dogmatic theology in the Pontifical Urbaniana University, in Rome, and from 1992 he was appointed general vicar in Blaj.

On 20 July 1994, Bercea was appointed auxiliary bishop of Greek Catholic Archeparchy of Făgăraş and Alba Iulia and so consecrated bishop by Major Archbishop Lucian Mureșan on 8 September 1994. On 6 November 1996, he was appointed coadjutor bishop of the Romanian Catholic Eparchy of Oradea Mare, to which he succeeded on 8 June 1997.

In 2000, Virgil Bercea was awarded the Romanian National Order of "Faithful Service" with the rank of Commander by the President of Romania. In 2003, he was awarded the academic title of doctor of theology by Pontifical Urbaniana University.

On 7 February 2004, Bercea was granted by the President of Romania the Order of Cultural Merit in the rank of Commander in the Religious category, "as a token of appreciation for the work of Your Holiness in the field of religion, to ecumenical and civic spirit shown and the contribution you brought it to strengthen interfaith relations." Bishop Bercea sent the following reply: "I want to thank you for this post and at the same time thank the President, but I do not accept this distinction and I will not attend the ceremony. Moreover, this manner of proceeding, that the Presidential Secretariat of State for Religion, I consider it an insult not only to the Romanian Church United with Rome, Greek Catholic, but also to the Orthodox Church or any other religion in Romania."

During Bercea's reign, the Eparchy of Oradea Mare have been returned a number of churches, along with the episcopal palace-residence and the Cathedral of St. Nicholas, which had been confiscated 58 years ago by the communist regime and given to the Romanian Orthodox Church.
