= Urmeniș =

- Commune
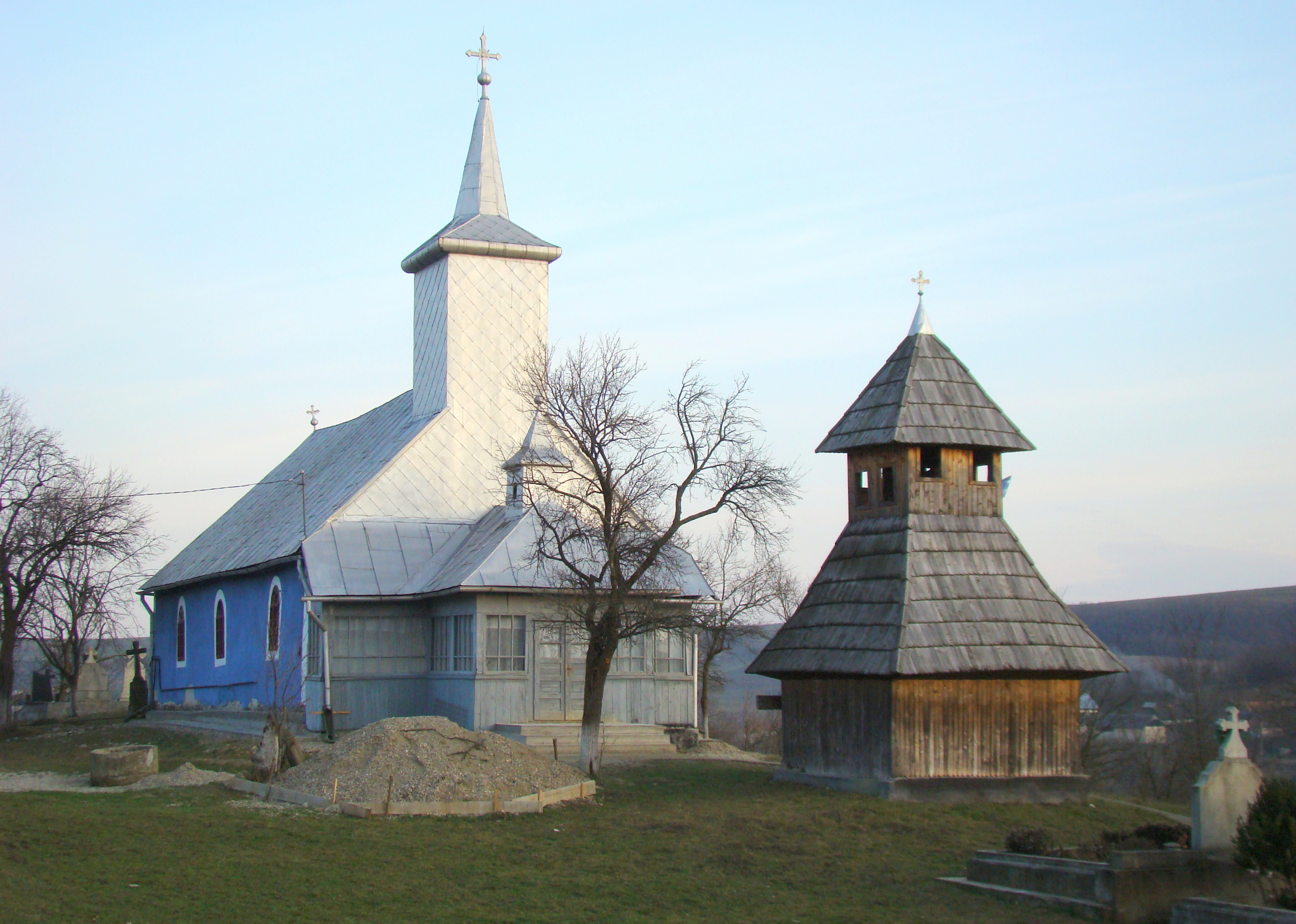
- Church in the village of Șopteriu

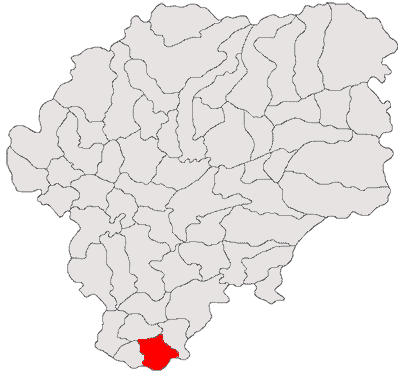
- Location in Bistrița-Năsăud County

- Location in Romania
- Coordinates: 46°46′18″N 24°21′56″E
- Country: Romania
- County: Bistrița-Năsăud

Government
  - Mayor (2020–2024): Dumitru Tomșa (PNL)
- Area: 59.28 km^{2} (22.89 sq mi)
- Elevation: 390 m (1,280 ft)
- Population (2021-12-01): 1,677
  - Density: 28.29/km^{2} (73.27/sq mi)
- Time zone: UTC+02:00 (EET)
  - Summer (DST): UTC+03:00 (EEST)
- Postal code: 427370
- Area code: +40 x59
- Vehicle reg.: BN
- Website: www.primariaurmenis.ro

Urmeniș (Hungarian: Mezőörményes or Örményes; German: Ermeden or Armenisch) is a commune in Bistrița-Năsăud County, Transylvania, Romania. It is composed of ten villages: Câmp, Coșeriu, Delureni (Mezőújlak), Fânațe (Szarvadi szénafűdűlő), Podenii (Kisújlak), Scoabe, Șopteriu (Septér), Urmeniș, Valea (Fundáta), and Valea Mare (Völgytanya).

== Geography ==
The commune is situated on the Transylvanian Plateau, at an altitude of 390 m (1,280 ft). It is located at the southern extremity of Bistrița-Năsăud County, at a distance of 55 km (34 mi) from the county seat, Bistrița, on the border with Mureș County. Urmeniș is crossed by national road DN16, which connects Cluj-Napoca, 70 km (43 mi) to the west, to Reghin, 33 km (21 mi) to the east.

== Natives ==
- Alexandru Dobra (1794–1870), Greek Catholic hierarch
