= Ioan Vancea =

Austro-Hungarian ethnic Romanian bishop

- Archeparch of Făgăraș and Alba Iulia
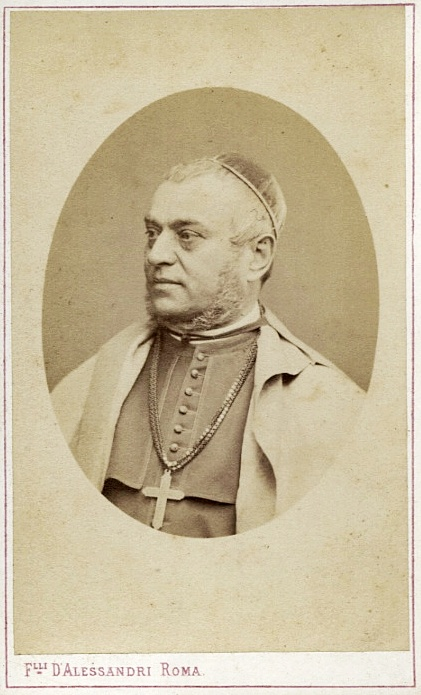
- Church: Romanian Greek Catholic Church
- Archdiocese: Major Archeparchy of Făgăraș and Alba Iulia
- In office: 21 December 1868 – 31 July 1892
- Predecessor: Alexandru Sterca-Șuluțiu
- Successor: Victor Mihaly de Apșa
- Previous post: Eparch of Gherla, Armenopoli, Szamos-Ujvár (1865-1868)

Orders
- Ordination: 29 July 1845
- Consecration: 3 December 1865 by Iosif Papp-Szilágyi

Personal details
- Born: 18 May 1820 Vășad, Curtuișeni, Bihar County, Kingdom of Hungary, Austrian Empire
- Died: 31 July 1892 (aged 72)

Ioan Vancea (Hungarian: Vancsa János; 18 May 1820 – 31 July 1892) was an Austro-Hungarian ethnic Romanian bishop of the Greek Catholic Church.

Born to noble parents in Vășad, Bihor County, he was ordained a priest in 1845 following studies in Oradea and Vienna. After the death of Ioan Alexi, he was consecrated Bishop of Gherla in 1865. Three years later, following the death of Alexandru Sterca-Șuluțiu, he was elected Archbishop of Făgăraș and Alba Iulia, enthroned at Blaj in 1869. He advocated the rights of Romanians in Transylvania and contested the authorities' policy of Magyarization. Vancea died in office in 1892.
