= Ioan Bob =

- Primate of the Romanian Greek Catholic Church
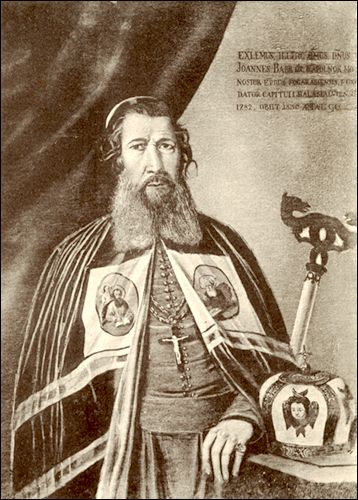
- Church: Romanian Greek Catholic Church
- Diocese: Diocese of Făgăraş
- Appointed: 15 December 1783
- Installed: 2 July 1784
- Term ended: 2 October 1830
- Predecessor: Grigore Maior
- Successor: Ioan Lemeni

Orders
- Ordination: 8 April 1778 (Priest)
- Consecration: 6 June 1784 (Bishop) by Grigore Maior

Personal details
- Born: 1739 Orman, Cluj County
- Died: 2 October 1830 (aged 90) Blaj

Ioan Bob (14 October 1739 – 2 October 1830) was Bishop of Făgăraş and Primate of the Romanian Greek Catholic Church from 1783 to his death in 1830.

== Life ==
Ioan Bob was born from a noble Romanian family in October or November 1739 in Orman, near Iclod (Hungarian: Nagy-Iklód) in Kolozs County, now Romania. He attended the secondary schools by the Jesuits but fallen ill he could not enter in seminary. In 1764, he entered as novice in the Basilian monastery of Blaj. After some months, because he could not bear the strict discipline, he withdraw from the monastic life working simply as lay administrator of the monastery. In 1773, he was sent by his friend Bishop Grigore Maior to study in Trnava where he graduated in theology. Returned to Romania, after a period of illness, he moved to Blaj where, on 25 December 1777, he was ordained a deacon and, on 8 April 1778, a priest. He worked for some months in the diocesan chancery. In 1778, he was appointed Dean in Daia Română and in 1779 to Târgu Mureş.

In 1782, the Primate of the Romanian Greek Catholic Church, the Bishop of Făgăraş Grigore Maior, resigned. According to the praxis, the electoral synod was convened in August 1782 and Bob resulted the third voted. Nevertheless, he was designated by the Emperor Joseph II on 21 October 1783, probably because he was the only non-monk voted, and confirmed by Pope Pius VI on 15 December 1783. Accordingly, he was consecrated bishop, on 6 June 1784, by Grigore Maior and enthroned on 2 July 1784.

Bob was a firm supporter of the rights of the Romanian population under the Holy Roman Empire. He actually, along with the Orthodox bishop Gherasim Adamovici, signed and brought the Supplex Libellus Valachorum before the Imperial Court of Vienna on March 30, 1792. This courageous act was rejected anyway.

Bob introduced an authoritarian model of leadership in his Church which led also to some clashes. He died on 2 October 1830.

He wrote a Dictionary of Romanian language published in Cluj (1822–1823), with about 11,000 Romanian words, which also gives the equivalent Latin and Hungarian. He promoted the printing of religious books, handbooks, and theological books. He also supported the edition of the Bible in Romanian known as Bible of Blaj (translated by Samuil Micu and published in 1795), the second translation of the Holy Scriptures in Romanian.
