= Samuil Vulcan =

- Greek Catholic Diocese of Oradea Mare
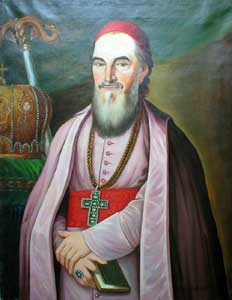
- Church: Romanian Greek Catholic Church
- Appointed: 25 March 1807
- Term ended: 25 December 1839
- Predecessor: Ignatie Darabant
- Successor: Vasile Erdelyi

Orders
- Ordination: 1784 (Priest)
- Consecration: 7 July 1807 (Bishop) by Ioan Bob

Personal details
- Born: 1 August 1758 Veza
- Died: 25 December 1839 (aged 81) Oradea

Samuil Vulcan (1 August 1758 – 25 December 1839) was the Bishop of the Diocese of Oradea Mare of the Romanian Greek Catholic Church from 1806 to 1839.

== Life ==
Vulcan was born on 1 August 1758 in Veza, a former village which has since been incorporated into Blaj town. He was ordained priest in 1784 and attended the Greek-Catholic college of Saint Barabara in Vienna. Later he moved to Lviv where he became vice-rector of the seminary.

On 25 October 1806 he was designated Greek Catholic bishop of Oradea the Austrian government and so confirmed by the Vatican on 25 March 1807. Accordingly, on 7 July 1807 he consecrated Bishop by the bishop of Făgăraş, Ioan Bob in the Cathedral of Blaj.

During his reign the diocese of Oradea enjoyed an increase in the number of parishes and faithfuls, passing from 26,232 parishioners to 153,163 souls. He tried to ensure a regular wage to his priests, and he focused on the instruction, founding many schools.

Vulcan was a supporter of Romanian culture and literature. He pleaded with the Habsburg monarchy in order to have a Romanian bishop appointed in place of a Serbian bishop for the Orthodox diocese of Arad.

Vulcan died in Oradea on 25 December 1839.

== Miscellaneous ==
In 1828 he founded a college in the Transylvanian town of Beiuş, which is named after him.
