= Romanian Catholic Eparchy of Oradea Mare =

Greek Catholic eparchy in Romania

Eparchy of Oradea Mare (Gran Varadino) Dioecesis Magnovaradinensis Romenorum Episcopia de Oradea Mare
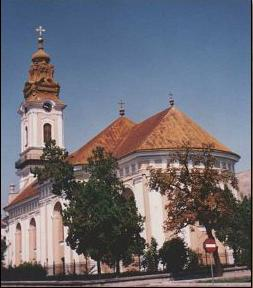
- The Cathedral of Saint Nicholas in Oradea

Location
- Country: Romania
- Ecclesiastical province: Făgăraş and Alba Iulia
- Metropolitan: Major Archeparchy of Făgăraș and Alba Iulia
- Population: (as of 2013); 87,000

Information
- Sui iuris church: Romanian Greek Catholic Church
- Rite: Byzantine
- Established: 23 June 1777
- Cathedral: Cathedral of St Nicholas, Oradea

Current leadership
- Pope: Leo XIV
- Major Archbishop: Sede Vacante
- Bishop: Virgil Bercea

Map
- Church administrative divisions

Website
- Website

The Romanian Catholic Eparchy of Oradea Mare is an eparchy (equivalent to a diocese in the Latin Church) of the Romanian Greek Catholic Church which is an Eastern Catholic particular church of the Catholic Church that is in full communion with the Holy See. Its uses the Byzantine Rite in the Romanian language in its liturgical services. It was founded in 1777. It is a suffragan diocese of the Major Archeparchy of Făgăraș and Alba Iulia. The eparchy's cathedral church is the Cathedral of Saint Nicholas which is situated in the city of Oradea, Romania. The incumbent eparch is Virgil Bercea.

== History ==
When it was founded in 1777, followers of the Greek Rite having been up to that time under the jurisdiction of the Latin bishop. Originally the see was a suffragan of Esztergom (Gran); when, however, in 1853 the Greek Catholic Diocese of Făgăraș and Alba Iulia became the Archdiocese of Făgăraș and Alba Iulia, the diocese of Oradea Mare was transferred to its jurisdiction. The see is divided into six archidiaconates and 19 vice-archidiaconates.

== List of Eparchs ==
The list of the eparch (bishops) of the Greek Catholic Diocese of Oradea Mare is:

- Meletie Covaci (born 1707, converted to the Greek Catholic Church in 1736, reigned 1748–1775 as auxiliary bishop of the Latin bishop of Oradea)
- Moise Dragoș (born 1725, reigned 1775–1787, under his reign in 1777 the diocese became independent from the Latin bishop]
- Ignațiu Darabant (born 1730, reigned 1788–1805)
- Samuil Vulcan (born 1758, reigned 1806–1839)
- Vasile Erdeli (born 1794, reigned 1842–1862)
- Iosif Papp-Szilágyi (Sălăjeanul) (born 1813, reigned 1863–1873)
- Ioan Olteanu (born 1839, reigned 1873–1877)
- Mihail Pavel (born 1827, reigned 1879–1902)
- Demetriu Radu (born 1861, reigned 1903–1920)
- Valeriu Traian Frențiu (born 1875, reign started in 1922. In 1948 the Communist Romania abolished the Greek Catholic Church. Frențiu was persecuted and died in prison in 1952)
- Iuliu Hirțea (born 1914, he was the clandestine bishop of Oradea from 1952. He spent many years in prison. Died in 1978)
  - 1978–1990 vacant due to the persecution under the Communist Regime, until the Romanian Revolution of 1989
- Vasile Hossu (born 1919, reigned 1990–1997)
- Virgil Bercea (born 1957, reigned 1997–incumbent)

== See also ==
- Alexander Ratiu (a priest of the eparchy)
