= List of cathedrals in Romania =

This is the list of cathedrals in Romania sorted by denomination.

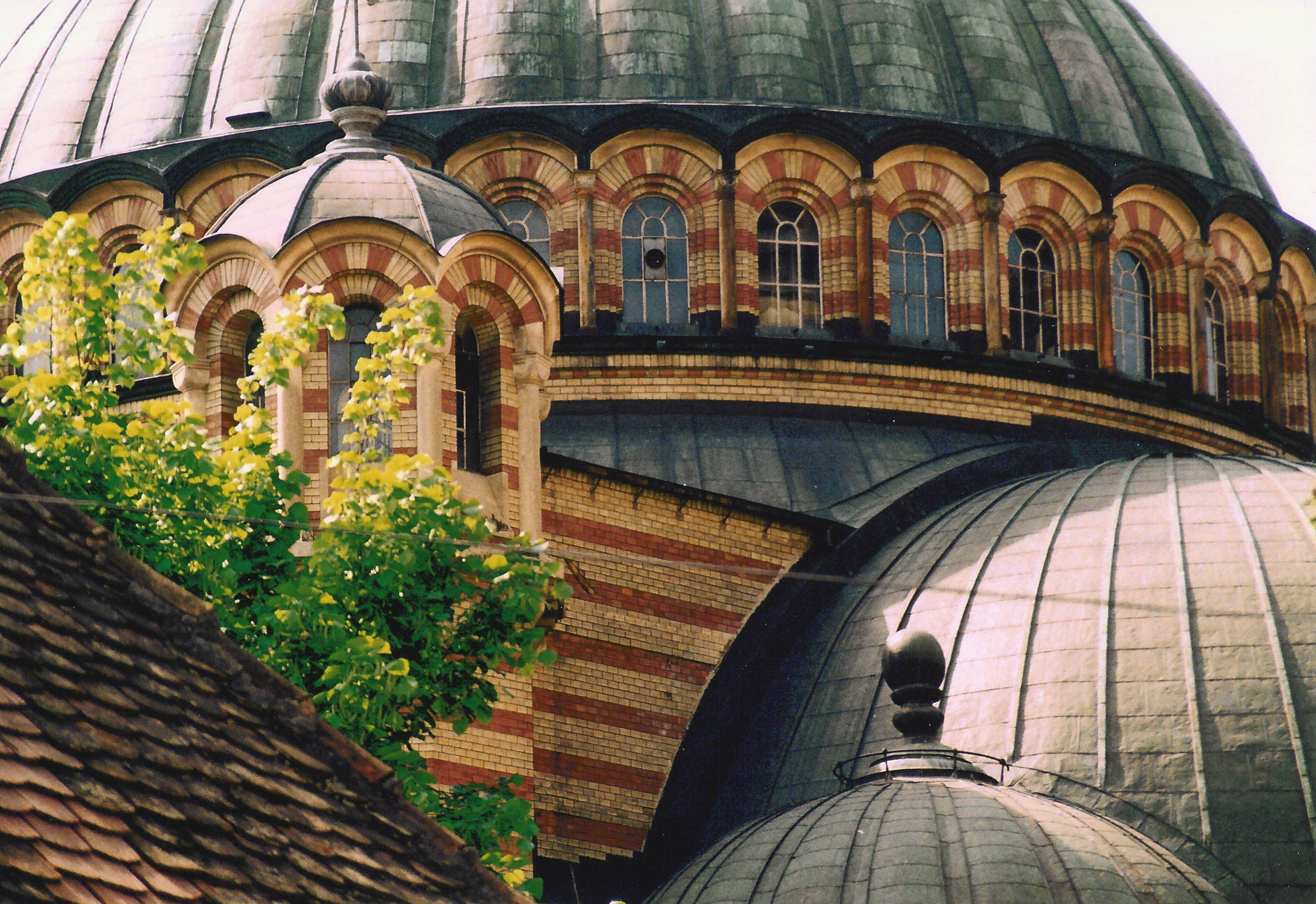
Holy Trinity Cathedral in Sibiu (Orthodox)

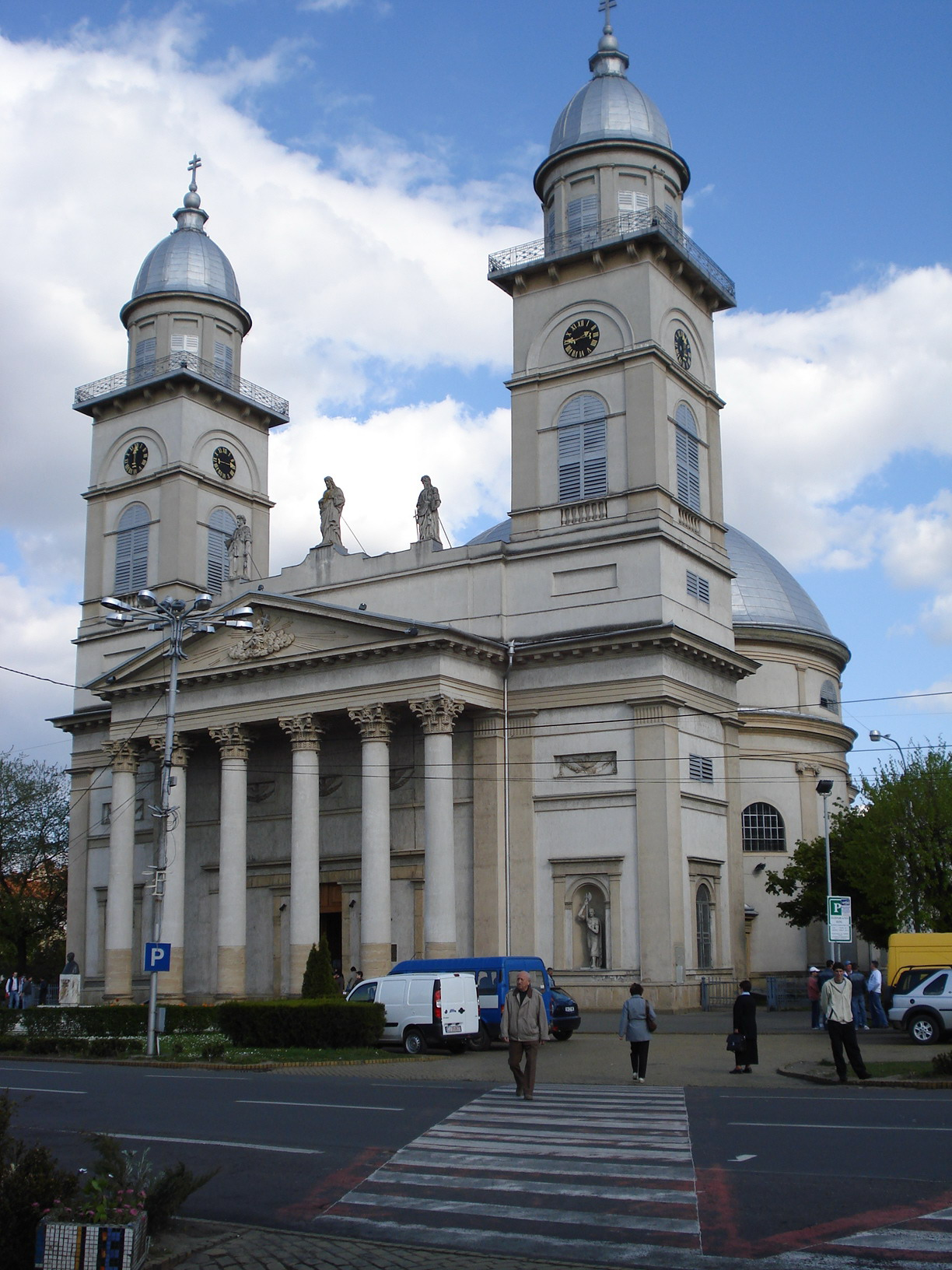
Ascension of the Lord Cathedral in Satu Mare (Roman Catholic)

== Eastern Orthodox ==
=== Romanian Orthodox ===
Cathedrals of the Romanian Orthodox Church:

- Coronation Cathedral in Alba Iulia
- Cathedral of Saint Alexander in Alexandria
- Holy Trinity Cathedral, Arad (since 2009) / Church of the Nativity of Saint John the Baptist (Arad, Romania) - former cathedral (until 2009)
- Holy Trinity Cathedral in Baia Mare (under construction)
- Patriarchal Cathedral of Saints Constantine and Helen in Bucharest
- Romanian People's Salvation Cathedral in Bucharest (under construction)
- Ascension of the Lord Cathedral in Bacău
- Dormition of the Theotokos Cathedral in Buzău
- Cathedral of Saint George in Caransebeș
- Dormition of the Theotokos Metropolitan Cathedral in Cluj-Napoca
- Cathedral of Saints Peter and Paul in Constanța
- Metropolitan Cathedral of Saint Demetrius in Craiova
- Curtea de Argeș Cathedral
- Cathedral of Saint Nicholas in Curtea de Argeș
- Nativity of the Theotokos Cathedral in Drobeta-Turnu Severin
- Resurrection of the Lord Cathedral in Fălticeni (under construction)
- Cathedral of Saint Nicholas in Galați
- Dormition of the Theotokos Cathedral in Giurgiu
- Hunedoara Cathedral in Hunedoara
- Cathedral of Saints Peter and Paul in Huși
- Metropolitan Cathedral in Iași
- Moon Church in Oradea
- Cathedral of Saint George in Pitești
- Cathedral of Saint Nicholas in Râmnicu Vâlcea
- Cathedral of the Holy Voievodes in Roman
- Cathedral of Saint George in Sfântu Gheorghe
- Metropolitan Holy Trinity Cathedral in Sibiu
- Ascension of the Lord Cathedral in Slobozia
- Cathedral of Saint George in Suceava
- Cathedral of the Nativity in Suceava
- Holy Trinity Cathedral in Târgoviște
- Cathedral of Saint George in Tecuci
- Metropolitan Cathedral of the Three Holy Hierarchs in Timișoara
- Cathedral of Saint Nicholas in Tulcea
- Saint Paraschiva Cathedral in Zalău

=== Serbian Orthodox ===
Cathedrals of the Serbian Orthodox Church:

- Cathedral of the Ascension in Timișoara

== Catholic ==
=== Latin Church ===
Catholic cathedrals of the Latin Church:

- Saint Michael Cathedral in Alba Iulia
- Saint Joseph Cathedral in Bucharest
- Our Lady Queen of Iași Cathedral in Iași
- Saint Mary Cathedral Basilica in Oradea
- Ascension Cathedral in Satu Mare
- Saint George Cathedral in Timișoara

=== Romanian Greek Catholic Church ===
Cathedrals of the Romanian Greek Catholic Church:

- Holy Trinity Cathedral in Blaj
- Transfiguration Cathedral in Cluj-Napoca
- Descent of the Holy Spirit Cathedral in Lugoj
- Assumption of Mary Cathedral in Baia Mare
- Saint Nicholas Cathedral in Oradea
- Saint Basil the Great Cathedral in Bucharest

=== Armenian Catholic ===
Cathedral of the Armenian Catholic Church:

- Holy Trinity Cathedral in Gherla

== Lutheran ==
Lutheran cathedrals in Romania:

- Biserica Neagră in Brașov
- Sibiu Lutheran Cathedral in Sibiu

== Calvinist ==
Cathedrals of the Reformed Church in Romania:

- Reformed Church in Cluj
- Two-towered Reformed Church in Oradea

== See also ==
- List of cathedrals
