= Suceava Cathedral =

Suceava Cathedral may refer to one of two Romanian Orthodox churches in Suceava, Romania:

- Saint John the New Monastery (built between 1514 and 1522, the seat of the Archdiocese of Suceava and Rădăuți)
- Cathedral of the Nativity (built between 1991 and 2015, a monumental parish church)
