= Elisabetin Greek Catholic Church =

Church in Elisabetin, Timișoara, Romania

Church of St. Mary Queen of Peace and Unity
- Biserica „Sfânta Maria Regina Păcii și a Unității”
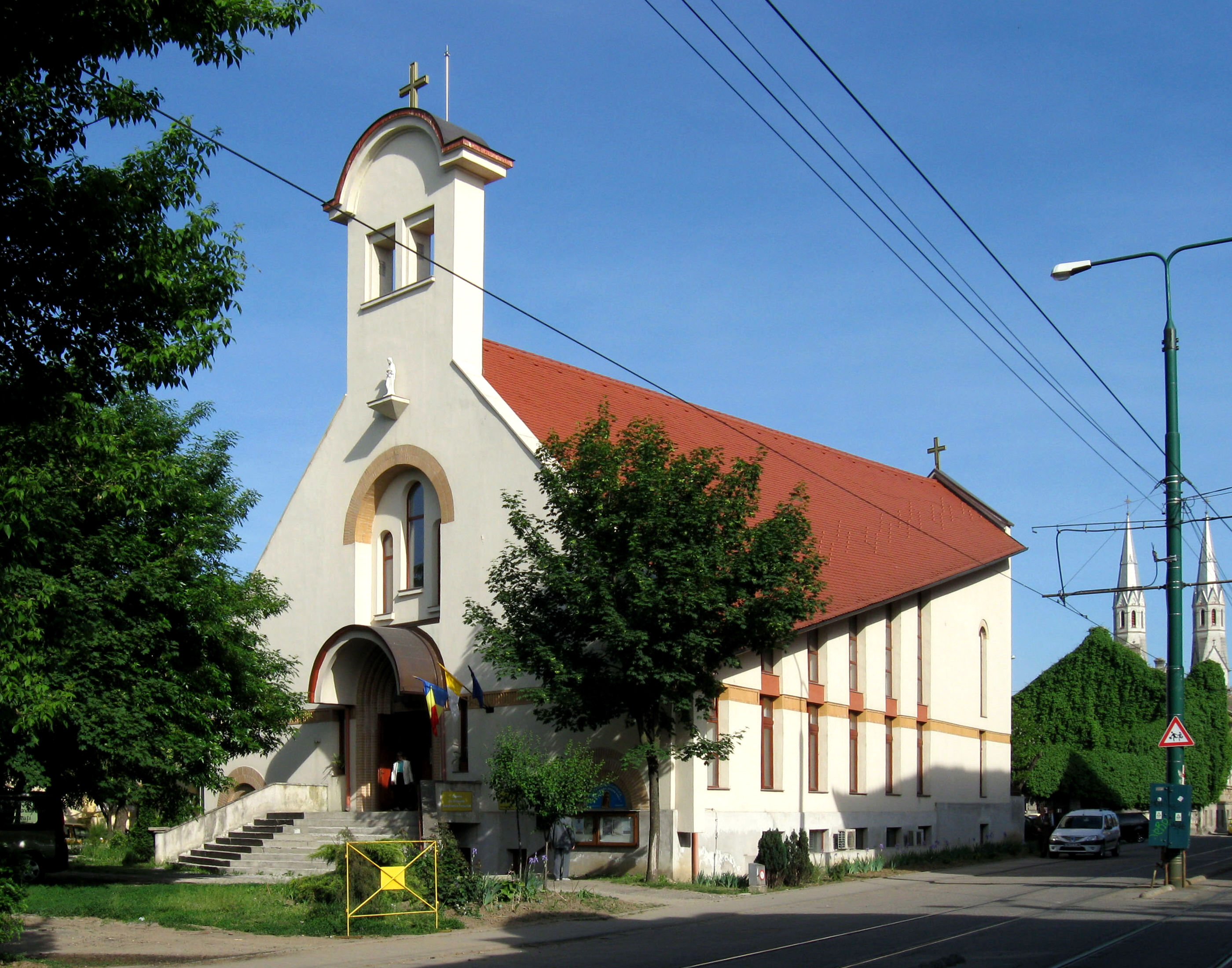

Religion
- Affiliation: Greek Catholic
- Ownership: Eparchy of Lugoj
- Patron: Saint Mary
- Year consecrated: 2008
- Status: Active

Location
- Location: 34 Gheorghe Doja Street, Timișoara
- Interactive map of Church of St. Mary Queen of Peace and Unity
- Coordinates: 45°44′35″N 21°13′26″E

Architecture
- Groundbreaking: 1999
- Completed: 2005

Website
- reginapacis.ro

The Church of St. Mary Queen of Peace and Unity is a Greek Catholic church in the Elisabetin district of Timișoara. It is located in Doina Park, on Gheorghe Doja Street.

== History ==
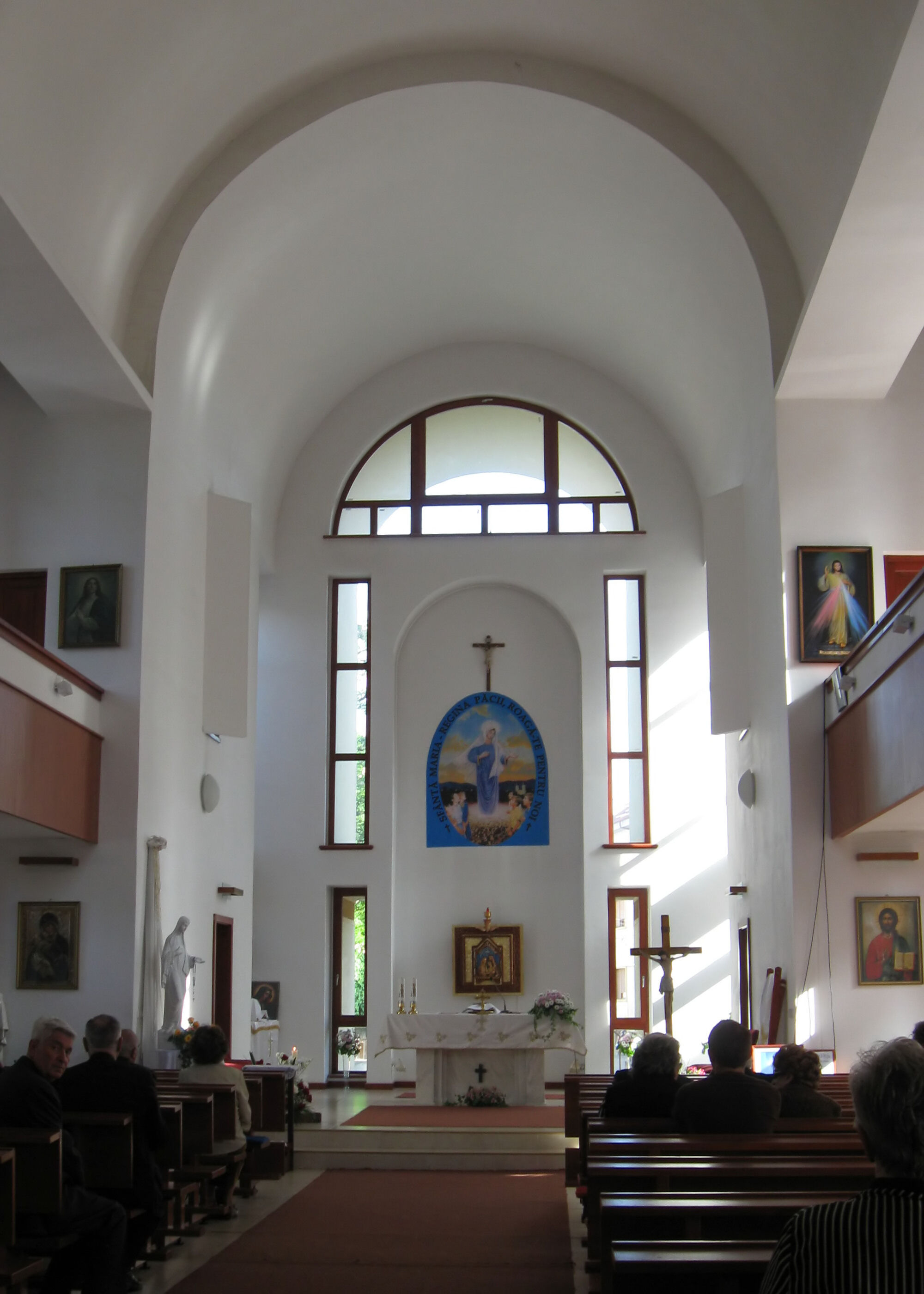
Church interior

After the foundation stone was laid on 21 November 1999, construction work on the church began in May 2001. On 16 June 2003, the chapel in the semi-basement was consecrated, and services have been held here regularly since December 2003. Construction work was completed in October 2005. After the roof was laid in the fall of 2005, work apparently stalled, but on the main level, the interior walls were plastered. In 2007 the basement was arranged: the chapel, the catechesis room and the two counseling offices and the windows and doors were installed on the main level.

The consecration of the church took place on 25 May 2008. Numerous religious and secular dignitaries attended the event, including the Apostolic Nuncio Francisco-Javier Lozano Sebastián, the Metropolitan of the Romanian Orthodox Church Nicolae Corneanu, the Greek Catholic Bishop of Lugoj Alexandru Mesian, the Roman Catholic Bishop of the Diocese of Timișoara Martin Roos, the envoy of the Parish of Medjugorje Francesco Rizzi and the mayor of Timișoara Gheorghe Ciuhandu.
