= Nicolae Corneanu =

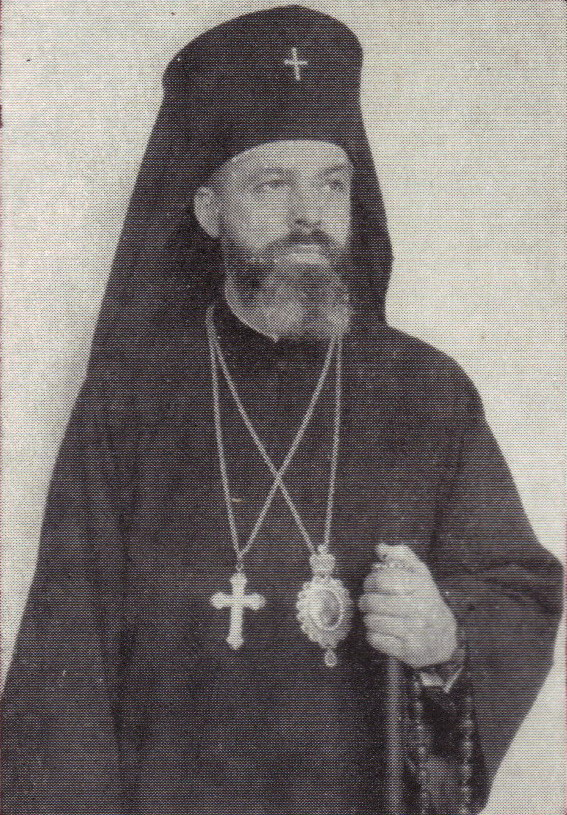
Metropolite Nicolae Corneanu în 1967

Nicolae Corneanu (Romanian pronunciation: [nikoˈla.e korˈne̯anu]; 21 November 1923 – 28 September 2014) was a Romanian metropolitan bishop of the Romanian Orthodox Church who led the Metropolis of Banat from 1962 until his death in 2014.

Corneanu was born in Caransebeș. In 1992, he was elected an honorary member of the Romanian Academy. He died in Timișoara, aged 90.

== Honours ==
=== National honours ===
- (Romania) Romanian Royal Family: 34th Knight of the Royal Decoration of the Cross of the Romanian Royal House
- Romanian Republic: Grand Cross of the Order of the Star of Romania
- (Romania) Romanian Republic: Grand Cross of the National Order of Merit
- Romanian People's Republic: Order of the Star of the Romanian People's Republic, 2nd class

== Controversies ==
In the early 1990s, the Orthodox Archbishop of Timișoara, Nicolae Corneanu, returned approximately 50 churches, including the cathedral in Lugoj, to the Greek Catholic Church. However, due to his actions, the Orthodox Holy Synod marginalized Archbishop Corneanu, and his fellow clergymen criticized him.

Corneanu promoted unity between the Roman Catholic and the Eastern Orthodox Churches. On May 25, 2008, during the consecration of the Queen of Peace parish church in Timișoara, he became the first Orthodox bishop after centuries to receive communion at a Catholic Liturgy. Metropolitan Nicolae shared the Eucharistic Chalice during the same Liturgy with two Catholic bishops, Romanian Byzantine Catholic Bishop Alexandru Mesian of Lugoj and Archbishop Francisco-Javier Lozano, the apostolic nuncio to Romania at that moment.

Two weeks later, on June 11, 2008, the event was met with hostility by Patriarch Kirill (at the moment Head of the Moscow Patriarchate, Department for External Church Relations Metropolitan Kirill). Being under pressure from external ecclesiastic entities (most notable from Holy Mount Athos representatives and from the Head of the Moscow Patriarchate, Department for External Church Relations), the Holy Synod of the Romanian Orthodox Church gave in and chastised Metropolitan Nicolae. On July 8–9, 2008 Patriarch Daniel convoked in Bucharest a special assembly of the Holy Synod of the Romanian Orthodox Church. Under the counsel of the Holy Spirit, the majority of bishops decided to forgive Metropolitan Nicolae. Patriarch Daniel concluded that: "Through a sincere, deep theological dialogue, the dogmas that separate the Catholic Church from the Orthodox Church can be redefined".
