= Ioan Șișeștean =

Ioan Șișeștean (11 June 1936 – 12 April 2011) was a Romanian prelate of the Greek Catholic Church who was the bishop of the Greek Catholic Diocese of Maramureș in Romania from 1994 until his death.

== Biography ==
He was born on 11 June 1936 in Șișești, Maramureș County, the eldest son of eight children born into a peasant family. He attended primary school in his home town and the Gheorghe Șincai Theoretical High School in Baia Mare. He worked briefly as a substitute teacher and then as a laboratory technician in a factory in Baia Mare. He studied theology clandestinely and was secretly ordained a priest on 13 March 1972 by Bishop Ioan Dragomir.

Șișeștean taught dogmatic theology at the Greek-Catholic Theological Institute in Baia Mare when it reopened. Bishop Lucian Mureșan named him Vicar of Maramureș early in 1994 and he was named to replace Mureșan as bishop on 4 July 1994.

He received his episcopal consecration on 11 September 1994 from Bishop Lucian Mureșan, assisted by Bishops Virgil Bercea and Alexandru Mesian.

Șișeștean died of a heart attack on 12 April 2011 in Baia Sprie.
