= Pădurea =

Pădurea may refer to several villages in Romania:

- Pădurea, a village in Meteș Commune, Alba County
- Pădurea, a village in Șăulia Commune, Mureș County
