= Alexandru Rusu =

Romanian bishop (1884–1963)

Blessed Alexandru Rusu
- Bishop of Maramureş
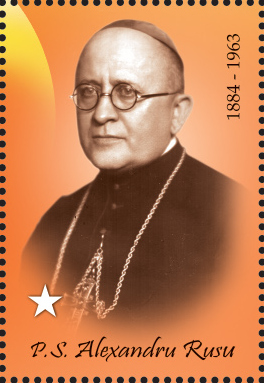
- Church: Romanian Greek Catholic Church
- Diocese: Maramureş
- See: Maramureş
- Appointed: 17 October 1930
- Installed: 2 February 1931
- Term ended: 9 May 1963
- Predecessor: Iuliu Hossu (administrator)
- Successor: Ioan Dragomir (administrator)

Orders
- Ordination: 20 July 1910 by Victor Mihaly de Apșa
- Consecration: 30 January 1931 by Vasile Suciu

Personal details
- Born: Alexandru Rusu; 22 November 1884 Saulia de Campie, Romania
- Died: 9 May 1963 (aged 78) Gherla Prison, Gherla, Romania
- Education: University of Budapest

Sainthood
- Feast day: 2 June
- Venerated in: Romanian Greek Catholic Church; Roman Catholic Church
- Beatified: 2 June 2019; Câmpia Libertății, Blaj, Romania by Pope Francis
- Attributes: Episcopal attire

Alexandru Rusu (22 November 1884 – 9 May 1963) was a Romanian bishop of the Greek-Catholic Church. One of twelve children born to a priest in Șăulia Commune, Mureș County, he was himself ordained a priest in 1910. Rusu was ordained Bishop of Maramureş in 1931.

After the church's leadership fell vacant in 1941, he was chosen its new head (Major Archbishop of Fagaraş and Alba Iulia) in 1946, a decision approved by the Holy See but not by the Communist-dominated Petru Groza government. Rusu was arrested in October 1948 by the authorities of the new Communist regime which had outlawed the church, and he was held in two monasteries, in Sighet prison, and then in two other monasteries. In 1957, a military tribunal found him guilty of "instigation and high treason". Rusu was sentenced to 25 years of imprisonment and he ended up at Gherla prison, where he died of illness.

On 19 March 2019, Pope Francis approved the beatification of Rusu and six other Greek-Catholic bishops who died while serving as political prisoners under the communist regime in Romania in the mid-20th century. Rusu and the other six Romanian Catholic prelates were beatified personally by Pope Francis at Liberty Field in Blaj, Romania by Pope Francis on 2 June 2019.
