= Vasile Bizău =

Greek-Catholic bishop

The Right Reverend Vasile Bizău
- Bishop of Maramureș
- Church: Romanian Greek Catholic Church
- Diocese: Greek Catholic Diocese of Maramureș
- Appointed: 11 June 2011
- Installed: 23 July 2011
- Predecessor: Ioan Șișeștean
- Other post: Curial Bishop of Făgăraș and Alba Iulia

Orders
- Ordination: 31 August 1997
- Consecration: 16 December 2007 by Lucian Mureșan

Personal details
- Born: October 14, 1969 (age 56) Dragomirești, Maramureș County, Romania

Vasile Bizău (born October 14, 1969) is a Romanian bishop of the Greek-Catholic Church.

== Biography ==
He was born in Dragomirești, Maramureș County into a Greek-Catholic family that continued in the faith while the church was banned under the communist regime.

He graduated from high school in Baia Mare in 1988 and studied theology there from 1990 to 1993. From 1993 to 2000 he studied at the Pontifical Gregorian University in Rome through the master's degree level, pursuing doctoral studies in the same city from 2001 to 2002.

Ordained deacon in Giulești Commune in 1996, he became a priest the following year in Baia Mare. With his return to Romania in 2000, he became parish priest at two churches in Baia Mare, and started teaching at the Northern University.

Elected bishop in 2007, he was proclaimed titular bishop of Appiaria by Pope Benedict XVI and consecrated at the Cathedral of the Holy Trinity in Blaj.

In 2011, Archbishop Lucian Mureșan transferred Bizău to Baia Mare, where he became Bishop of Maramureș.
