= Gheorghe Șincai National College =

Gheorghe Șincai National College (Romanian: Colegiul Național "Gheorghe Șincai") may refer to one of two educational institutions in Romania:

- Gheorghe Șincai National College (Baia Mare)
- Gheorghe Șincai National College (Bucharest)
