= Romanian Catholic Eparchy of Maramureș =

Greek Catholic eparchy in Romania

Coordinates: 47.6498°N 23.5713°E

Eparchy of Maramureş Dioecesis Maramuresensis Eparhia de Maramureș
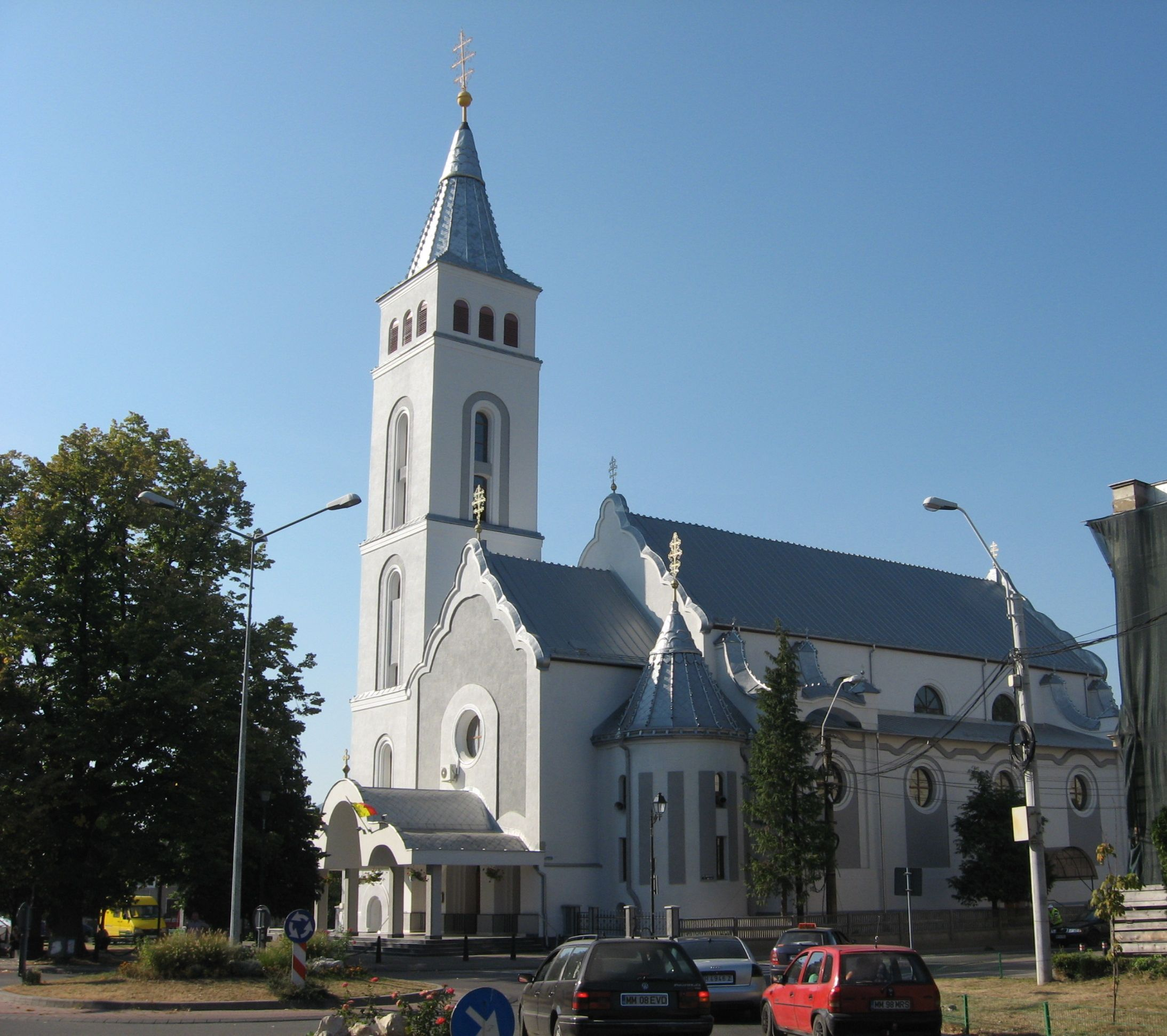
- Diocesan Cathedral of the Assumption (de jure)

Location
- Country: Romania
- Ecclesiastical province: Făgăraş and Alba Iulia
- Metropolitan: Major Archeparchy of Făgăraş and Alba Iulia
- Population: (as of 2013); 53,250

Information
- Sui iuris church: Romanian Greek Catholic Church
- Rite: Byzantine
- Established: 5 June 1930
- Cathedral: Cathedral of the Assumption in Baia Mare

Current leadership
- Pope: Leo XIV
- Major Archbishop: Sede vacante
- Bishop: Vasile Bizău

Map
- Church administrative divisions

Website
- Website

The Romanian Catholic Eparchy of Maramureș is an eparchy (equivalent to a diocese in the Latin Church) of the Romanian Greek Catholic Church which is an Eastern Catholic particular church of the Catholic Church that is in full communion with the Holy See. Its uses the Byzantine Rite in the Romanian language in its liturgical services. It was founded in 1927. It is a suffragan diocese of the Major Archeparchy of Făgăraș and Alba Iulia. The eparchy's cathedral church is the Cathedral of the Assumption which is situated in the city of Baia Mare, Romania. The incumbent eparch is Vasile Bizău.

== History ==
The eparchy was founded as a consequence of the Concordate between the Holy See and The Romanian State concluded on May 10, 1927 and ratified on June 10, 1929. With the Bull Sollemni Conventione of June 5, 1930, Catholic Hierarchy of both rites was established all over the territory of the Romanian Kingdom; it was then that the creation of a new diocese, of Maramureș was decided. Its centre was to be at Baia Mare and it was suffragan of the Metropolitanate of Alba Iulia and Făgăraș.

The Diocese of Maramureș included 201 Romanian parishes and all the 38 Ruthene parishes existing on Romanian territory. It was laid under the temporary administration of Dr. Iuliu Hossu, the bishop of Cluj-Gherla.

The first Bishop of this Diocese, appointed by the Holy See on October 16, 1930, with the approval of the Romanian Government, was Dr. Alexandru Rusu, consecrated on January 30, 1931 and enthroned in his cathedral on February 2, 1931. He led the diocese until 1948, when he was arrested; he died in prison in May 1963.

In 1948, with the Decree nr. 358 of December 1, the whole Romanian Church united with Rome was declared illegal.

The second bishop of the diocese, who acted as apostolic administrator, was Dr. Ioan Dragomir, consecrated in clandestinity on March 6, 1949, at the nunciature in Bucharest. He was arrested in 1951 and remained in prison until the amnesty of 1964. After that date, he worked in clandestinity. He died on April 25, 1985.

On August 9, 1987, at the diocesan chapter, attended also by Metropolite Alexandru Todea, Fr. Lucian Mureșan was elected Ordinarius of the Diocese of Maramureș.

On May 27, 1990, he was consecrated bishop at Baia Mare. Eventually he was appointed Metropolite of the Romanian Church United with Rome. The Diocese of Maramureș was then led by Fr. Ioan Șișeștean, appointed bishop on June 20, 1993, and consecrated on September 11, 1993.

== See also ==
- Romanian Church United with Rome, Greek-Catholic
