= George Maior =

Romanian politician and diplomat

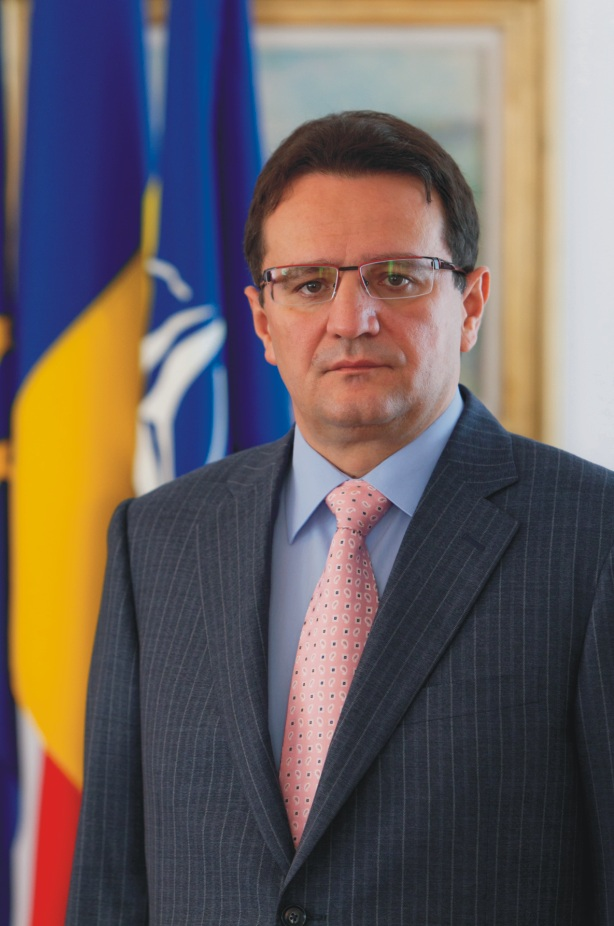
George Cristian Maior

George-Cristian Maior

George-Cristian Maior (16 November 1967, Cluj-Napoca) is a Romanian politician and diplomat. He was a member of the Romanian Parliament, elected as a senator from the Social Democrat Party. He was the head of the Romanian Intelligence Service between October 2006 – January 2015 and ambassador to the United States since September 17, 2015. His father, Liviu Maior, is the former Minister of Education (1992–1996) and ambassador to Canada.

== Biography ==
George Cristian Maior was born on November 16, 1967. He is the son of the Romanian historian Liviu Maior. He graduated from the Law Faculty of Babeș-Bolyai University in Cluj-Napoca (1988–1991) and in 1992 he obtained a Master of Arts in International and Comparative Law from the Faculty of Comparative Law of George Washington University in Washington, D.C.

In 1998, he obtained the doctoral title in International Law at the Babeș-Bolyai University in Cluj-Napoca, with the thesis "National and European in the jurisprudence of the Strasbourg European Court" which was nominated for the Most Prize awarded by UNESCO. In 2001 he graduated the Defence National College from Bucharest.

After graduating with a Master in 1992, he worked as a diplomat in the Romanian Foreign Affairs Ministry, between 1997 and 1999 being appointed as chargé d'affaires at the Romanian Embassy in Ireland. After the Social Democrat Party won the election, George Maior was appointed as State Secretary and Head of the Euro-Atlantic and Defense Policy Department of the National Defense Ministry. From this position, he led the NATO accession negotiations, concluding with a successful active integration of Romania in the Alliance and the signing of several contracts for the acquisition of military equipment (2 frigates and numerous flying equipments). On August 24, 2004 he received the diplomatic rank of Ambassador.

At the election that took place in November 2000 he was elected as a senator for the Alba County, on the PSD lists. In this quality he was chairman of the National Security, Public Order and Defense Committee of the Senate of the Romanian Parliament (June 2005 – 5 October 2006), vice-president of the committee for the investigation of allegations regarding the existence of CIA detention centers on Romanian soil, member of the Committee for Human Rights, minorities and cults, member of the joint Standing Committee of the Chamber of Deputies and the Senate for the exercise of parliamentary control over the activity of the Foreign Intelligence Service and member of the Romanian Parliament's delegation at the Occidental European Union's Gathering. In November 2005 he was the only Romanian guest at the international conference "Information in the XXIst century". He resigned from the Romanian Parliament on October 5, 2006, being replaced by Liliana Lucia Tomoiagă.

On the October 4th 2006 George Maior was validated by both the Romanian Parliaments' Chambers as Head of the Romanian Intelligence Service with 285 votes "for" and 123 "against" from the total of 408, after initially receiving 7 out of 9 favorable votes in the specialized committee of the Parliament. He was appointed through Decision no. 32 of the Romanian Parliament.

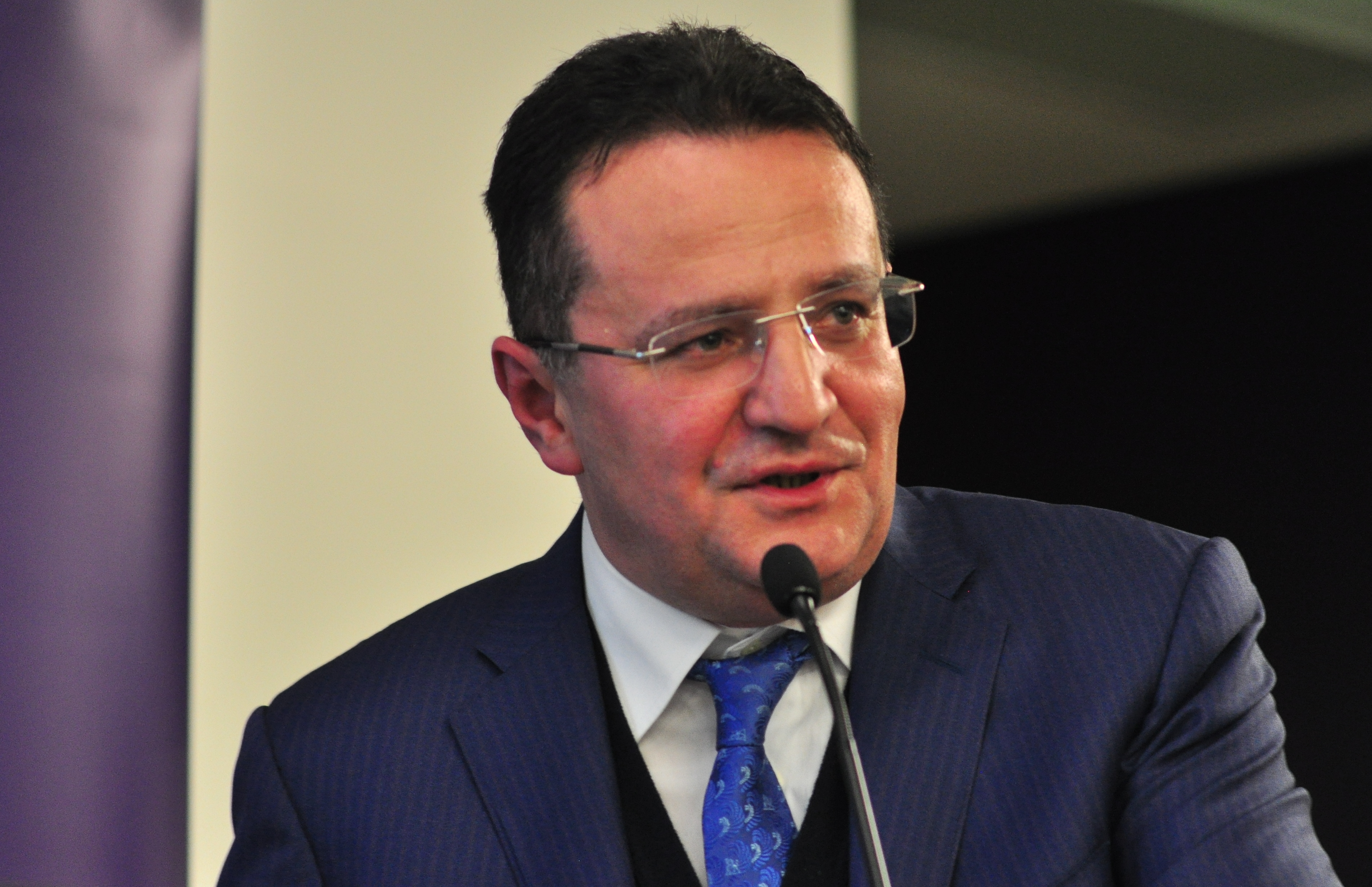
Ambassador Maior speaking at the University of Washington, Seattle, 2017

George Cristian Maior has been accredited as Ambassador Extraordinary and Plenipotentiary of Romania to the United States, as per Decree no 583 of June 29, 2015, signed by the President of Romania. He has officially commenced his mandate on September 17, 2015, upon presenting his Letters of Credence to the Honorable Barack Obama, President of the United States of America.

He is a university professor and PhD coordinator at the Department of International Relations and European Integration within the National School of Political Studies and Public Administration in Bucharest. He published a great number of articles and books covering topics from human rights and public law to international relations, strategic thinking, security and intelligence studies.

He was invited as keynote speaker at prestigious universities, organizations, and think-tanks (Harvard Kennedy School of Government, George Washington University, American University, National Intelligence University, Atlantic Council, Center for Strategic and International Studies, Chicago Council on Global Affairs, Center for European Policy Analysis, AIPAC, etc.). He is a member of the Honorary Board of Advisors of the "National Student Leadership Foundation."

The President of Romania awarded George Cristian Maior the National Order of "Faithful Service" in rank of Knight, the National Order "Star of Romania" in rank of Knight and the National Order "Star of Romania" in rank of Officer. In April 2014, he became a Knight of the "Legion of Honor" order, a title conferred by the President of France. In 2017, the Director of the Central Intelligence Agency (CIA) awarded George Cristian Maior the "Earl Warren Medallion" for the outstanding partnership with the United States and exceptional leadership during his tenure as Director of Romanian Intelligence Service (SRI). Additionally, he is a Doctor Honoris Causa of the Military Technical Academy in Bucharest, of the "Andrei Saguna" University in Constanta and of the West University in Timișoara.

== Family life ==
He is married to Anamaria Buzura, daughter of the writer Augustin Buzura. Together they have two children.

== Distinctions ==
As recognition of his competence and professionalism proved during the process of reforming and developing of Romania, the following distinctions have been awarded to George Maior:

- Doctor Honoris Causa awarded by Military Technical Academy (July, 28th 2015)
- Doctor Honoris Causa awarded by Andrei Saguna University from Constanta (Mai, 5th 2015)
- Doctor Honoris Causa Beneficiorum Publicorum awarded by Universitatea de Vest from Timișoara (October, 3rd 2014)
- Order of Legion of Honour, Chevalier (Knight), awarded by the president of France (April 2014)
- Order of the Star of Romania, Commodore rank (March 2013)
- Order of the Star of Romania, Officer rank (March 2010)
- Order of the Star of Romania, Knight rank (December 2008)
- Order of Faithful Service, Knight rank (November 2002)
- Meritorious Service Medal of Alabama awarded by the governor of Alabama
- Awarded with "Earl Warren Medallion" by The Director of the Central Intelligence Agency (CIA) (May 2017)

== Awards ==
- 1998: his doctoral thesis "National and European in the jurisprudence of the Strasbourg European Court" was nominated for the Most Prize awarded by UNESCO.
- 2004: honorific diploma awarded by the Military Technical Academy for outstanding merits in sustaining, development and modernizing of the military polytechnic education system and of the university scientific research system.
- 2009: Romanian Book Fair (Salonul Cărții Românești) special prize, awarded at Iași, for the book "Noul Aliat – regândirea politicii de apărare a României la începutul secolului XXI" (The New Ally - rethinking Romania's defense policy at the beginning of the 21st century), RAO publishing, București;
- 2012: prize awarded by the "Balcanii și Europa" magazine for "vocation for security and international cooperation in the field of security";
- 2013: "Intelligence" magazine prize awarded for "outstanding contributions to the development of security awareness"
- 2013: Excellence Award of the National Defense College Foundation;
- 2014: award of the Civic Excellence Gala "among people", sponsored by the Romanian Academy, in the field of "diplomacy and security policy".

== Published works ==
=== Books ===
- Despre inteligență (On intelligence), 2014
- Spion pentru eternitate. Frank Wisner (Spy for eternity. Frank Wisner), 2014
- Incertitudine. Gândire strategică și relații internaționale în secolul XXI (Uncertainty. Strategic thinking and international relations in the 21st century), second edition, RAO Publishing, Bucharest, 2014;
- coordinator Spionii – cine sunt, ce fac? (Spies - who are they, what do they do?), RAO Publishing, Bucharest, 2013;
- coordinator Ars Analytica – provocări și tendințe în analiza de inteligenţă (Ars Analytica - challenges and tendencies in intelligence analysis), RAO Publishing, Bucharest, 2013;
- Noul Aliat – regândirea politicii de apărare a României la începutul secolului XXI, (The New Ally – rethinking Romania's defense policy at the beginning of the 21st century), (second edition, revised and updated), RAO Publishing, Bucharest, 2012;
- co-editor Cunoaștere strategică în zona extinsă a Mării Negre (Strategic Knowledge in the Wider Black Sea Area), RAO Publishing, Bucharest, 2011;
- coordinator Un Război al Minții – Inteligență, servicii de informații și cunoaștere strategică în secolul XXI (A mind war - Intelligence, Secret Services and Strategic Knowledge in the 21st Century), RAO Publishing, Bucharest, 2010;
- Incertitudine – Gândire strategică și relații internaționale în secolul XXI (Uncertainty. Strategic thinking and international relations in the 21st century), RAO Publishing, Bucharest, 2009;
- Noul aliat - regândirea politicii de apărare a României la începuturile secolului XXI (The New Ally - rethinking Romania's defense policy at the beginning of the 21st century), (RAO Publishing, Bucharest, 2009)
- Co-author Intelligence and Human Rights in the Era of Global Terrorism, Stanford University Press; (re-edited), 2008;
- Transformarea politicii de apărare a României. Trei teme de reflecție strategică, Occasional Paper 5 (III). Bucharest: Institute for Political Defense Studies and Military History, 2004;
- România - o perspectivă asupra reformei interne și a integrării în NATO (Romania - a perspective on internal reform and NATO integration), published in Defense Policy Trends in the 21st Century, Center for Security Studies (CSS), Zurich, Switzerland, 2003;
- Defence Policy Developments: Old and New Missions for the Armed Forces in The European Officer and the Challenge of the New Missions, Institute of Social Sciences, Miklos Zrinyi National Defense Universitym Press, Budapest, 2002;
- editor Bridging the Gap in Civil-Military Relation: Democratization, Reform, and Security, Enciclopedica Publishing, Bucharest, 2002;
- Globalization of Civil-Military Relations: Democratisation, Reform and Security, Enciclopedica Publishing, Bucharest, 2002;
- Dunărea, securitatea și cooperarea europeană în secolul XXI (The Danube, security and European cooperation in the 21st century) (bilingual edition Romanian-English), Enciclopedica Publishing, Bucharest, 2002;
- Riscuri, provocări și oportunități în spațiul Mării Negre (Risks, challenges and opportunities in the Black Sea area) (edited in cooperation with J.F.Kennedy School of Government, Harvard University), Monitorul Oficial Publishing, Bucharest, 2002;
- Concepts of European public law, Enciclopedica Publishing, Bucharest, 1997.
