= Diocese of Caransebeș =

Romanian Orthodox diocese based in Caransebeș, Romania

Caraș-Severin County, the territory of the diocese, within Romania

The Diocese of Caransebeș (Romanian: Episcopia Caransebeșului) is a Romanian Orthodox diocese based in Caransebeș, Romania, in the historic region of the Banat, and covering Caraș-Severin County. Established by the 17th century, it was moved to present-day Serbia during the 18th century, before being restored in 1865. It was dissolved in 1949 and revived in its current form in 1994.

== History and description ==
=== Restoration and subsequent activity ===
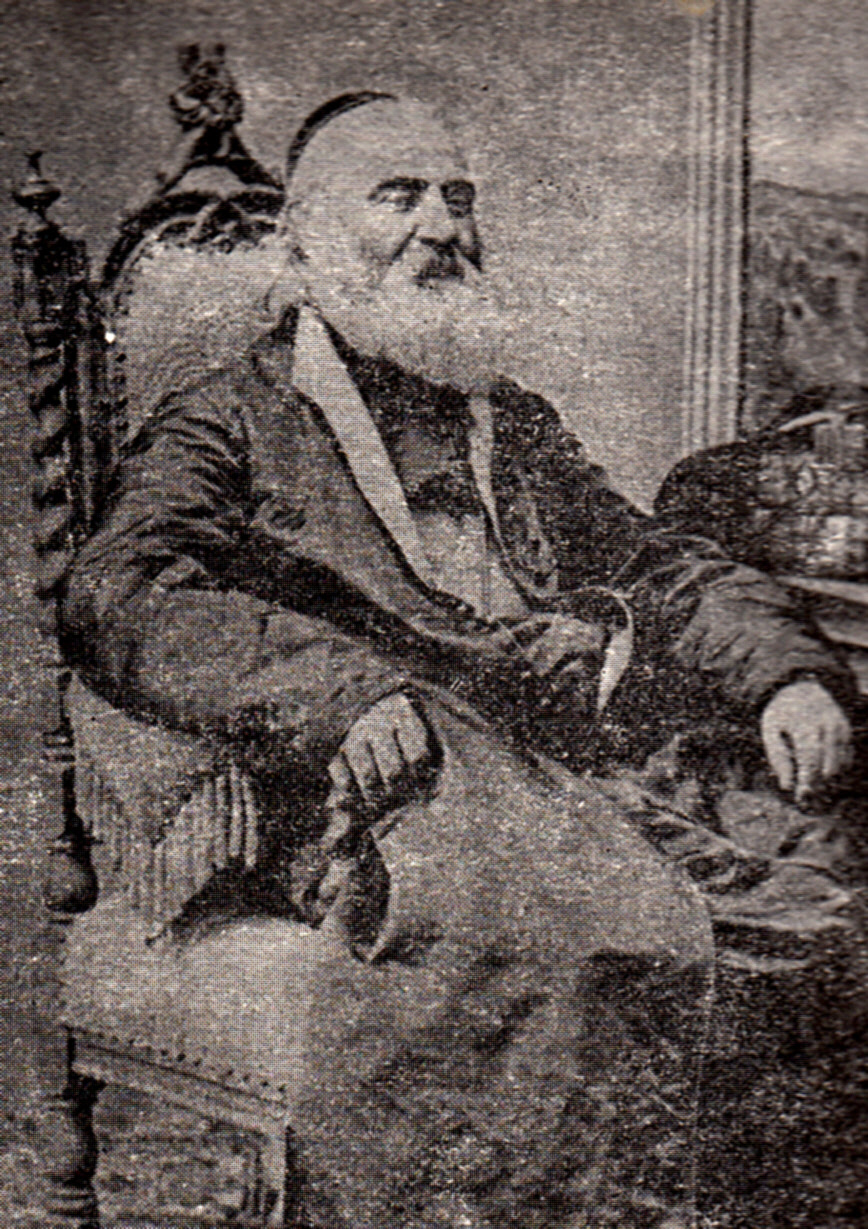
Ioan Popasu as bishop of Caransebeș

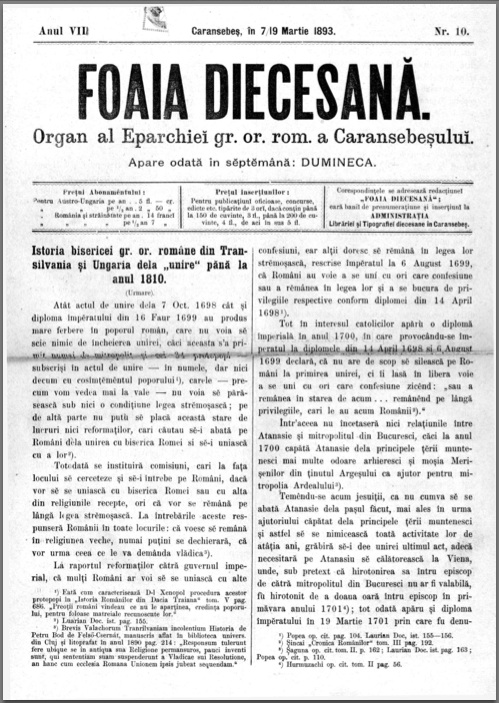
Foaia Diecezană, March 1893

Bishops are attested in Caransebeș at the end of the 17th century and into the 18th, some of them Serbs, others Romanian. The bishop's residence was moved to Vršac (Vârșeț) in 1775; the precise date is uncertain and other sources mention 1749. In the 1860s, under the Austrian Empire, the ethnic Romanians of Transylvania and Hungary were under the authority of the Serbian Patriarchate of Karlovci. A synod held in August–September 1864 decided on their separation. The Metropolis of Transylvania was to be centered at Sibiu and led by Andrei Șaguna. There were to be two suffragan dioceses, one at Arad and the other in Caransebeș, with the Serbian dioceses of Vršac and Timișoara remaining in place. The new Transylvanian synod named Ioan Popasu, archpriest at Braşov and one of Șaguna's closest associates going back to 1848, the first bishop of the revived Caransebeș Diocese in March 1865. He was named bishop by Emperor Franz Joseph I in July, consecrated bishop by Șaguna in August and installed in October.

The manner of the appointment, as well as the lack of a diocese of their own at Timișoara, angered some Romanians, as exemplified by an August 1865 newspaper article protesting that the people had not been allowed to choose their own bishop. However, the new diocese became a focal point of attention for the Romanian intelligentsia of the Banat, adopting as its mission the development of the cultural and spiritual well-being of Romanians living in the area. Whereas the early 18th century diocese had eight districts (Vârșeț, Palanca Nouă, Caransebeș, Mehadia and Lugoj in the Banat and three in Serbia proper), the new one had eleven: Caransebeș, Biserica Albă (Bela Crkva), Bocșa Montană, Buziaș, Ciacova, Făget, Mehadia, Oravița, Panciova (Pančevo), Lugoj and Vârșeț. A church census of 1868 found 332,272 members in 452 parishes. About two-thirds lived in civilian areas, with the largest district at Oravița, while the rest inhabited the Military Frontier, the largest district there being at Mehadia.

Popasu met with financial and administrative difficulties in the early years of his reign. For instance, in 1867, he complained to Șaguna that after the Romanians of Biserica Albă had separated from the Serbian parish, they were very poor after an 80-year campaign to introduce Romanian into the church and school, that the compensation from the Serbian community was only enough to buy a parcel of land, and that Șaguna should collect funds in his archdiocese for the building of a new church. The previous year, Șaguna received a letter from a group of believers informing him that several communes had gone over to the Romanian Greek-Catholic Church. This was reportedly due to the simony of the Serbian bishop at Vršac and because the Oravița archpriest was not respecting the fast, eating forbidden foods before the laity, and selling teaching positions. He was also notified that teachers and priests were altering liturgical words at will, replacing antiquated Slavic terms with more current Latin-based ones. While Șaguna supported the Latinizing trend, he also believed this should happen in an orderly fashion and with synodal approval, given that Romanian churches in Wallachia and Moldavia used the same texts and music. Eventually overcoming these issues, Popasu set up a theological institute, had a bishop's residence built, founded a publishing house and established the Foaia Diecezană ("Diocesan Leaflet") publication in 1886. In 1869, he also set up an association for teachers at Orthodox schools in the diocese, which for nearly half a century met at least twice a year for professional development and promotion of the Romanian language. Elected Metropolitan of Transylvania in 1874, he was denied recognition by the Emperor in Vienna and the government at Budapest, continuing at Caransebeș until his death in 1889.

He was succeeded by Nicolae Popea, vicar bishop at Sibiu, who continued his predecessor's work on the institute (for which he erected a new building), the press and the diocese's material well-being. He took care of the religious schools in his see, leaving his entire estate to scholarships for poor students. Following his death in 1908, two bishops were elected in his stead, both denied recognition by the authorities; the third, Miron Cristea, was accepted in 1910. He undertook a committed cultural activity until leaving in 1919, following the union of Transylvania with Romania, to become Metropolitan of Ungro-Wallachia. Diocesan adviser Iosif Badescu followed from 1920 until his death in 1933, when the archpriest Vasile Lăzărescu took over, serving until 1940, when he left to head the new Timișoara Diocese. Veniamin Nistor came next, paying special attention to publishing activity and the new magazine Altarul Banatului ("Altar of the Banat").

=== Dissolution and current incarnation ===
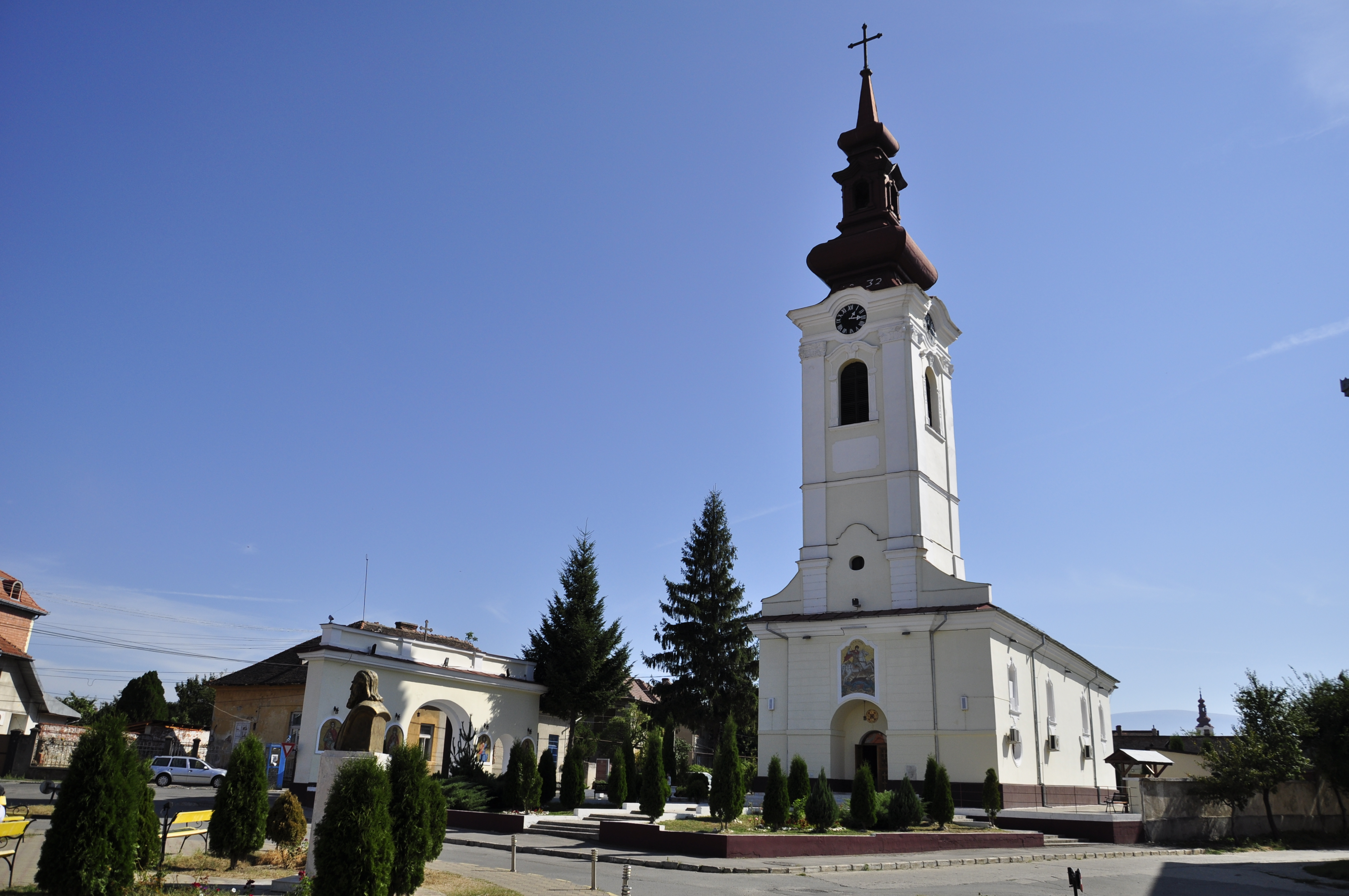
Cathedral of Saint George

In February 1949, the new Communist regime dissolved the diocese, incorporating it into the Timișoara Archiocese; Nistor lived out his days at the Coronation Cathedral in Alba Iulia. The diocese was revived in 1994, several years after the fall of the regime, the first bishop being Emilian Birdaș, previously vicar bishop at Arad and bishop of Alba Iulia. He started work on a new cathedral and began publishing Foaia Diecezană and Calendarul Românului ("The Romanian's Calendar") again. He died in 1996 and was succeeded by Laurențiu Streza, who in 2005 went on to become Metropolitan of Transylvania. Lucian Mic, formerly vicar bishop of Timișoara, has led the diocese since 2006.

The diocese encompasses Caraș-Severin County and is divided into four districts: Caransebeș (68 parishes), Reșița (50 parishes), Oravița (56 parishes) and Băile Herculane (38 parishes). It undertakes activities of a cultural nature that include a printing press, regular publications, religious education in schools, ministries to hospitals and prisons, a library and an archive, as well as charity works. It runs a high school-level theological seminary that has its roots as the Romanian section of the Vršac seminary, founded in 1822 and moved to Caransebeș in 1865, as well as overseeing the theology faculty of Eftimie Murgu University in Reșița. There are over a dozen monasteries and sketes in the diocese. At Romania's 2011 census, 226,230 residents of Caraș-Severin County stated they were Orthodox, representing 83.3% of the county's population among respondents for whom data were available. The diocesan see was formerly the 18th-century Cathedral of Saint George, replaced when the Cathedral of the Resurrection was inaugurated in 2010.
