= Ioan Ploscaru =

Romanian bishop

- Eparch of Lugoj
- Church: Romanian Greek Catholic Church
- Diocese: Eparchy of Lugoj
- In office: 14 March 1990 – 20 November 1995
- Predecessor: Ioan Bălan
- Successor: Alexandru Mesian
- Previous posts: Titular Eparch of Trapezopolis (1948-1990); Auxiliary Eparch of Lugoj (1948-1990)

Orders
- Ordination: 17 September 1933 by Valeriu Traian Frențiu
- Consecration: 30 November 1948 by Gerald O'Hara

Personal details
- Born: 19 November 1911 Frata, Kolozs County, Kingdom of Hungary, Transleithania, Austria-Hungary
- Died: 31 July 1998 (aged 86) Lugoj, Timiș County, Romania

Ioan Ploscaru (19 November 1911 – 31 July 1998) was a Romanian bishop of the Greek-Catholic Church.

Born into a peasant family in Frata commune, Cluj County, he studied in Blaj. He was ordained a priest in 1933 and a bishop in November 1948. The latter ordainment was performed in secret by bishop Gerald O'Hara, shortly after the new Communist regime outlawed the church and arrested his predecessor, Ioan Bălan. Himself arrested in August 1949, Ploscaru spent a number of years in detention, including at the notorious Sighet Prison.

After the collapse of the regime in 1989 and the church's legalization, he was the first Greek-Catholic bishop to officiate at a mass. This took place in January 1990, with the Romanian Orthodox Banat Metropolitan Nicolae Corneanu quickly agreeing to restore the Greek-Catholic churches in his province to their former owners. Ploscaru retired in 1996 and died two years later in Lugoj.
