= Augustin Buzura =

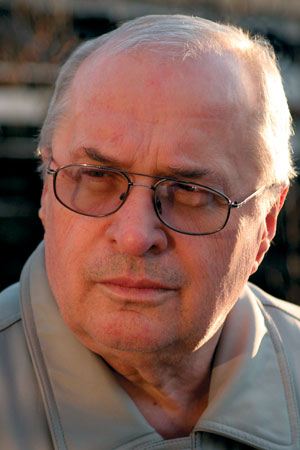
- Buzura in 2011
- Born: September 22, 1938; Copalnic-Mănăștur, Maramureș County, Kingdom of Romania
- Died: July 10, 2017 (aged 78); Bucharest, Romania
- Resting place: Bellu Cemetery, Bucharest
- Education: Gheorghe Șincai National College
- Alma mater: Iuliu Hațieganu University of Medicine and Pharmacy
- Occupation: Writer
- Children: Anamaria
- Writing career
- Language: Romanian
- Period: 1963–2009
- Notable work: Orgolii
- Notable awards: National Order of Merit (Romania), Grand Cross rank Order of Rio Branco, Commander rank

Augustin Buzura (Romanian pronunciation: [awɡusˈtin buˈzura]; September 22, 1938 – July 10, 2017) was a Romanian novelist and short story writer, also known as a journalist, essayist, and literary critic. A member of the Romanian Academy, he has been the president of the Romanian Cultural Foundation since 1990 and president of the Romanian Cultural Institute between 2003 and 2004.

== Biography ==
Born in Berința village, Copalnic-Mănăștur commune, Maramureș County, Buzura graduated from the Gheorghe Șincai National College in Baia Mare and attended the Faculty of Medicine and Pharmacy in Cluj (1958–1964), specialising in psychiatry. He debuted as a journalist with articles published by the magazine Tribuna during 1960.

Buzura's first published work was the 1963 collection of short stories, Capul Bunei Speranțe ("Cape of Good Hope"). He continued to publish regularly after that date, receiving critical acclaim and being awarded the Romanian Writers' Union prize three times, for the successive works Absenții ("The Absentees"), Fețele tăcerii ("The Faces of Silence"), and Vocile nopții ("The Voices in the Night"). His best known novel is the best-selling Orgolii (1977), which tells the story of surgeon Ion Cristian, a victim of the corruption of the medical system. The novel was adapted to the screen in 1982, from a scenario written by Buzura himself; the homonymous movie, directed by Manole Marcus, featured Victor Rebengiuc in Cristian's role.

He was elected corresponding member of the Romanian Academy in 1990 and became a full member in 1992. He was awarded the Order of Cultural Merit, 3rd class (1971), the National Order of Merit, Grand Cross rank (2000), and the Brazilian Order of Rio Branco, Commander rank. His daughter, Anamaria, married politician and diplomat George Maior. Buzura died in Bucharest at age 78 and was buried with military honours in the city's Bellu Cemetery.

== Works ==
- Capul Bunei Speranțe [Cape of Good Hope]. București: Editura Pentru Literaturǎ. 1963. OCLC 659954920.
- De ce zboară vulturii [Why Do Eagles Fly]. București: Editura Tineretului. 1965. OCLC 935387785.
- Absenții [The Unpresents]. Cluj: Dacia. 1970. OCLC 935415417.
- Orgolii [Prides]. Cluj-Napoca: Dacia. 1977. OCLC 935338561.
- Fețele tăcerii [Silence's Faces]. 1974.
- Vocile nopții [Night's Voices]. 1980.
- Bloc-notes [Block-notes]. Cluj-Napoca: Dacia. 1981. OCLC 255081323.
- Refugii [Refuges]. 1984.
- Drumul cenușii [Cinder's Road]. București: Cartea Românească. 1988. OCLC 935562064.
- Recviem pentru nebuni și bestii [Requiem for the Crazy and the Beasts]. București: Univers. 1999. OCLC 895667977.
- Raport asupra singurătății [Report on Solitude]. 2009.
