= Adrian Ghenie =

Romanian painter

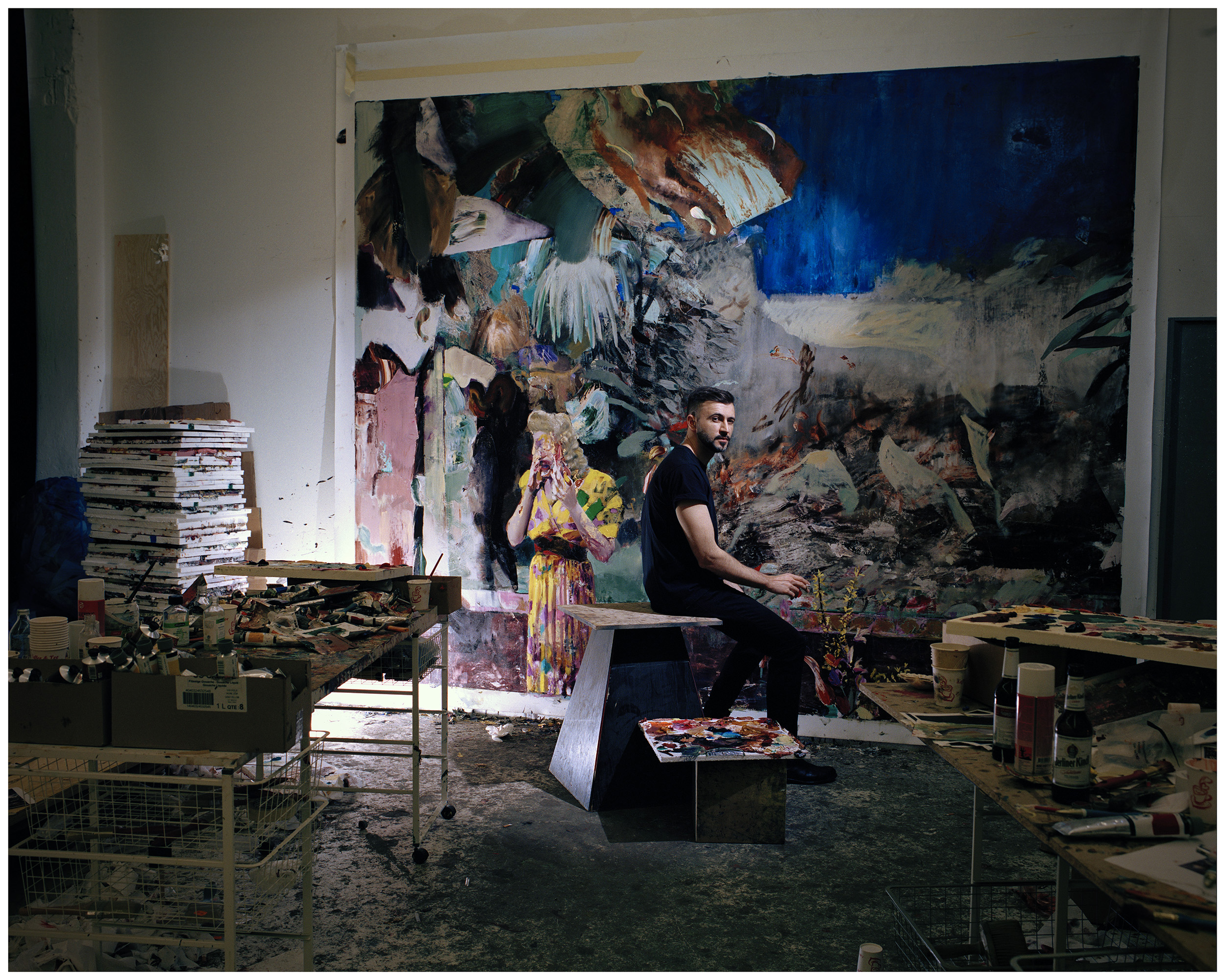
- Portrait of Adrian Ghenie by Oliver Mark, Berlin 2014, Collection of the Bukovina Museum
- Born: 13 August 1977 (age 49); Baia Mare, Socialist Republic of Romania
- Known for: Painting

Adrian Ghenie (Romanian pronunciation: [adriˈan ˈɡeni.e]; born 13 August 1977 in Baia Mare) is a contemporary Romanian painter, who lives and works in Berlin, Germany. His paintings range from detailed scenes that include his family and personal experiences to portraying historical figures or stories.

== Family ==
Ghenie's father was a dental surgeon and his mother practiced as a dental nurse. Ghenie would later feature dentistry imagery in some of his work. As an atheist, his father fell into a depressive state, which caused Ghenie to want to become a priest. He was turned away because his reasoning seemed less genuine and more because he had no direction to turn to. His brother, Wittgenstein, was rejected three times to become a priest and later became a plumber. His grandmother was Tartar Russian. Through the civil war, her mother, father, and eleven siblings passed away. The stories she told Ghenie would inspire and intrigue him.

== Early life and education ==
He attended the Gheorghe Șincai High School and then studied fine arts at the Arts and Crafts School in Baia Mare between 1991 and 1994. Ghenie self taught from Sibiu museum originals that detailed the technicalities of how each period would paint on different materials.

He is a graduate of the Art and Design University of Cluj-Napoca (2001). His professors at The Academy taught him abstract ideas inspired by the Americans. He attempted to recreate other pieces of work because it would help him understand how another artist created something and what techniques they may have used to achieve a certain look. During the 1990s, Ghenie was very poor and resorted to creating low skilled work for clients and occasionally hotel lobbies.

His work has humor mixed with a darker, deeper meaning from the visual. He has often said that it is impossible for an artist to craft their own unique, true to them style, since they are always influenced by their time period and the trends or politics of that. He mixes classical techniques with abstract elements.

After graduating the Academy in 2001, Ghenie was interested in traveling West to expand his career.

== Career ==
Ghenie lives and works in Cluj, Berlin, and London. In 2005, he co-founded Galeria Plan B in Cluj, together with Mihai Pop, a production and exhibition space for contemporary art. In 2008 Plan B opened a permanent exhibition space in Berlin.

His work has been widely exhibited in group and solo exhibitions, including at Tate Liverpool, San Francisco Museum of Modern Art and Fondazione Palazzo Strozzi in Florence.

In June 2014 the oil on canvas painting "The Fake Rothko" was sold for £1,426,000 ($2,428,140).

In 2015, Ghenie was shown in the 56th Venice Biennale.

In February 2016, the large oil on canvas painting "The Sunflowers of 1937" inspired by Vincent van Gogh's famous "Sunflowers" was sold in London for £3,177,000 at a Sotheby's auction, marking it the most expensive painting sold by the Romanian artist.

Before the auction, the value of the painting was estimated between £400,000 and £600,000. It belonged to the Galerie Judin of Berlin, who had purchased it from the artist. Ranging from France, United States, Germany, and to Italy, Ghenie has been apart of huge solo and group exhibitions.

== Collections ==
Ghenie's work is represented in numerous major museum and public collections including the Centre Georges Pompidou, the Hammer Museum, Los Angeles, the Museum of Contemporary Art, Los Angeles, the Museum of Modern Art, Antwerp, San Francisco Museum of Modern Art, and Stedelijk Museum voor Actuele Kunst, Ghent.

== Style and technique ==
Ghenie does not use traditional tools of the painter or brushes, but a palette knife and stencils. He paints portraits of 20th century figures, particularly those associated with genocide and mass suffering, that appear in his work gnawed and slashed, blurred and speckled.

His style is collage-like and creates memorable impastos. He meticulously chooses materials of high contrast and bright colors to give the works a sense of movement. Ghenie creates his paintings with many layers to show the complexity of his work to challenge the viewer. He wants them to see a variety of different images, from what they initial looked at in his work, the longer they more thoughtfully they view the piece. The focus of his work is on the act of painting instead of the final product.

His painterly style has been compared to that of Francis Bacon.
