= Călin Ioan Bot =

Romanian Greek Catholic hierarch

- Bishop of Lugoj
- Church: Romanian Greek Catholic Church
- Appointed: 16 June 2023
- Predecessor: Alexandru Mesian
- Successor: Incumbent
- Other posts: Titular Bishop of Abrittum, Auxiliary Bishop of Romanian Catholic Eparchy of Lugoj (2020–2023)
- Previous post: Rector of the Greek-Catholic Theological Institute St. John the Evangelist in Cluj-Napoca (2000–2002, 2005–2017)

Orders
- Ordination: 10 September 1995 (Priest) by Vasile Hossu
- Consecration: 21 June 2020 (Bishop) by Lucian Mureșan

Personal details
- Born: Călin Ioan Bot; 24 July 1970 (age 55) Surduc, Sălaj County, Romania
- Coat of arms

Bishop Călin Ioan Bot (born 24 July 1970) is a Romanian Greek Catholic hierarch, who has served as an Eparchial Bishop of the Romanian Catholic Eparchy of Lugoj since 16 June 2023. Previously he was the Titular Bishop of Abrittum and an Auxiliary Bishop of Eparchy of Lugoj since 22 January 2020 until 16 June 2023.

== Life ==
Bishop Bot was born in Surduc, and joined the Greek-Catholic Theological Institute St. John the Evangelist in Cluj-Napoca (1991–1995). During this time he was ordained as a priest on 10 September 1995 for the Romanian Catholic Eparchy of Cluj-Gherla. From 1995 until 2000 he served as an educational director, and subsequently – rector of the Greek-Catholic Theological Institute St. John the Evangelist (2000–2002 and 2005–2017). And in the mid time, during 2002–2005, he studied in Rome, Italy: a one year in the formation course for the seminary formators at the Pontifical Gregorian University and other two years at the same university in the Institute of Spirituality (master's degree).

In 2017 he was appointed protosyncellus of the Eparchy of Cluj-Gherla and in addition to the spiritual direction and didactic activities at the Inochentie Micu Seminary Lyceum in Cluj-Napoca, he was an eparchial adviser on education-formative issues of his native eparchy.

On 22 January 2020, he was confirmed by the Pope Francis as an Auxiliary Bishop of the Romanian Catholic Eparchy of Lugoj and Titular Bishop of Abrittum. On 21 June 2020, he was consecrated as bishop by Major Archbishop Cardinal Lucian Mureșan and other hierarchs of the Romanian Greek Catholic Church at the Cathedral of the Holy Trinity in Blaj.

On 16 March 2023 Bishop Bot was appointed as an Archiepiscopal Administrator of the vacant Romanian Catholic Eparchy of Lugoj, after the death of Bishop Alexandru Mesian and on 16 June 2023 become the Eparchial bishop of the same Eparchy.

Catholic Church titles
Preceded by Ján Eugen Kočiš	Titular Bishop of Abrittum; 2020–2023	Succeeded by Petro Holiney
Preceded by Alexandru Mesian	Eparchial Bishop of Romanian Catholic Eparchy of Lugoj; 2023–present	Incumbent
