= Cosmin Vancea =

Romanian footballer

Personal information
- Full name: Cosmin Grigore Vancea
- Date of birth: 24 December 1984 (age 41)
- Place of birth: Șăulia, Romania
- Height: 1.87 m (6 ft 2 in)
- Position: Forward

Youth career
- Olimpia Târgu Mureș
- LPS Târgu Mureș
- 1996–2003: ASA Târgu Mureș

Senior career*
Years	Team	Apps	(Gls)
2003–2005	ASA Târgu Mureș	41	(22)
2005–2007	Mobila Sovata	43	(19)
2007–2008	Gaz Metan Mediaș	13	(3)
2008–2011	Târgu Mureș	74	(21)
2011	Bintang Medan	18	(10)
2011–2013	Turnu Severin	39	(9)
2013	Oțelul Galați	9	(1)
2013	Saipa	1	(0)
2013–2014	CSMS Iași	2	(1)
Total		240	(86)
- * Club domestic league appearances and goals as of 30 December 2018

Cosmin Grigore Vancea (born 24 December 1984) is a Romanian former footballer who played as a forward for teams such as: ASA 1962 Târgu Mureș, Gaz Metan Mediaș, ASA 2013 Târgu Mureș, CS Turnu Severin or Bintang Medan, among others.
