= Cathedral of the Descent of the Holy Spirit, Lugoj =

Cathedral of the Descent of the Holy Spirit
- Catedrala Greco-Catolică Coborârea Spiritului Sfânt
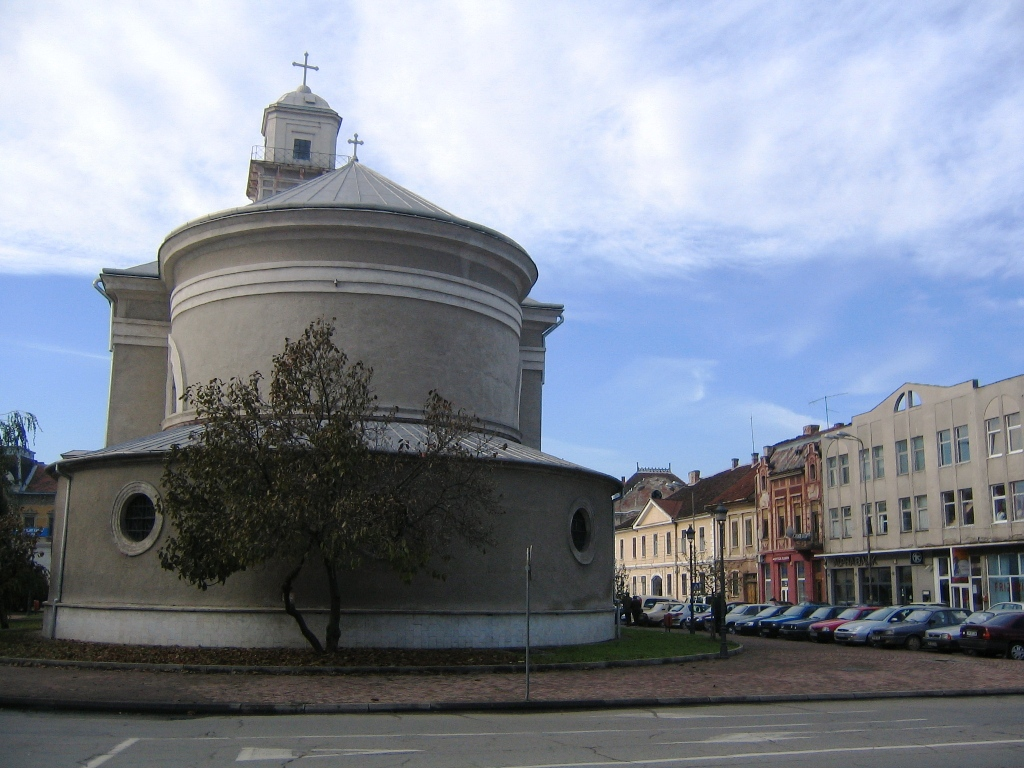
- Cathedral of the Descent of the Holy Spirit
- 45.68502°N 21.90578°E
- Location: Lugoj
- Country: Romania
- Denomination: Catholic Church || Romanian Greek Catholic Church || Byzantine Rite

The Cathedral of the Descent of the Holy Spirit (Romanian: Catedrala Greco-Catolică Coborârea Spiritului Sfânt) also called Greek Catholic Cathedral of the Descent of the Holy Spirit is the name given to a Catholic religious building of the Romanian or Byzantine rite that serves as the seat of the Eparchy of Lugoj (Eparchia Lugosiensis or Eparhia Lugoj) which was created in 1853 with the Bull "Apostolicum ministerium" of Pope Pius IX is located in Lugoj, originally in the Austrian Empire and now in Romania.

The building was built between 1843 and 1854 in neoclassical style by architect L. Oettinger. The cathedral was occupied by force by members of the Romanian Orthodox Church during the Communist period from 1948 to 1990 and returned to Catholic hands on 21 January 1990 by decision of the Orthodox Metropolitan Nicolae Corneanu, the first Greek Catholic cathedral returned to its original owners in the country.

== See also ==
- Roman Catholicism in Romania
- Holy Spirit Cathedral
- List of cathedrals in Romania
