= Romanian Catholic Eparchy of Lugoj =

Eastern Catholic eparchy in Romania

Coordinates: 45.6850°N 21.9054°E

Eparchy of Lugoj Dioecesis Lugosiensis Eparhia de Lugoj

Location
- Country: Romania
- Ecclesiastical province: Făgăraş and Alba Iulia
- Metropolitan: Major Archeparchy of Făgăraş and Alba Iulia

Statistics
- Area: 32,710 km^{2} (12,630 sq mi)
- Population: (as of 2013); 101,000

Information
- Denomination: Catholic Church
- Sui iuris church: Romanian Greek Catholic Church
- Rite: Byzantine
- Established: 26 November 1853
- Cathedral: Cathedral of the Descent of the Holy Spirit

Current leadership
- Pope: Leo XIV
- Major Archbishop: Sede Vacante
- Bishop: Călin Ioan Bot

Map
- Church administrative divisions

The Eparchy of Lugoj is an eparchy (equivalent to a diocese in the Latin Church) of the Romanian Greek Catholic Church which is an Eastern Catholic particular church of the Catholic Church that is in full communion with the Holy See. Its uses the Byzantine Rite in the Romanian language in its liturgical services. It was founded in 1853. It is a suffragan diocese of the Major Archeparchy of Făgăraș and Alba Iulia. The eparchy's cathedral church is the Cathedral of the Descent of the Holy Spirit which is situated in the city of Lugoj, Romania. The incumbent eparch is Călin Ioan Bot.

== List of Eparchs ==
- Alexandru Dobra (16 Nov 1854 – 13 Apr 1870)
- Ioan Olteanu (29 Nov 1870 – 22 Dec 1873)
- Victor Mihaly de Apșa (21 Dec 1874 – 18 Mar 1895)
- Dumitru Radu (3 Dec 1896 – 25 Jun 1903)
- Vasile Hossu (25 Jun 1903 – 16 Dec 1911)
- Valeriu Traian Frențiu (14 Dec 1912 – 25 Feb 1922)
- Alexandru Nicolescu (25 Feb 1922 – 29 Aug 1936)
- Ioan Bălan (29 Aug 1936 – 4 Aug 1959)
- Ioan Ploscaru (14 Mar 1990 – 30 Nov 1995)
- Alexandru Mesian, coadjutor (20 Jul 1994 – 30 Nov 1995)
- Alexandru Mesian (30 Nov 1995 – 11 Mar 2023)
- Călin Ioan Bot, Auxiliary Bishop, Archiepiscopal Administrator (16 Mar 2023 - 15 Jun 2023)
- Călin Ioan Bot (15 Jun 2023 - )
