= Saint John the New Monastery =

Monastery in Suceava, Romania

Coordinates: 47.6419011°N 26.2626652°E

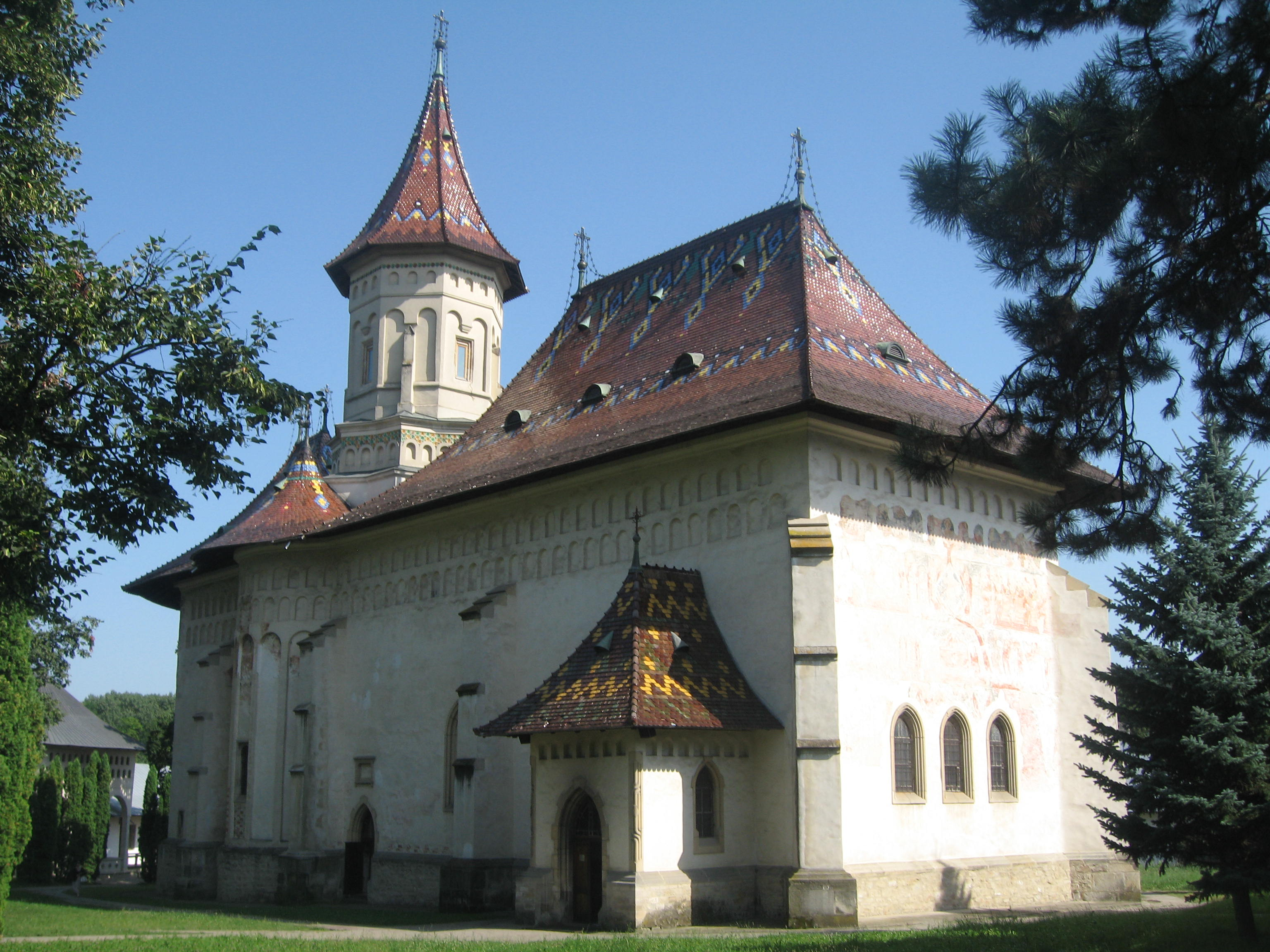
The monastery church, dedicated to Saint George

Saint John the New Monastery (Romanian: Mănăstirea Sfântul Ioan cel Nou) is a Romanian Orthodox monastery in Suceava, Romania. Built between 1514 and 1522, the monastery church is one of eight buildings that make up the churches of Moldavia UNESCO World Heritage Site, and is also listed as a historic monument by the country's Ministry of Culture and Religious Affairs. Its construction began during the reign of voivode Bogdan III the One-Eyed of Moldavia, after the nearby Mirăuți Church (the metropolitan cathedral of Moldavia at that moment) was devastated in 1513. The construction was completed by Stephen IV of Moldavia (also known as Ștefăniță). The monastery church served as metropolitan cathedral of Moldavia until 1677 and, since 1991, it serves as the cathedral of the Archdiocese of Suceava and Rădăuți. The church is dedicated to Saint George and it has frescoes painted on the outside, typical of the region.

The monastery is dedicated to Saint John the New of Suceava, a Moldavian monk who preached during Turkish occupation and was subsequently martyred in Cetatea Albă, present-day Bilhorod-Dnistrovskyi in Ukraine. Alexander I of Moldavia brought his relics to Suceava in 1402. Besides the monumental church, the monastery complex includes a bell tower built in 1589 during the reign of Peter the Lame of Moldavia, a chapel founded by clergyman Anastasie Crimca in 1626–1629, old cells for monks (built in the 19th century), a house for the abbot (built between 1894 and 1896) and the surrounding walls.

== See also ==
- Cathedral of the Nativity, Suceava
