= St. George's Church, Caransebeș =

Heritage site in Caraș-Severin County, Romania

Coordinates: 45°24′37″N 22°13′20″E

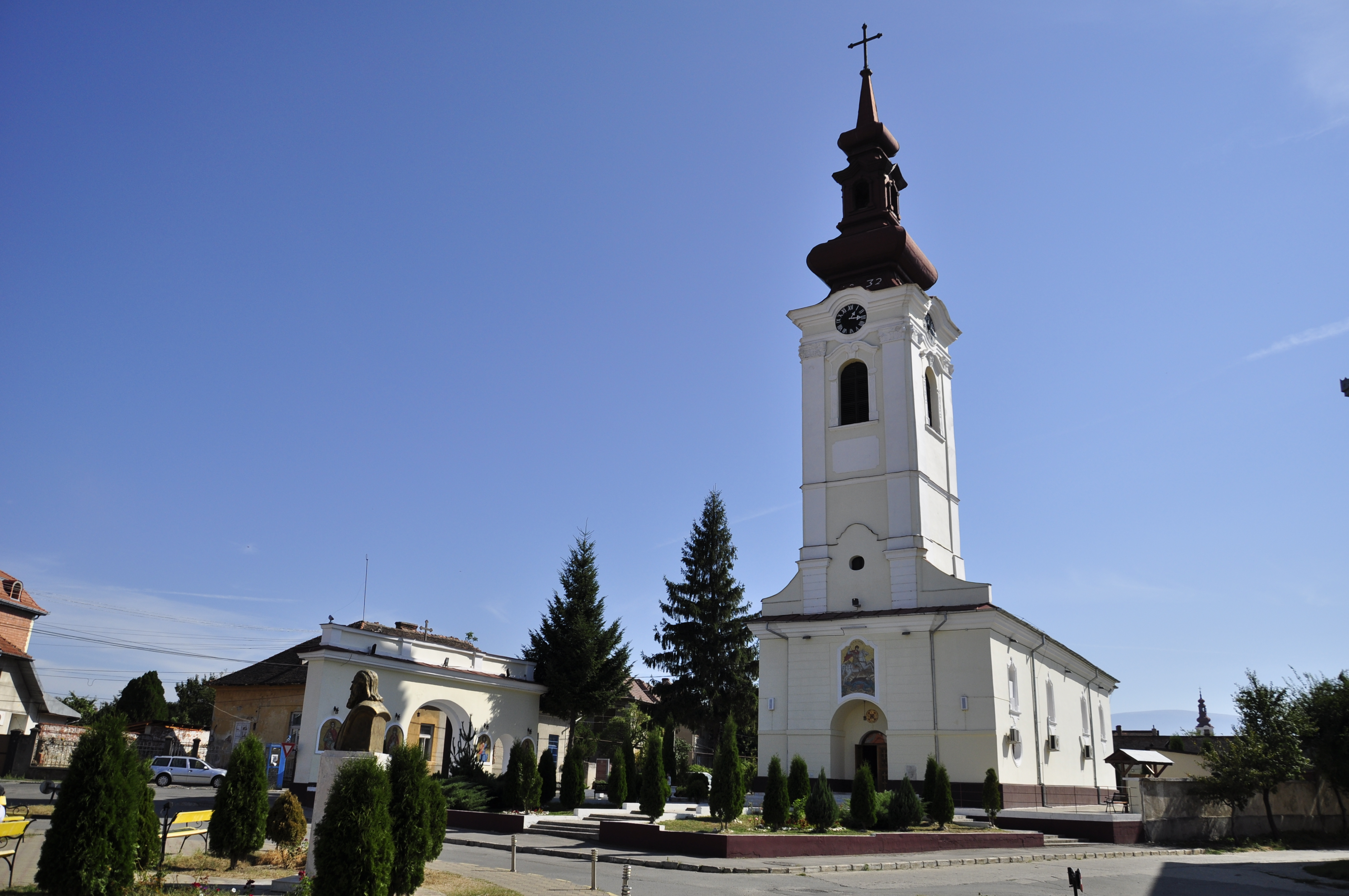
St. George's Church

St. George's Church (Romanian: Biserica Sfântul Gheorghe) is a Romanian Orthodox church located at 2 Piața Sf. Gheorghe, Caransebeș, Romania. It is dedicated to Saint George.

The church was originally founded as a wooden structure in 1444. Over time, it served as a monastery, as the city’s first library and as a deacons’ school. Its rebuilding as a stone and brick structure began in 1725 and was completed by 1757. A commemorative altar stone inscribed in Slavonic dates to 1759, and probably marks the completion of the interior decoration.

The church suffered damage during the Austro-Turkish War of 1788–1791, subsequently undergoing repairs and a new consecration in 1796. Additional repairs took place between 2000 and 2008.

The church interior was painted in four stages by different artists between 1757 and 1862, in part necessitated by war damage. The latest restoration took place in 1984-1985. The iconostasis, painted in Baroque style, dates to 1863. The icons were done in 1863-1864 by a Viennese Academic painter.

In 1865, the church became the cathedral of the Diocese of Caransebeș. It served as such until 2010, when a new cathedral opened. The church is listed as a historic monument by Romania's Ministry of Culture and Religious Affairs.
