= Assumption of Mary Cathedral, Baia Mare =

Coordinates: 47.6617°N 23.5882°E

Assumption of Mary Cathedral
- Catedrala Adormirea Maicii Domnului din Baia Mare
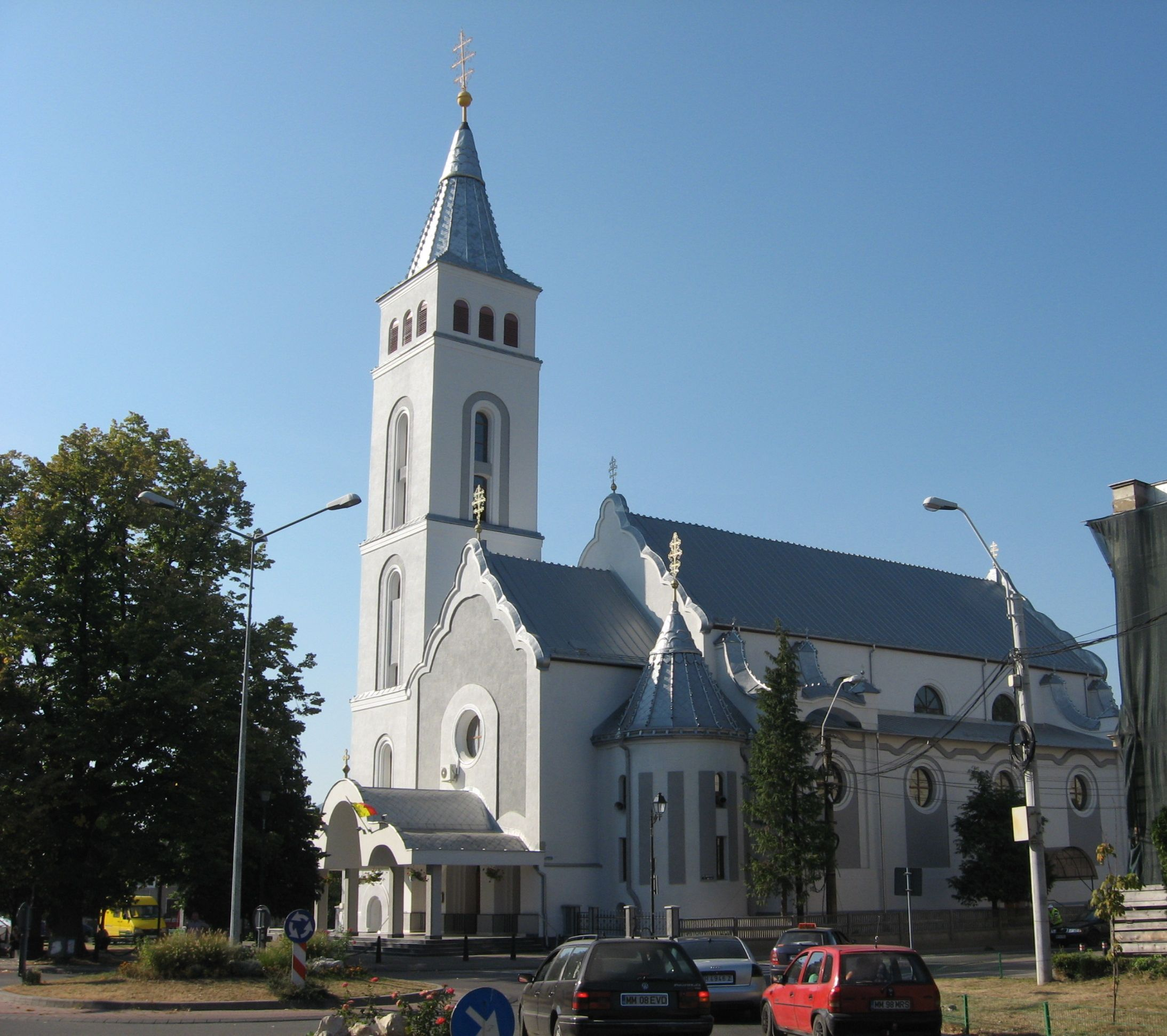
- Assumption of Mary Cathedral
- Location: Baia Mare
- Country: Romania
- Denomination: Romanian Orthodox Church (disputed by catholic church)

The Assumption of Mary Cathedral (Romanian: Catedrala Adormirea Maicii Domnului din Baia Mare, Catedrala Sfânta Maria) is a Romanian Orthodox church in Baia Mare, Romania.

The cornerstone was laid in 1905, the building completed in 1911. In 1930, the church became the cathedral of the new Romanian Catholic Diocese of Maramureș. When the Greek-Catholic Church was outlawed by the communist regime in 1948, the cathedral became a Romanian Orthodox parish. It continues to be used as such, which has led to legal disputes.
