= Șăulia =

- Commune
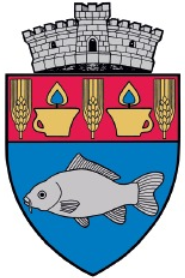
- Coat of arms

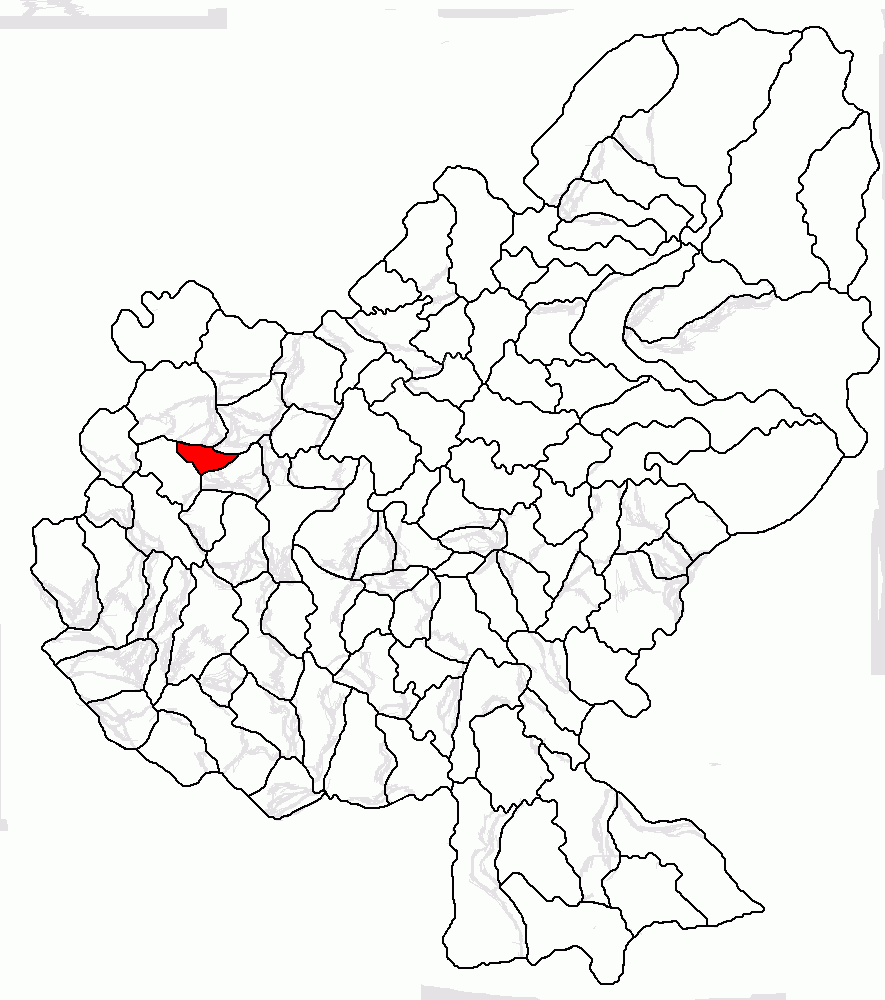
- Location in Mureș County

- Location in Romania
- Coordinates: 46°38′N 24°13′E
- Country: Romania
- County: Mureș

Government
  - Mayor (2024–2028): Dorel Grigore Vancea (PSD)
- Area: 26.25 km^{2} (10.14 sq mi)
- Elevation: 353 m (1,158 ft)
- Population (2021-12-01): 1,892
  - Density: 72/km^{2} (190/sq mi)
- Time zone: EET/EEST (UTC+2/+3)
- Postal code: 547590
- Area code: (+40) 0265
- Vehicle reg.: MS
- Website: saulia.ro

Șăulia (Hungarian: Mezősályi, Hungarian pronunciation: [ˈmɛzøːʃaːji]) is a commune in Mureș County, Transylvania, Romania that is composed of four villages: Leorința-Șăulia (Lőrincidűlő), Măcicășești (Szteuniadülő), Pădurea (Erdőtanya), and Șăulia.

== Demographics ==
Historical population
Year	Pop.	±%
1850	1,122	—
1880	1,279	+14.0%
1900	1,461	+14.2%
1910	1,630	+11.6%
1920	1,890	+16.0%
1930	2,143	+13.4%
1956	2,888	+34.8%
1977	2,443	−15.4%
1992	2,003	−18.0%
2002	2,117	+5.7%
2011	2,018	−4.7%
2021	1,892	−6.2%
Source: Census data

At the 2002 census, Șăulia had a population of 2,117: 87% Romanians, 10% Roma, and 3% Hungarians. At the 2011 census, the commune had 2,018 inhabitants, of which 80.03% were Romanians, 16.3% Roma, and 1.39% Hungarians. At the 2021 census, Șăulia had a population of 1,892; of those, 81.24% were Romanians, 12.79% Roma, and 1.11% Hungarians.

== Natives ==
- Alexandru Rusu (1884–1963), bishop of the Greek-Catholic Church
- Cosmin Vancea (born 1984), footballer
