= Gheorghe Șincai National College (Baia Mare) =

- Colegiul Național Gheorghe Șincai
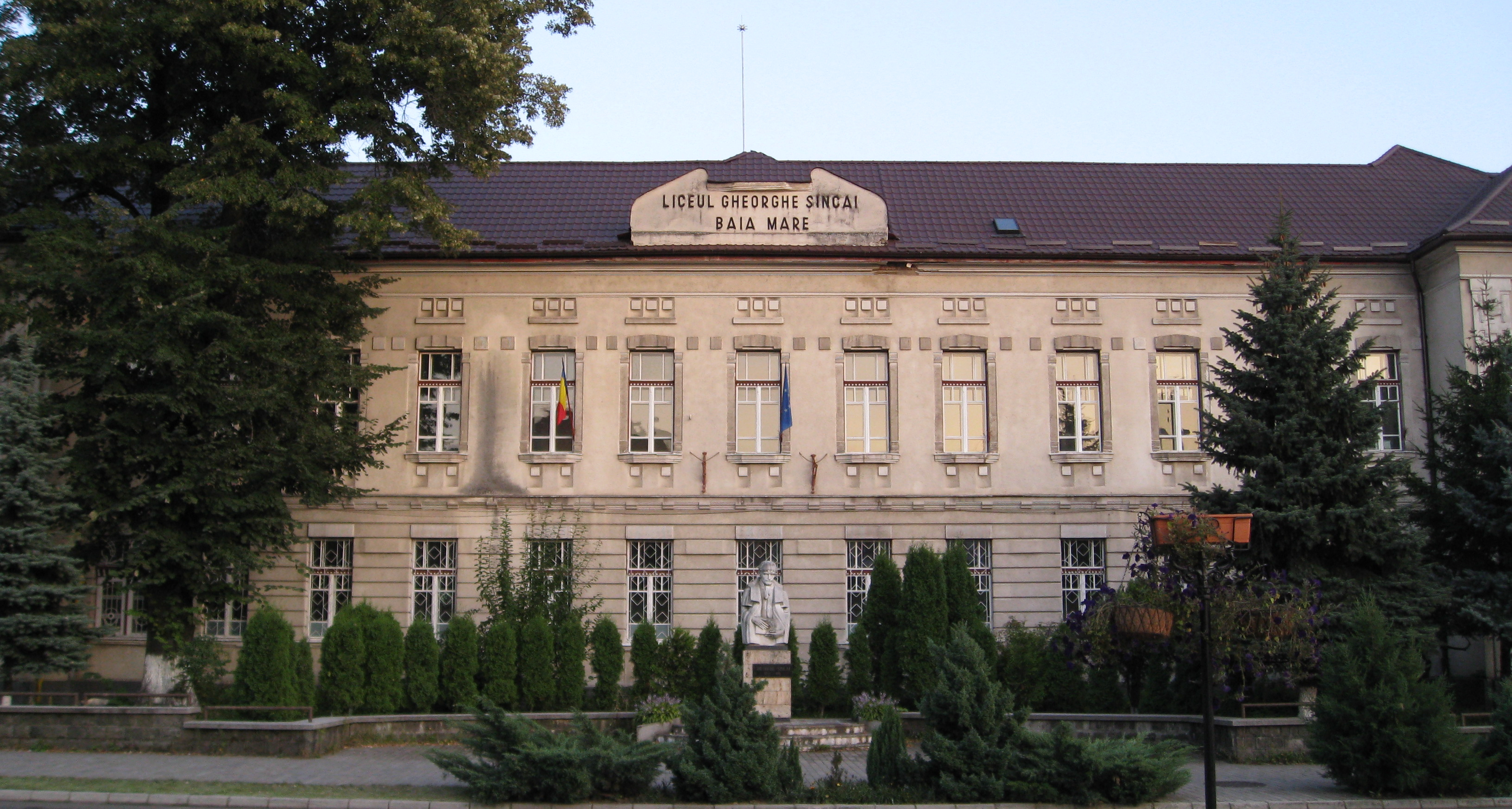

Location
- 25 Gheorghe Șincai Street, Baia Mare, Maramureș County; Romania; 47°39′28″N 23°34′39″E

Information
- Type: Public
- Established: 1919
- Principal: Leonard Mardar
- Grades: 5–12
- Enrollment: c. 900
- Campus: Urban
- Website: www.sincaibm.ro

Gheorghe Șincai National College (Romanian: Colegiul Național "Gheorghe Șincai") is a public day high school located at 25 Gheorghe Șincai Street, Baia Mare, Romania. It is a school for grades 9 to 12 attended by some 900 pupils aged 14 to 19; grades 5 to 8 opened in 2010. The school is named after historian, philologist and educator Gheorghe Șincai. It is one of three high schools in Baia Mare designated a "National College", the most prestigious rank for institutions of secondary education in Romania. It also ranks high on the national level in results at the Romanian Baccalaureate, university admissions, and school contests. Over 17,000 have graduated from Șincai, with the majority going on to university. In 2022, the high school ranked number 1 in Maramureș County in terms of Baccalaureate scores (99.5% graduation rate) and number 56 nationally.

== History ==
Șincai was founded on 12 July [O.S. 29 June] 1919, shortly after the Union of Transylvania with Romania. Its first head, appointed by the Directing Council of Transylvania, was Gheorghe Hetco, who remained in his position until 1940. When it opened, the high school had 172 students, 17 teachers, eight classrooms, a chemistry laboratory and a physics one. The library had 10,099 books. 561 pupils graduated during the interwar period. In 1940, the Second Vienna Award granted Northern Transylvania, including Baia Mare, to Hungary. The Romanian high school was closed and a Hungarian-language one functioned in its stead.

Gheorghe Șincai High School reopened on 1 December 1944, once it had passed back under Romanian control, although classes did not resume until January 1945, with the canon and catechist Vasile Țiplea being named director. In 1959, the school building was expanded with twenty new classrooms and a gym. Expansion continued in the 1970s, with the building eventually housing 44 classrooms, some of which were used as laboratories.

After World War II, the high school had one Romanian-language section and one in Hungarian, until a Hungarian high school was established in Baia Mare. In 1959, as part of a crackdown on Hungarian institutions in Romania, this again became a section of Șincai, a status maintained until 1998, when the Hungarian high school was re-established.

== Facilities ==
Șincai has 32 classrooms and 12 scientific and linguistic laboratories. The latter consist of three computer labs with 60 computers, three physics labs, two chemistry labs and one each for French, English and geography. The library has some 30,000 volumes and a reading room. The French, English, German and computer science departments have their own libraries. In addition, there are 11 teachers’ offices, a teachers’ room, five personnel offices, a gym, an outdoor athletic area, and a guidance counselor’s office. A psychologist and a doctor are on staff. Classes occur during the morning, with afternoons reserved for arts and sports.

Outside the computer labs, there are additional computers in the classrooms, along with teaching equipment that is constantly being updated (printers, copy machines, scanners, four video projectors, DVD players, televisions, tape recorders, microscopes, dissection kits, laboratory kits for physics, chemistry, and biology, etc.).

The original building was constructed between 1903 and 1906, and is classified as a historic monument by the Ministry of Culture and Religious Affairs. This, along with the 1959 addition, was refurbished in 2000-2007, and again in 2021-2023.

== Activities ==
Intramural sports championships take place at Șincai: the High School Championship, the 9th Grade Classes' Cup, the 12th Grade Classes' Cup; as well as participation in city, county and national sports championships.

The Gheorghe Șincai Cultural Society functioned from 1919 to 1940. In 1969 the magazine Speranțe ("Hopes") first appeared, on the occasion of the school's semicentennial. It was published, with interruptions, until 1994, after which faculty and students attempted to start other publications, none of which had more than one issue. From 1994, Șincai has been in a network of pilot schools experimenting with and applying elements of education reform.

Starting in 1958, Șincai began to appear among the schools with excellent performance at academic olympiads, a goal that continued to be met in the ensuing decades. As of 2008, pupils had won 679 prizes at national olympiads, 32 at international olympiads, and 13 at presentations of compositions. The school’s gymnastics, basketball and volleyball teams have won national championships, and numerous prizes at county and regional contests.

== Notable alumni ==
- Augustin Buzura (1938–2017), member of the Romanian Academy, president of the Romanian Cultural Foundation
- Vasile Gheorghe Coțofan (1934–2017), veterinarian and academic
- Ioan Dragomir (1905—1985), bishop of the Greek-Catholic Church
- Dezideriu Duma (1905–1988), member of the Academy of Medical Sciences
- Mircea Flonta (b. 1932), member of the Romanian Academy, professor at the University of Bucharest’s Faculty of Philosophy
- Adrian Ghenie (b. 1977), painter
- Vasile Gheție (1903–1990), titular member of the Romanian Academy, Doctor Honoris Causa of the University of Leipzig, member of the New York Academy of Sciences, member of the Royal Society of Medicine
- Ioan Groșan (b. 1954), writer
- Mircea Hrișcă (1938–2005), painter and graphic artist
- Alexandru Mesian (1937–2023), Greek-Catholic hierarch
- Lucian Mureșan (1931–2025), prelate of the Roman Greek Catholic Church and a cardinal of the Catholic Church
- Mihai Olos (1940–2015), conceptual artist, poet, and essayist
- Marius Porumb (b. 1943), corresponding member of the Romanian Academy
- Leon Prodan (1902–1984), professor of public health at Boston University School of Medicine
- Paula Seling (b. 1978), singer
- Ioan Șișeștean (1936–2011), prelate of the Greek Catholic Church and bishop of the Greek Catholic Diocese of Maramureș
- Florin Tătaru (b. 1967), politician
- Florian C. Ulmeanu (1903–1973), titular member of the Society of Biotypology in Paris, post-mortem member of the Academy of Medical Sciences
- Gheza Vida (1913–1980), sculptor
