= Ioan Dragomir =

Romanian bishop (1905–1985)

Ioan Dragomir (11 October 1905 – 25 April 1985) was a Romanian bishop of the Greek-Catholic Church.

Born into a peasant family in Ariniș, Maramureș County, he attended high school in Zalău and at the Gheorghe Șincai High School in Baia Mare. Dragomir then studied theology in Gherla, remaining there several years as a teacher. After his ordination, he was a parish priest from 1932 to 1934 in Coștiui, Hoteni, and Ocna Șugatag. He left to study theology at Strasbourg but returned early due to ill health. After recovering, Dragomir finished his studies in Rome, becoming a doctor of theology. He was named archpriest of Satu Mare and also canon at the Baia Mare Cathedral. Despite experiencing persecution, Dragomir led an active religious life during the period after Northern Transylvania was ceded to Hungary in 1940. Following the area's return to Romania in 1944, he helped reopen Romanian schools and set up curricula.

In 1948, the new Communist regime outlawed Dragomir's church and he spent time hidden in a barn attic in his native village. One night, dressed as a peasant, he went to the Ulmeni station and boarded a train for Bucharest, paying a villager who recognized him to keep quiet. Dragomir lived hidden at the nunciature and in 1950 was consecrated bishop by Gerald O'Hara, the Holy See's delegate in Romania. After relations with the Vatican were severed and the nunciature was closed, Dragomir was arrested by the Securitate, sentenced to prison in 1951, and subjected to various repressive measures. He was incarcerated at the notorious Sighet and Gherla prisons, being released in 1964. He returned to Ariniș, where he had been presumed dead, and resumed his duties. Near the end of his life, gravely ill and influenced by others, Dragomir consecrated three bishops on his own, without discussion with other bishops or Vatican approval. He died in Bucharest and was buried alongside his parents in Ariniș. The funeral took place during a period of comparatively relaxed persecution, and was attended by bishops Alexandru Todea, Ioan Cherteș, and Ioan Ploscaru.
