= Cathedral of the Nativity, Suceava =

Romanian Orthodox Church in Romania

Coordinates: 47.6470028°N 26.2493027°E

The Cathedral of the Nativity (Romanian: Catedrala ortodoxă Nașterea Domnului) is a Romanian Orthodox church in Suceava, Suceava County, Bukovina, Romania. It is located in Mărășești–Zamca district, near the city center, on a plateau on Zamca Hill, dominating the skyline of the city. The church is visible from many locations in Suceava and its surroundings. Although referred to as a cathedral due to its size, it functions as a parish church.

The structure was begun in 1991, at the private initiative of some local personalities, and completed in 2015, with the help of the local authorities. The cathedral was designed by architect Doru Ghiocel Olaș, who changed completely the initial sketches made by architect Constantin Gorcea. The structure is 70 meters long, 20 meters wide and 82 meters high, being one of the largest cathedrals in Romania. It is also one of the twelve tallest Orthodox church buildings in the world.

On 4 October 2015, the new religious edifice was consecrated and opened for public service. At the ceremony there participated 10,000 people, 60 clerics and some local politicians. The church is dedicated to the Nativity of Jesus and the Presentation of Mary.

== See also ==
- Saint John the New Monastery
