= Archbishop of Suceava =

List of Orthodox Archbishops of Suceava of the Romanian Patriarchate:

- Toader Arăpaşu (metropolitan of Suceava) (1977-1982)
- Pimen Zainea (first archbishop of Suceava) (24 June 1982 – 20 May 2020)
