= Alexandru Mesian =

Romanian bishop (1937–2023)

The Right Reverend Alexandru Mesian
- Romanian Catholic Bishop of Lugoj
- Church: Romanian Greek Catholic Church
- Diocese: Romanian Catholic Eparchy of Lugoj
- Installed: 20 November 1995
- Term ended: 11 March 2023
- Predecessor: Ioan Ploscaru
- Successor: Călin Ioan Bot
- Other post: Coadjutor Bishop of Lugoj (1994-1995)

Orders
- Ordination: 8 May 1965
- Consecration: 8 September 1994 by Lucian Mureșan

Personal details
- Born: 22 January 1937 Ferneziu, Kingdom of Romania
- Died: 11 March 2023 (aged 86) Lugoj, Romania

Alexandru Mesian (22 January 1937 – 11 March 2023) was a Romanian Greek-Catholic hierarch.

== Life ==
Born in Ferneziu, now part of Baia Mare city, he graduated from Gheorghe Șincai High School. Admitted to the Roman Catholic Theological Institute of Iași in 1957, Mesian was expelled on the orders of the communist authorities the same year, as he was from a family that belonged to the banned Greek-Catholic Church. He performed his military service from 1957 to 1960, working as a technician in Baia Mare from 1950 to 1990. Mesian studied theology and was ordained a priest in secret in 1965, emerging into the open in 1990, after the fall of the regime. In 1994, he was consecrated auxiliary bishop for the Lugoj Eparchy, advancing to bishop in 1996 with the retirement of Ioan Ploscaru.

Mesian died in Lugoj on 11 March 2023, at the age of 86.
