= Mureșanu =

Mureșanu is a Romanian language surname. Notable people with the surname include:

- Andrei Mureșanu (1816–1863), Romanian poet and revolutionary
- Bogdan Mureșanu (born 1974), Romanian filmmaker
- Camil Mureşanu (1927–2015), Romanian historian and professor
- Tănase Mureșanu (1940–2007), Romanian fencer

== See also ==
- Andrei Mureșanu, Cluj-Napoca
- Andrei Mureşanu National College
- Andrei Mureşanu High School
- Mureșan
