= Békás (disambiguation) =

Békás is a Hungarian place name derived from béka ("frog") and the adjectival suffix -s, meaning "froggy" or "full of frogs". It may also refer to:

== Places ==
- Becaș – a village in the commune of Praid, Harghita County, Romania
- Bicaz – a town in Neamț County, Romania, known as Békás in Hungarian
- Bicazu Ardelean – commune in Neamț County, known in Hungarian as Gyergyóbékás
- Bicaz Gorge – known in Hungarian as Békás-szoros
- Békás – a village in Bács-Kiskun County, Hungary
- Becaș, Cluj-Napoca – a district of Cluj-Napoca named after the Becaș River, known as Békás-negyed in Hungarian

== Rivers ==
- Becaș – a river in Cluj-Napoca, Romania (Hungarian: Békás-patak)
- Bicaz_(river) – a river in Neamț County, Romania, also known as Békás-patak in Hungarian
