= Între Lacuri =

District of Cluj-Napoca, Romania

Coordinates: 46.777°N 23.632°E

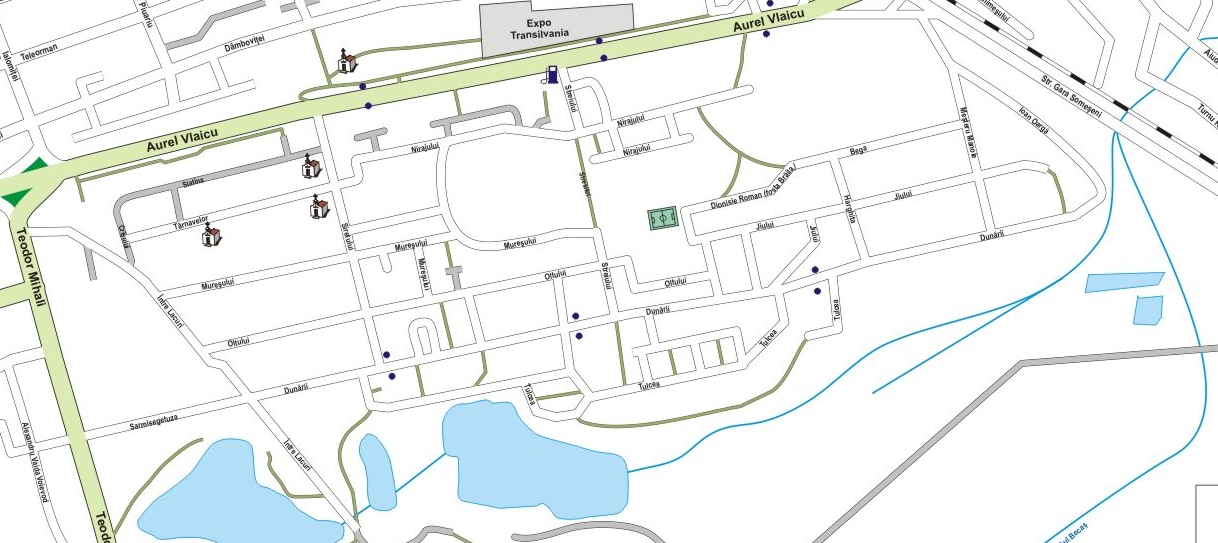
Map of the district

Între Lacuri (Hungarian: Tóköz; both Romanian and Hungarian name refer to its being located in-between lakes) is a district located in the eastern part of Cluj-Napoca, in Romania. It borders the districts of Gheorgheni and Mărăşti.
