= Muratori =

Muratori may be:

== People ==
- Casey Muratori (born 1976), American computer programmer
- Domenico Maria Muratori (1662–1744), Italian painter
- Jack Muratori (1929-2001), Republican Party lawmaker from Queens, New York
- Ludovico Antonio Muratori (1672–1750), Italian historian
- Michele Muratori (born 1983), Sammarinese politician
- Raimondo Muratori (1841-1885), Italian painter, known for portraits and depicting religious subjects
- Saverio Muratori (1910-1973), Italian architect and urban theorist
- Teresa Scannabecchi (née Teresa Muratori, 1662–1708), Baroque painter, daughter of Domenico Maria Muratori
- Vincent Muratori (born 1987), French footballer

== Other ==
- Murători, a tributary of the river Becaș in Romania
- Muratorian fragment, part of a copy of perhaps the oldest known list of the books of the New Testament
