= Andrei Mureșanu, Cluj-Napoca =

Andrei Mureșanu Tisztviselőtelep (Hungarian)
- District
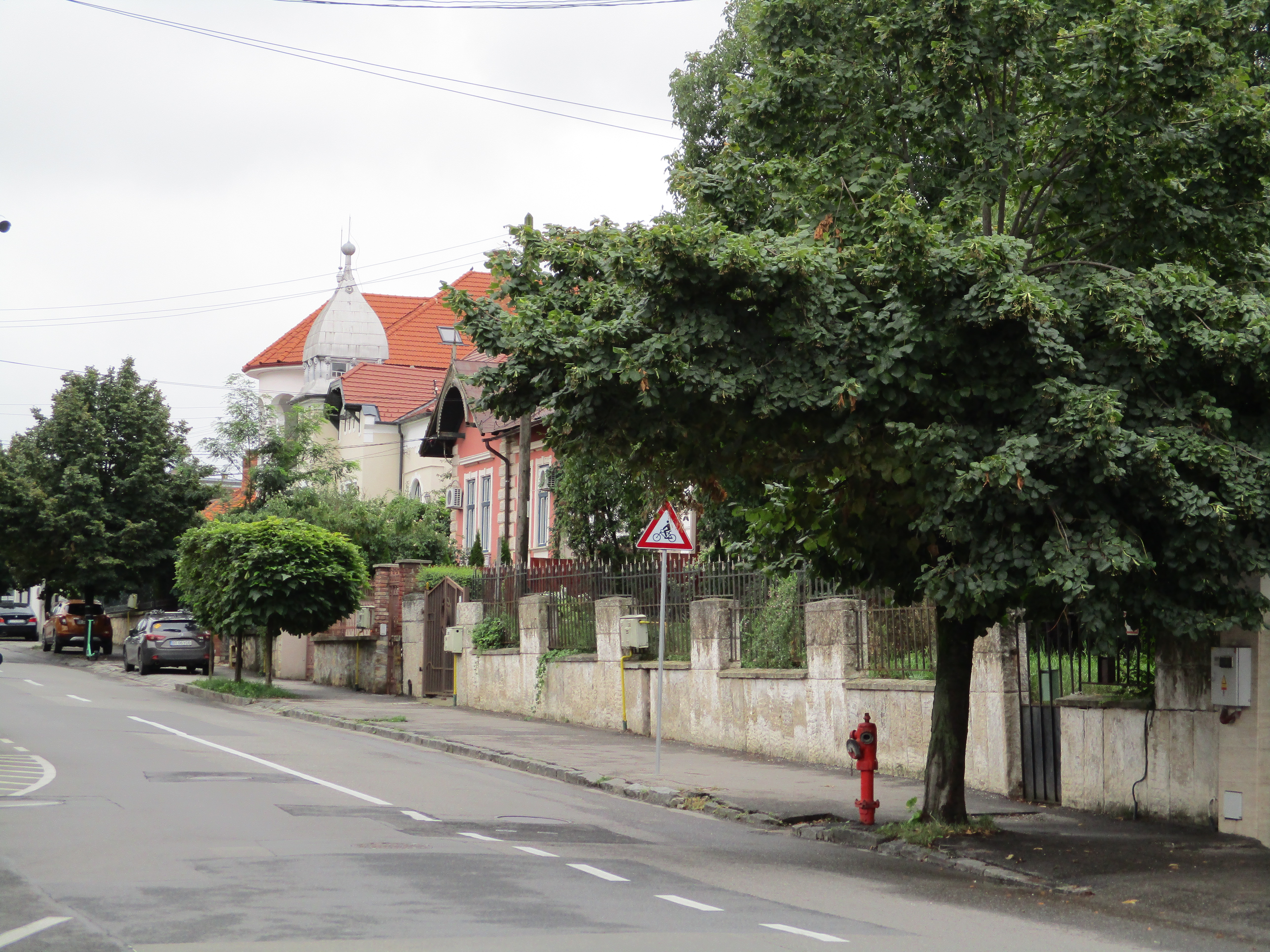
- Strada Brașov
- Interactive map of Andrei Mureșanu
- Coordinates: 46°45′40″N 23°36′07″E
- Country: Romania
- County: Cluj
- City: Cluj-Napoca
- Established: 1903

Andrei Mureșanu (Hungarian: Tisztviselőtelep) is a district located in the south-east of Cluj-Napoca in Romania. It is named after the Romanian poet and revolutionary Andrei Mureșanu.

== Geography ==
Andrei Mureșanu is situated on a gentle slope at the south-eastern edge of the historic center of Cluj-Napoca. The lower part of the district begins at roughly 350 metres above sea level near the central area and rises southwards, reaching over 400 metres towards Becaș.

== History ==
The south-eastern outskirts of Cluj developed gradually beyond the historical core. Early habitation in this direction included a poor peripheral settlement with a majority Romani population, located in the area corresponding to present-day Piața Cipariu.

By the 19th century, the steep slope south of the square was known in Hungarian as Agyagdomb (“Clay Hill”) and marked the built-up edge of the town. Beyond it lay a tree nursery, indicating the transition from the urban fringe to cultivated and semi-rural land.

Urban expansion proceeded slowly during the final half of the 19th century towards the area historically known as Békási Szőllők (Romanian: Viile Becaș) along the main outbound roads to the south and south-east: Györgyfalvi út (today: Strada Constantin Brâncuși), leading towards the village of Gheorghieni, and Tordai út (today Calea Turzii), leading towards Turda.

Some of the earliest inhabitants established on Agyagdomb were resettled there from another impoverished area of the city known as Sáncalja (below present-day Gruia), following landslides.

One of the first streets in the area to develop was Hegedűs utca, later Szondi utca and today known as Strada Anatole France.

In 1903, the former tree nursery at the city’s south-eastern edge was subdivided into building plots, marking an early step in the creation of a new residential quarter. The area later became known in Hungarian as Tisztviselőtelep (literally “civil servants’ colony”), a label commonly used in the period for planned villa-type housing districts associated with middle-class officials and professionals. In the following years, development concentrated around the new Attila út(today Strada Andrei Mureșanu), which became home to mostly affluent civil servants and intelligentsia.

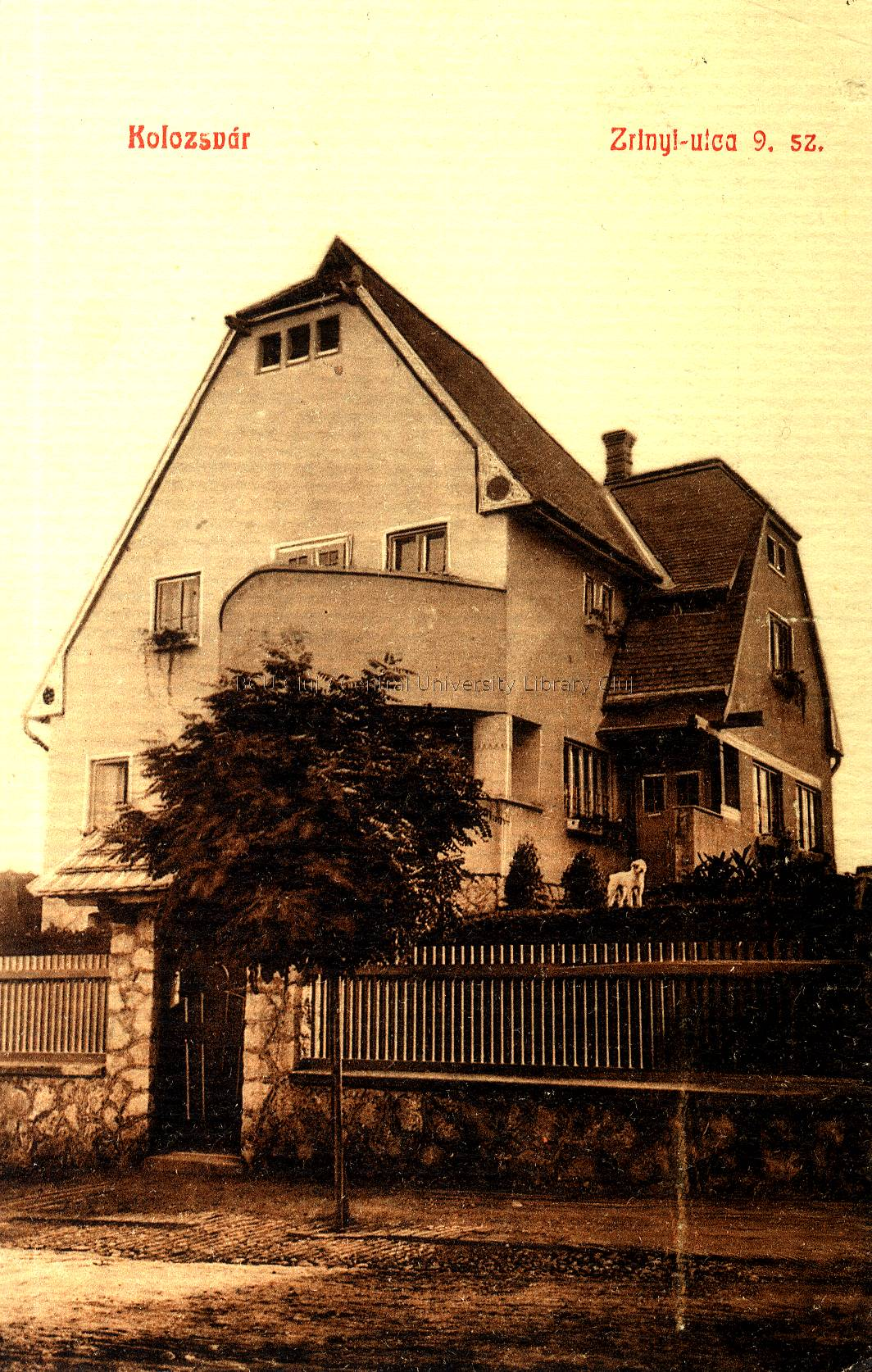
A newly built villa at Zrínyi utca 9 in the Tisztviselőtelep (c. 1910s).

Following the Union of Transylvania with Romania, the district’s main road, Attila út, was renamed by the new Romanian authorities to Andrei Mureșanu. Over time, the street-name was extended in usage to denote the wider residential area. In 1923, new building plots were allotted to civil servants of the Romanian administration on land outside the city, contributing to the southward expansion of the neighborhood.

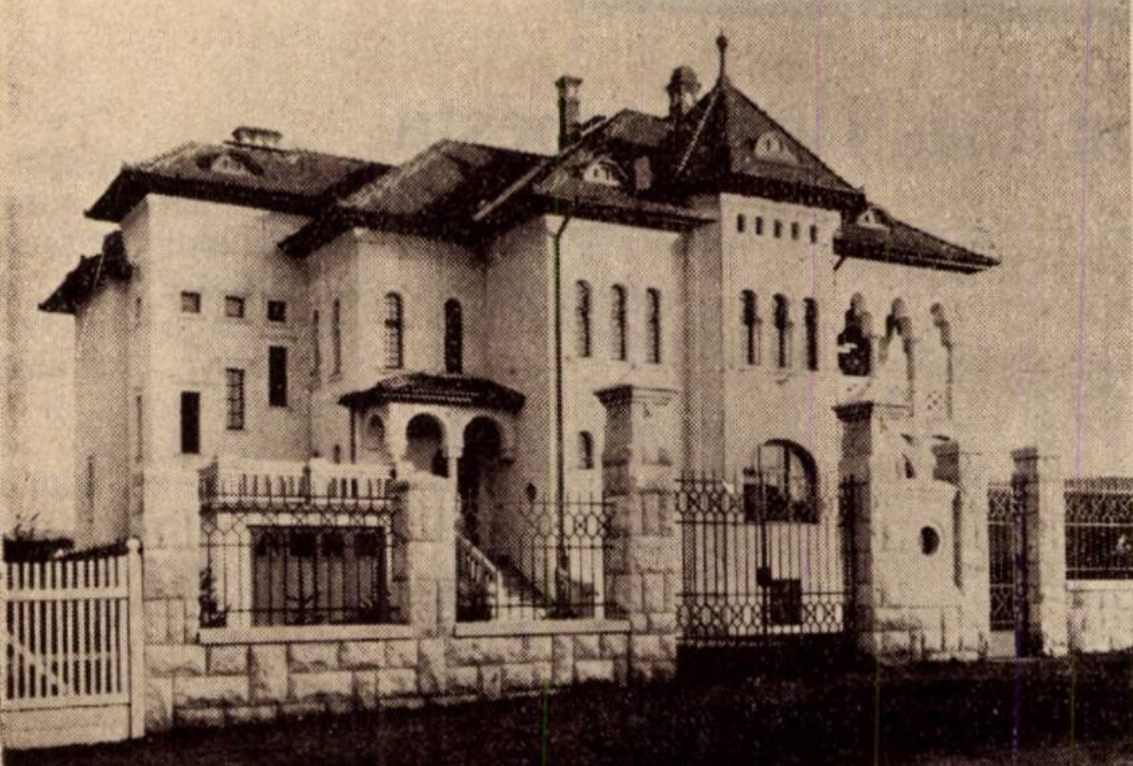
Valentin Poruțiu's villa (early 1930s), representing the emerging Romanian Revival architecture in the district.

In the 1930s, the Franciscans established Alverna monastery (named after La Verna in Tuscany) on the south-eastern outskirts of Cluj. The main building was consecrated in 1930. The name is still recognizable for the local population, it is preserved in the name of Strada Alverna.

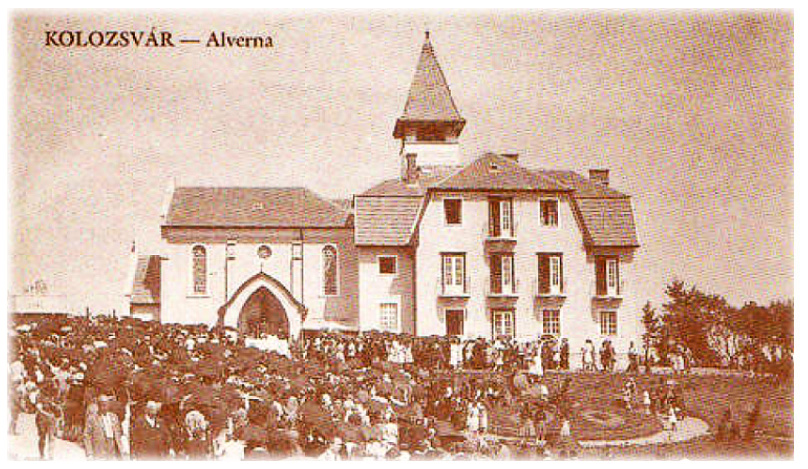
The Franciscan church at Alverna (Alvernai Ferenc-rendiek temploma) in Cluj-Napoca.

By the Second Vienna Award the district already extended towards the south-eastern edge of the city, but the slope still contained many undeveloped plots, with buildings concentrated mainly along the principal streets.

After World War II, the establishment of the communist regime in Romania brought an end to Alverna’s interwar flourishing. In 1948, the Franciscan community was banned and expelled, and the complex (including its church and grounds) was confiscated by the state.

Between 1973 and 1976, a small apartment complex (''Ansamblul Anatole France'') was inserted into the villa district: the existing houses were largely retained, but their generous garden plots were nationalised and redeveloped for mid-rise housing.

== Description ==
Today, the Andrei Mureșanu district occupies the gentle slope between the city centre and Becaș, and much of its historic built fabric remains intact. The lower part, closer to the centre, is still characterized by early 20th-century villas associated with civil servants and affluent families from the Austro-Hungarian period, with architecture largely reflecting eclectic and Art Nouveau influences, while the upper historic area was substantially shaped by interwar construction for the Romanian intelligentsia and civil service, where elements of Romanian Revival architecture are more prominent. Outside of this predominantly low-rise context, a small cluster of apartment blocks exists around the Anatole France area, reflecting socialist-era infill associated with systematization. By the late 20th century, most remaining plots had been built up towards the southern edge, including a heavy post-1990 expansion towards Becaș. The area remains mosttly residential.

The district includes the following listed historic monuments:

Address	Image	Name	Date built	LMI code
Attila út (Str. Andrei Mureșanu) 15		Serbán House	20th century	CJ-II-m-B-07431
Attila út 16		The former seat of the Erdélyi Gazdasági Egyesület, today the Passport Service	1911	CJ-II-m-B-07432
Attila út 20		Somogyi House	1906	CJ-II-m-B-07433
str. Zrínyi 7		Kolumbán House	20th century	CJ-II-m-B-07507
str. Dimitrie Bolintineanu 16		Residence of Alexandru I. Lapedatu	1925	CJ-IV-m-B-07829
str. Nicolae Iorga 6		Bârsan residence	20th century	CJ-IV-m-B-07840
str. Măcinului 20		Residence of Lucian Blaga	1925	CJ-IV-m-B-07847
str. Andrei Mureșanu 31		Residence of Ion Agârbiceanu	1915	CJ-IV-m-B-07849
