= Arnold Gross =

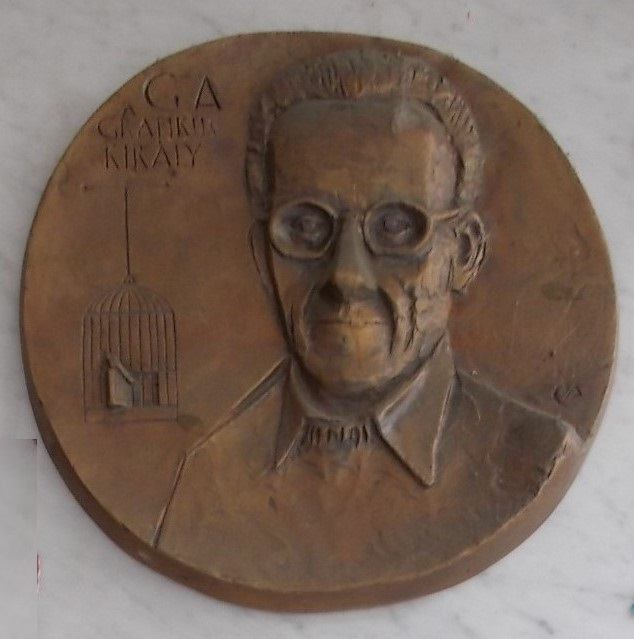
Bronze plaque of Gross installed in 2016 in Budapest, Hungary

Arnold Gross (Hungarian: Gross Arnold; 25 November 1929 - 22 January 2015) was a Romanian-born Hungarian graphic artist and painter known for richly detailed, hand-coloured etchings that depict a densely populated fairy-tale world of gardens, small towns and imaginary cities. Born in Turda in historical Transylvania, Romania, he became one of the best-known and most widely collected Hungarian graphic artists and was regarded as a renewer of the etching medium in Hungary. Gross received the Kossuth Prize, the Munkácsy Mihály Prize and the title Artist of the Nation, and from 1993 he was a member of the Széchenyi Academy of Literature and Arts. He died in Budapest on 22 January 2015.

== Early life and education ==
Gross was born on 25 November 1929 in Turda, Transylvania, in the Kingdom of Romania, to painter and drawing teacher Károly Gross and his wife Ilona Kovrig.

In 1940, the family moved to Oradea, where Gross continued his schooling.

In 1947, Gross left Romania and crossed illegally into Hungary with a rucksack of drawings, settling in Budapest. Despite not having completed the secondary school, he was admitted to the Academy of Applied Arts in Budapest due to the strength of his portfolio.

At the College of Fine Arts his teachers included Jenő Barcsay, Gyula Hincz, György Kádár, György Konecsni and Károly Koffán, and he was strongly influenced by the work of old masters such as Jan van Eyck, Rembrandt and Albrecht Dürer as well as contemporary Hungarian artists including Béla Kondor and Vladimir Szabó. Gross initially aspired to be a painter but, inspired by his study of Rembrandt and Dürer etchings at the Museum of Fine Arts, he turned increasingly towards reproducible graphic art and the etching technique.

== Career ==
From the mid-1950s, Gross began to exhibit regularly in Budapest and in Hungarian provincial galleries, showing paintings and increasingly his etchings and graphic works. His first major solo shows in Budapest were held in venues such as the Fényes Adolf Hall, Mednyánszky Hall, Dürer Hall and the Helikon Gallery, and from the 1960s he exhibited widely abroad. Gross's work was shown in major European and overseas art centres, including Rome, London, Vienna, Hamburg, Cologne, Brussels, Stockholm, Helsinki, Amsterdam, Athens, New Delhi, Bergen, Trieste, Tokyo and Los Angeles.

In the late 1960s and 1970s, he had solo shows in Los Angeles, Hamburg and Athens, while his works were also included in international graphic biennials and thematic exhibitions. In 1949 the graphics department on which he studied was transferred to the College of Fine Arts (Képzőművészeti Főiskola), where he graduated in 1953.

In September 2014, the Gross Arnold Galéria és Kávézó, commonly known as "Arnoldo", opened at Bartók Béla út 46 in Budapest as a combined gallery and café dedicated to his art and personality, a venue that he himself initiated and opened shortly before his death. The Arnoldo gallery regularly hosts exhibitions of his works and related cultural events, further contributing to the dissemination of his visual universe.

== Artistic style and themes ==
Gross became widely known for his copperplate etchings, which he coloured individually with a distinctive technique that ensured no two impressions were identical and which transformed the traditionally monochrome medium into brightly coloured, rhythmically structured images. His prints are characterised by fine, lace-like lines, dense ornamentation and a lack of empty space, with every part of the surface filled by figures, plants, architectural motifs and decorative details.
