= Júlia Sigmond =

Hungarian-Romanian puppet actor, Esperanto writer and editor (1929–2020)

Júlia Sigmond (11 July 1929 – 23 March 2020) was a Hungarian-Romanian puppet actor, Esperanto writer and editor. She was born in Turda and died in Piacenza of coronavirus disease 2019.

== Career ==
Júlia Sigmond was a puppet actor of the Hungarian language section of the puppet theater of Cluj, Romania. She became an Esperantist in 1956. She was the editor-in-chief of the magazine Bazaro and a regular contributor to the magazine Monato.

== Works ==
- 2001 – Mi ne estas Mona Lisa, (pub. Bero, Berkeley), 2nd ed. in 2024, ISBN 9781882251469
- 2008 – Kiam mi estis la plej feliĉa en la vivo? (compiled by the author), (pub. Triade, Cluj-Napoca)
- 2009 – Novaj fabeloj pri Ursido Pu kaj Porketo (kd)
- 2011 – Nomoj kaj sortoj (12 novels), (pub. Exit, Cluj-Napoca)
- 2013 – Dialogo (original poem with 52 translations), (pub. Exit, Cluj-Napoca)
- 2013 – Libazar' kaj Tero (joint work with Sen Rodin, her husband), (pub. Mondial, New York)
- 2015 – Kvodlibeto (joint work with Sen Rodin, her husband), (pub. Exit, Cluj-Napoca)
- 2016 – Kvin geamikoj, (pub. Exit, Cluj-Napoca)
- 2017 – Fronto aŭ dorsko, (pub. Dokumenta Esperanto-Centro, Đurđevac)
- 2017 – Doloro (original poem with 54 translations), (pub. Exit, Cluj-Napoca)
- 2018 – Steĉjo-Fabeloj, (pub. Exit, Cluj-Napoca)
- 2018 – Dankon (original poem with 62 translations), (pub. Exit, Cluj-Napoca)
- 2019 – 90, various texts on the occasion of the author's 90th birthday (pub. Exit, Cluj-Napoca)
