= Mureșan =

Mureșan is a Romanian language surname. The name means "person from Mureș", a county of Romania.

Notable people with the name include:

- Andrei Mureșan (born 1985), Romanian football player
- Gabriel Mureșan (1982–2026), Romanian football player
- Gheorghe Mureșan (born 1971), Romanian basketball player, noted for being the tallest player in NBA history
- Lucian Mureșan (1931–2025), Romanian major archbishop and cardinal of the Catholic Church
- Mihai Mureșan (born 2002), România rugby union player
- Mircea Mureșan (1928–2020), Romanian film director
- Robert Mureșan (born 1991), Romanian motorcycle racer
- Sever Mureșan (1948–2024), Romanian tennis player
- Siegfried Mureșan (born 1981), Romanian economist and politician

== See also ==
- Mureșanu
