= Mădălina Tătar =

Romanian footballer (born 2002)

Personal information
- Full name: Mădălina Maria Tătar
- Date of birth: 19 December 2002 (age 23)
- Place of birth: Romania
- Position: Midfielder

Senior career*
Years	Team	Apps	(Gls)
2020–2021	Damaiense	14	(0)
2021–2022	Benfica	8	(2)
2022–2023	Racing Power	24	(3)
2023–	Vitória Guimarães	2	(0)

International career
- Romania
- * Club domestic league appearances and goals

Mădălina Maria Tătar (born 19 December 2002) is a Romanian footballer who played as a midfielder for Vitória Guimarães.

== Biography ==
Tătar is a native of Turda, Romania. She attended high school in Lisbon, Portugal, where she studied economics.

In 2021, Tătar signed for Portuguese side Benfica, helping the club win the league. She has been described as "one of the biggest hopes of women's football in Romania". Tătar mainly operated as a midfielder and as a left-winger while playing for Portuguese side Damaiense.

Tătar is the daughter of Lucian and Olguța Tătar.
