= Universitas Valachorum =

Universitas Valachorum (Estate of the Vlachs) is the Latin denomination for an estate, an institution of self-government of the Romanians in medieval Transylvania, which then belonged to the Kingdom of Hungary.

== History ==
For a certain period of time, when summoned by the king of Hungary or the voivode of Transylvania to the general assembly of Transylvania (congregatio generalis), the Universitas Valachorum attended the assembly together with the other three Estates of Transylvania: nobility, Saxons, and Székelys (universis nobilibus, Saxonibus, Syculis et Olachis in partibus Transiluanis). Assemblies on a smaller scale, concerning only a number of Transylvanian counties, at which Romanian representatives were present, are also known.

There are only two general assemblies of Transylvania at which Romanian participation is documented with complete certainty based on written sources (at least as of 1288): one in Alba Iulia, summoned by King Andrew III în 1291, and one Turda in May 1355, connected to a letter sent by King Louis I.

The structure of the Universitas Valachorum placed the leadership of common Romanians upon their own nobility (voivodes, knezes), enjoying a jurisdiction based on their own laws (ius valachicum).

=== 13th century ===
In 1288, in the face of external danger such as Tatars, Cumans, Saracens and other pagans (omnino Tartarorum vel Cumanum Saracenum vel Meugarium) the universitas of the Romanians was called together with the other Estates (universisque nobilibus Ungarorum, Saxonibus, Syculis et Volachis) and Church representatives of two counties, Brașov and Sibiu, to defend Christian faith, according to the letter of Lodomer, Archbishop of Esztergom.

In 1291, the Romanian representatives were summoned to take part in the general assembly of the Estates of Transylvania, which took place in Alba Iulia after being summoned by King Andrew III.

=== 14th century ===
A scarcity of written sources led researchers to believe for a while that from 1291 on, it would only be the representatives of privileged Romanian districts that would convene, and only at separate assemblies, so that the formation of a united autonomous Romanian commonwealth such as those of the Szeklers and Saxons never did come about. Some Hungarian historians attribute this outcome to the Romanian knezes' and voivodes' lack of interest in the creation of this type of wider representation, which is the same interpretation offered in 2015 by Romanian historian Adrian Magina for a similar behaviour of Romanian local nobles in the Banat during the mid-15th – mid-17th centuries (see below).

However, as of now the last known document attesting the participation of the Universitas Valachorum in a general assembly of the Estates (congregatio generalis) of Transylvania is dated May 1355, when such an event took place in Turda/Torda. There are six surviving documents which describe the proceedings, dated between 23–26 May, and each among them characterises the participants in a different way, from only mentioning the noblemen, to the other extreme, of exaggerating by claiming that all people, regardless of rank, either settled or present in Transylvania, have participated in the assembly. This fact is interpreted by Ioan-Aurel Pop to show that other surviving documents referring to other assemblies, which only mention the nobles as being present, do not exclude the possibility that the other Estates, including the Romanians, were actually participating. The last document from Turda, the one with the most inclusive list of participants, specifically mentions the "clergy, magnates, noblemen, Szeklers, Saxons, Romanians, and the other people" etc. Pop sees as certain the participation of the Romanians at least until the restrictive measures introduced in 1366 by Louis I, after which date it is only possible that they may have been invited sporadically.

=== Banat: charters of 1457 and 1609 ===
In 1457, King Ladislas V the Posthumous issued a charter which set up the legal foundation for a universitas of the Wallachian communities in the highlands of the Banate of Severin. There, in eight districts, most of them part of the military border structure of the Banat, the Wallachians constituted the majority of the population, nobility included, and they had rendered important military services to the kingdom. The royal diploma reaffirmed and enhanced earlier privileges, which were explicitly referenced in the document. The charter established a set of exclusive legal rights over the united territory of the eight highland districts, thus creating an essential condition for an Universitas Valachorum in that region. The Wallachians, subjects to the ius valachicum, were to be judged only by their own lord. However, they had no such lord, and King Ladislas established their right to appeal directly to him if they were dissatisfied with local court rulings. In effect, this meant that the eight districts were to become legally subjected directly and exclusively to the king. The absence of a Wallachian lord distinguished them from the Saxons, who had their own comes. Lastly, the king set the nobles and knezes in the Banat on an equal footing with the true nobility in the rest of the kingdom. For this, Ladislas removed the juridical and confessional restrictions which had massively limited their ascendance to the first Estate of the realm. The fact that until the Ottoman conquest of their districts in 1658, only a small number of local noble families had acceded to higher political office shows that they rather stayed in their local, familiar places. Once the Ottoman advance led to the separation of a new Principality of Transylvania from the kingdom, in the Banat–never more than a marginal part of the new state–local nobles preferred regional positions. In exchange, the Wallachian privileges were not contested by the princes.

King Ladislas died soon after issuing the charter, and the following king, Matthias Corvinus, never implemented some of the provisions, chiefly the appointment of a lord for the Wallachians. In the second half of the fifteenth century, the military role of the Wallachians was diminished by Serbian noblemen in exile, who took over the defense of the Danube fords against the Ottomans. Still, in 1609, representatives of the Wallachians of the Upper Banat – noblemen, knezes and commoners – requested and received a reconfirmation of their privileges from the prince of Transylvania, Gabriel Bethlen. When a few educated nobles did finally try to introduce the idea of a community through language rather than social origin in the mid-seventeenth century, it was already too late, as the entire Banat became incorporated into the Ottoman Empire in 1658. As a result of history and self-imposed restrictions, the Romanian universitas never came to be, in spite of the favourable conditions created by the fifteenth-century diploma, a situation which contrasts with that of the Saxons, who had established their own university in the 1480s.

== Notes ==
^{1}Olachorum is Latin genitive plural for Olachus, Latin form of Vlach, meaning "Romanian"
