= Andrei Mureșanu National College =

Andrei Mureșanu National College (Romanian: Colegiul Național "Andrei Mureșanu") may refer to one of two educational institutions in Romania:

- Andrei Mureșanu National College (Bistrița)
- Andrei Mureșanu National College (Dej)

There is also an Andrei Mureșanu High School in Brașov.
