= Gheorgheni, Cluj-Napoca =

Gheorgheni Györgyfalvi-negyed (Hungarian)
- District of Cluj-Napoca
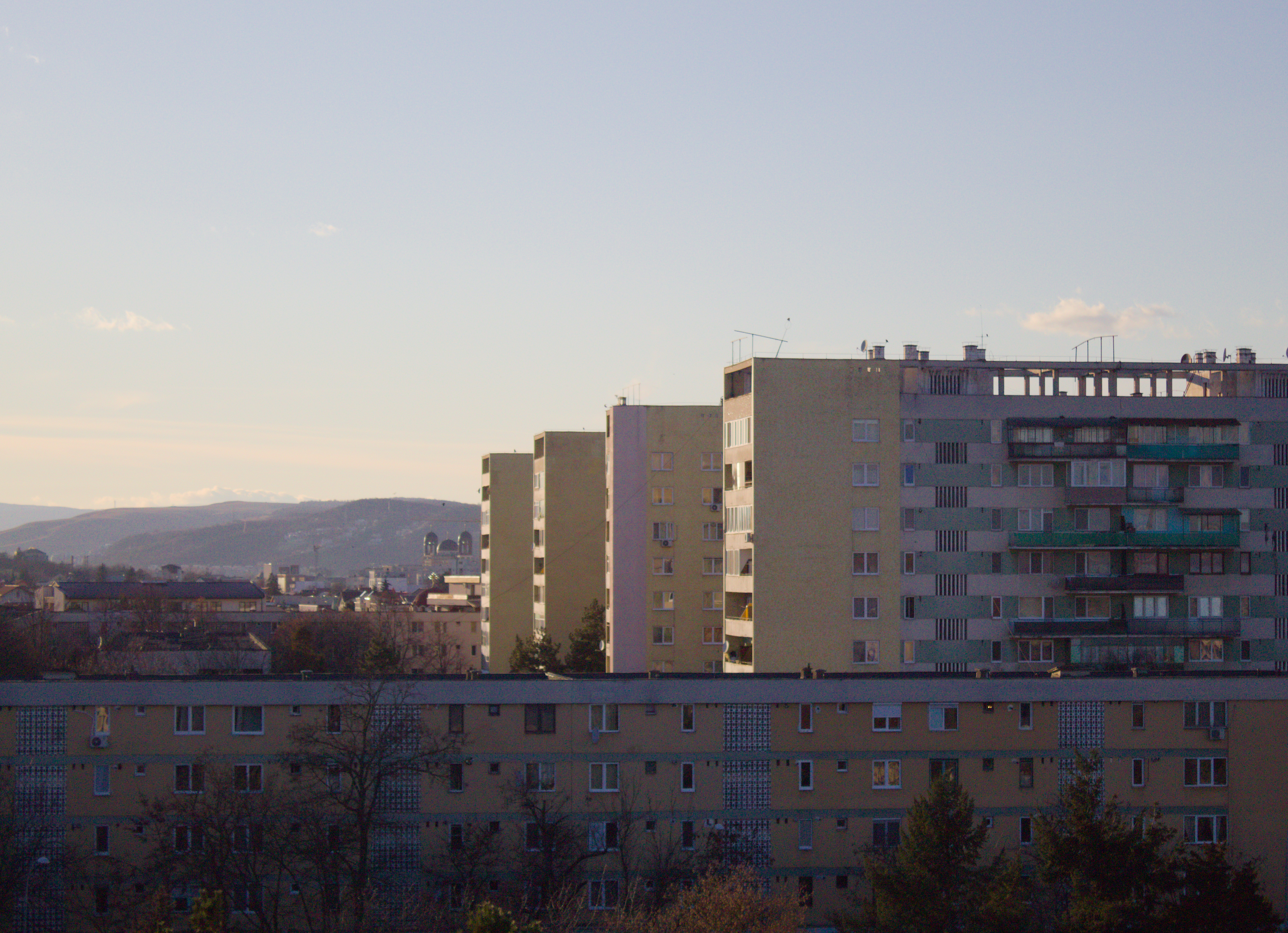
- Microdistrict 2
- Interactive map of Gheorgheni
- Coordinates: 46°45′53″N 23°37′13″E
- Country: Romania
- County: Cluj
- City: Cluj-Napoca
- Established: 1964

Gheorgheni (Hungarian: Györgyfalvi-negyed) is a district located in the south-east of Cluj-Napoca in Romania. It has inherited its name from the nearby village of Gheorghieni (Hungarian: Györgyfalva), part of Feleacu commune.

== Geography ==
The district is located on a terrace known as Pietroasa (Hungarian: Kövespad), characterized by a distinct northern border delineated by a prominent scarp. The eastern sector is situated on a broader flat expanse historically recognized as Râtul Bivolilor (Hungarian: Bivalyrét), boasting two notable natural lakes and a minor watercourse known as Becaș.

== History ==
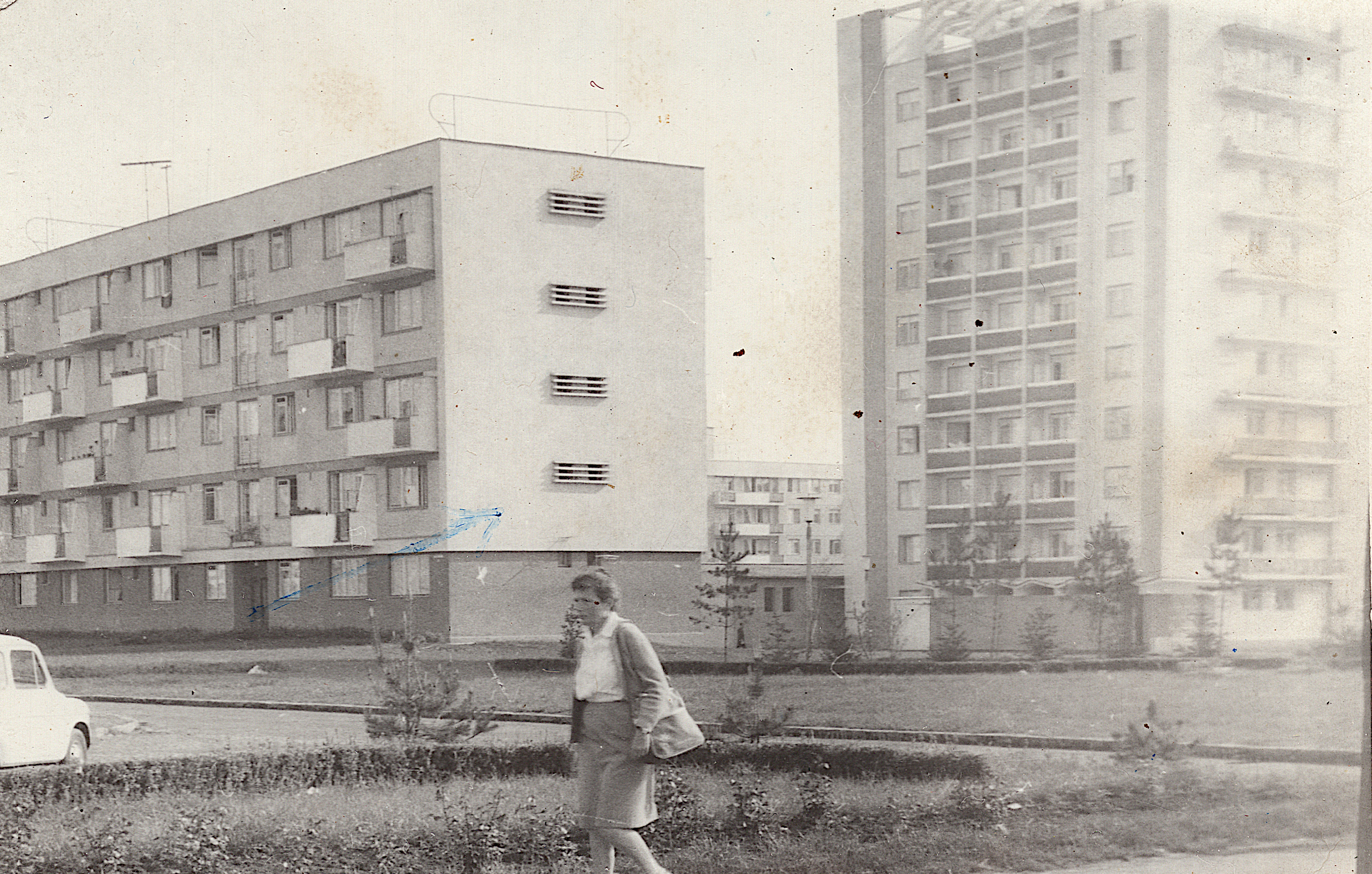
Microdistrict 1 in the 1970's

The contemporary configuration of the district has evolved along pathways delineated by two rural thoroughfares leading to the adjacent settlements of Gheorghieni and Pata. In the initial half of the 19th century, agrarian communities commenced establishing residences along these routes to provide for the increasing population of Cluj. Subsequently, in the latter half of the same century, early industrial laborers were attracted to the region by the opportunities engendered by the process of industrialization. This gradual settling into the area would transform the two rural byways into the main streets of the district: Strada Gheorgheni (Hungarian: Györgyfalvi út; now: Strada Constantin Brâncuși) and Strada Pata (Hungarian: Pata utca; now: Bulevardul Nicolae Titulescu) Following the Union of Transylvania with Romania, today’s familiar road network began to take shape. The community of laborers featured a mix of Romanians and Hungarians, while the farming community remained predominantly Hungarian. Towards the historical center, Strada Pata also housed a significant Roma community.

By the time of the Second Vienna Award, most of today’s road network had already been established. In 1943, as part of the National Association for the Protection of the People and the Family (Országos Nép- és Családvédelmi Alap) under Hungarian administration a neighborhood of 20 duplex houses was built at the southern end of Méhes utca (now Strada Septimiu Albini), featuring a total of 40 dwellings and a school. These homes were offered at discounted prices to large families. The project was designed by architect Károly Kós.

In the 1950s, a considerable expanse situated along the southern border of the Gheorgheni district was designated for agricultural and research endeavors overseen by the Horticultural Research Station. This establishment, under the supervision of Palocsay Rudolf, was instituted to undertake botanical investigations. The station's enduring imprint is discernible in its orchards, cultivated fields, and greenhouse facilities, which persistently delineate the district's southern periphery.

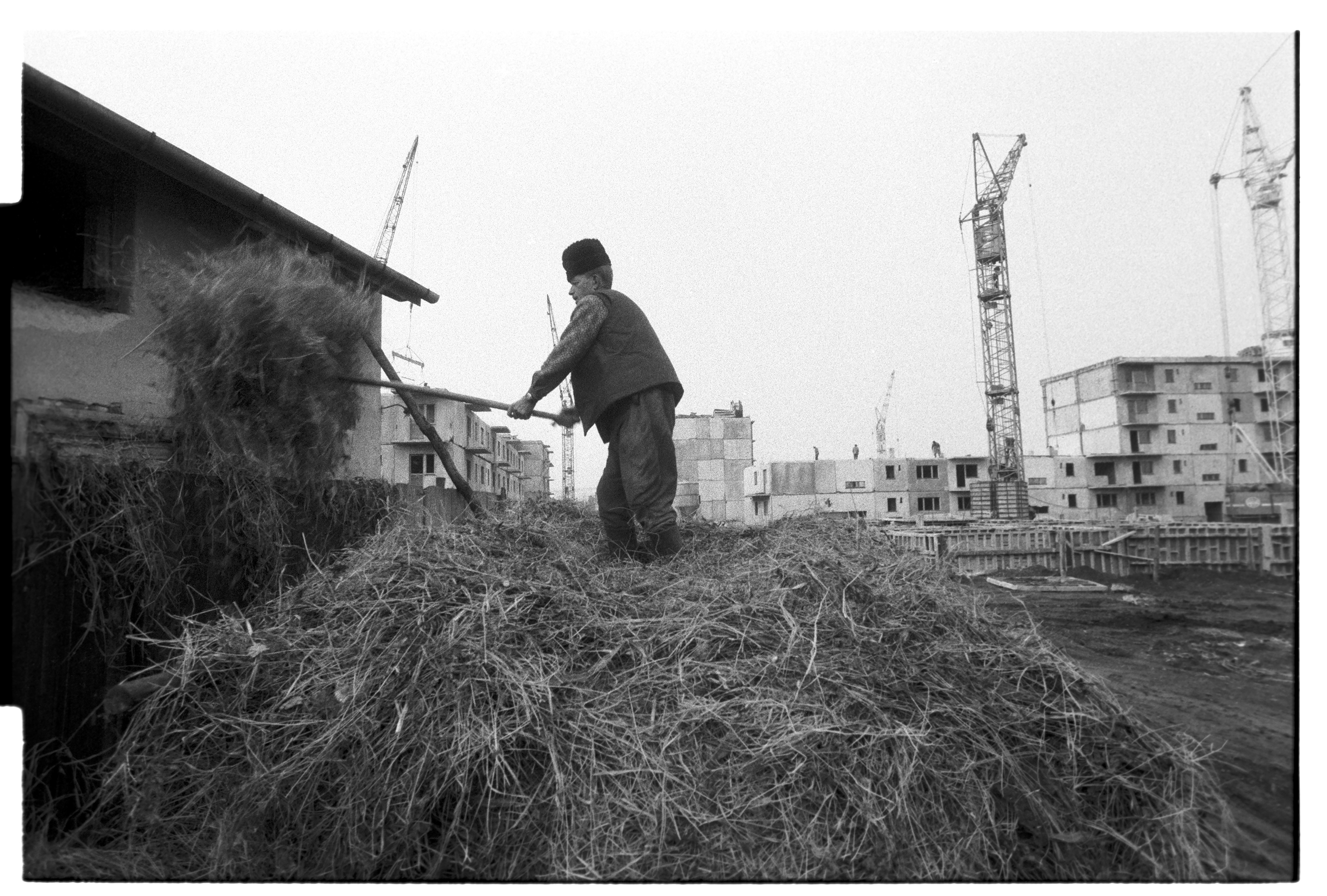
Farming communities being replaced by Systematization on Strada Pata

The year 1964 marked a pivotal moment in the district's history. Under the burgeoning communist rule, a new form of urban development emerged on the flat, previously undeveloped farmland at the terminus of Strada Pata. This project, designed in the Soviet microdistrict style, encompassed four areas and provided housing for 30,000 people. Concurrently, the area was officially designated as a distinct district within the city, bearing the name Gheorgheni. Throughout the 1980s, the traditional private homes along Strada Pata underwent transformation through the Systematization movement, replaced by modern apartment buildings. The road was expanded into a four-lane boulevard.

== Description ==
The current structure of the district remains anchored in the two main thoroughfares around which it developed. The eastern end features a residential area constructed in the microdistrict style, distinguished by an unusual abundance of urban green spaces amidst the city's tightly packed landscape. Nicolae Titulescu Boulevard, on the other hand, comprises a more densely populated area with apartment buildings, while the adjacent regions still preserve the original private family homes. In addition to residential areas, the district boasts numerous educational institutions, including schools, kindergartens, and even some faculties of Babeș-Bolyai University. The eastern end is also home to Iulius Mall Cluj.
