= Raimondo Muratori =

Italian painter (1841–1885)

Raimondo Muratori (Modena, August 30, 1841 - 1885) was an Italian painter, known for portraits and depicting religious subjects.

He was a resident of Modena, where he attended the Accademia Atestina, from 1854 to 1870. At Naples, he painted a series of portraits: of an old man; one of a child, a half-figure of a Lady, and a Holy Family.
