= Murători =

- Location within Romania

Location
- Country: Romania
- Counties: Cluj County

Physical characteristics
- Mouth: Becaș
  - location: near Cluj-Napoca
  - coordinates: 46.7878°N 23.6720°E
- Length: 8 km (5.0 mi)
- Basin size: 15 km^{2} (5.8 sq mi)

Basin features
- Progression: Becaș→ Someșul Mic→ Someș→ Tisza→ Danube→ Black Sea

The Murători is a right tributary of the river Becaș in Romania. It flows into the Becaș close to its confluence with the Someșul Mic, in the eastern outskirts of Cluj-Napoca. Its length is 8 km (5.0 mi) and its basin size is 15 km^{2} (5.8 sq mi).
