= Decree of Turda =

14th century Hungarian royal decree

- Created: 28 June 1366
- Location: Torda, Kingdom of Hungary (present-day Turda, Romania)
- Author: King Louis I of Hungary
- Purpose: Determination of procedural rules

The Decree of Turda (Hungarian: tordai dekrétum; Romanian: Decretul de la Turda) was a 14th century decree by King Louis I of Hungary that granted special privileges to the Transylvanian noblemen to take measures against malefactors belonging to any nation, especially the Romanians.

While there is little proof of the decree actual application, it does mark a legal step in obtaining a dominant position for the Transylvanian nobility and it details the new ways provided to contain opponents. It also gives written evidence on the progression of the status of Romanians in Transylvania towards an inferior position.

== Background ==
Transylvania in the 14th century experienced a development of the noble counties similar to the rest of the Kingdom of Hungary, albeit at a slower pace. Transylvanian nobles were exempted from paying taxes, such as the lodging and upkeep tax, to the voievod in 1324 by decree of Charles Robert and they were granted the right of jurisdiction over the inhabitants of their lands in 1342 by Voivode Thomas Szécsényi, a right that was later confirmed by Louis I of Hungary in 1365. However, this created a situation in which people who did not reside in the noble county but had properties in it or for any other reason were not in direct service to the local noble were in the legal gap between nobility's sphere and that of the voievod, and the sphere of customary law and the King's judgement, a situation addressed by the king in 1355:

We have ordered and are ordering with this letter that, from now on, each and every one of the dignitaries, barons, nobles and people of any other estate who own land in the said parts of Transylvania, but who live in other parts of our kingdom should have the duty to take part in the public assembly of the respective Transylvanian voivode, an assembly he will convene, under kingly order, in the name of the king and in front of the royal man ordered specifically for the aforementioned parts of Transylvania, at the legal times, and that they should be required to be fully subject to their judgment and decision, as if it were ours, and to answer to those who complain against them, without consideration of some of their acts of mercy or privileges, made, given and intended for them or any of them maybe even by us or by the other kings of Hungary, our ancestors, privileges that, with this letter, we dissolve, erase and decide that they should not have any power, but only in relation to the assembly and the day of the assembly.

As the rights and lands of the nobles increased, the serfs and commoners came increasingly more under the nobility's legal jurisdiction. Already in the late 13th century the majority of royal estates, where most Romanians lived, were gifted to seignorial authorities and the 14th century social stratification led to the formalization of the distinction between kenezes confirmed by royal decree and those who were not, together with the rest of Romanian commoners. The former would then be integrated in the Hungarian nobility.

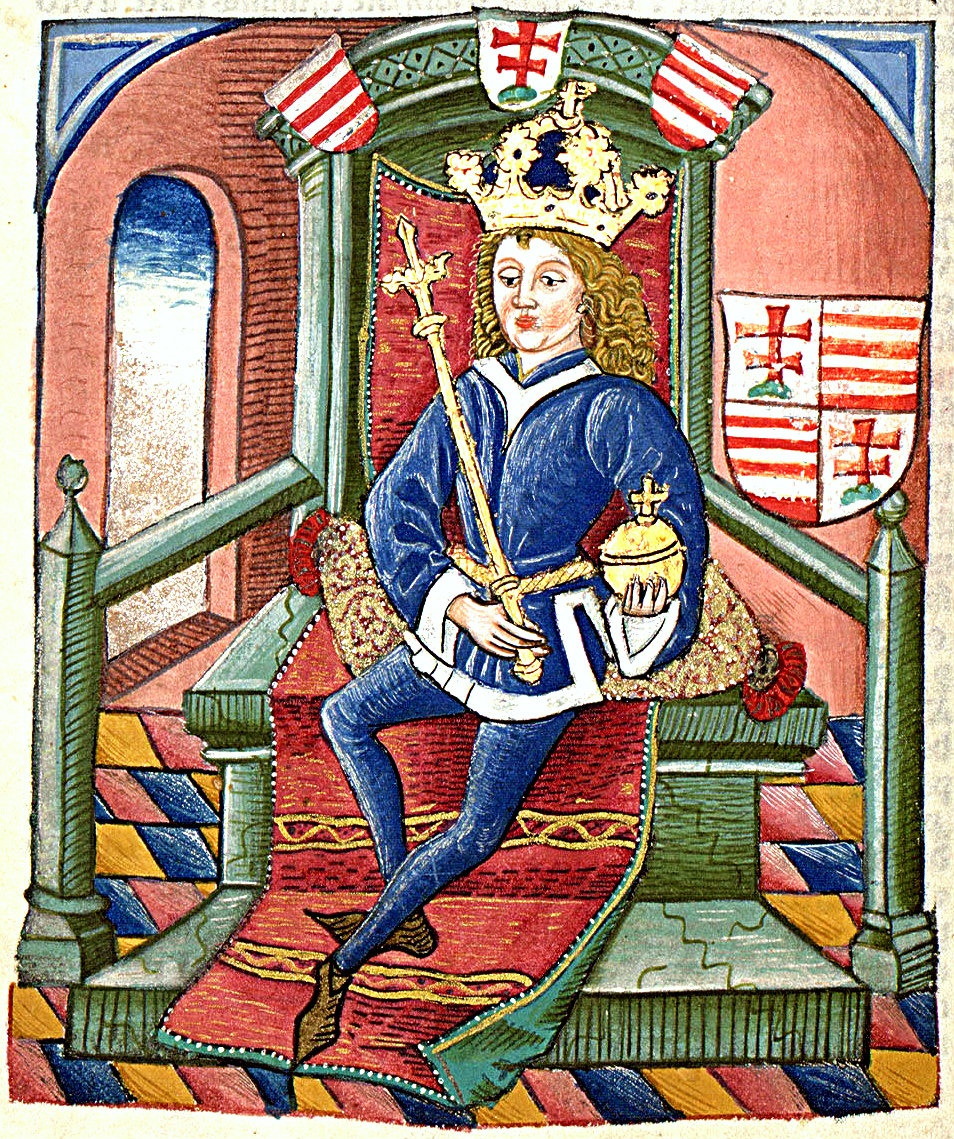
Louis I of Hungary (Chronica Hungarorum)

King Louis I of Hungary stayed in Transylvania for six months—from October to April—in 1366. On 28 June 1366, while residing in Torda (present-day Turda), the monarch issued a decree at the request of the Transylvanian noblemen. The latter had informed the King that they "have been suffering, day by day, many troubles because of the evil arts of many malefactors, especially Romanians, ...because of their way of being and their disorderly behaviour".

== The content of the decree ==
The royal decree granted special privileges to the Transylvanian noblemen "in order to remove, from this country, malefactors belonging to any nation, especially Romanians". For this purpose, the decree determines the rules of the legal procedure: If the culprit was not caught in the act but the guilt was obvious the death penalty could be applied only if fifty oath-helpers agreed so. If the culprit was a noble, the oath-helpers had to be nobles, if the culprit was a commoner, the oath-helpers could be commoners. If the culprit was caught in the act the number of oath-helpers was reduced to seven. This first part is followed by considerations on particular cases and oath-helping equivalation: a Romanian caught in the act could be condemned by oath-helpers of any rank; a Romanian who accused another commoner of a different nation could be aided by commoner oath-helpers of any nation; a Romanian who accused a noble of a criminal deed without flagrant and who cannot be aided by the required number of nobles could have knezes or Romanian commoners as oath-helpers - the kneze's testimony was fully valid if they were vested by royal letter or they were village judges, else their testimony and the commoners counted only half as much; similar conditions for the oath-helpers were stipulated in the case of a Romanian accusing a noble that was caught in the act which required only seven nobles; nobles and their servants were not to be stopped in a free town or village if the accusation was not also done while caught in the act; all who were victims of a crime had to go through legal procedure and not take revenge with a similar act; and, finally, the serfs were to be judged by the local authorities and if the accuser did not find justice in the local decision he or she could appeal to the voievod judgement.

Regarding those outlawed, the decree states that commoners or Romanians found guilty in a local or voievodal assembly can be caught and executed anywhere in the country without further judgement, unless they were pardoned by the king. The nobles found guilty could be caught in any part of the country but had to be handed over alive to the voievod who was to carry their punishment.

If an accuser did not have an estate obtained through royal letter and the defender did, the royal court would take over the case. All other cases were to be judged at voievodal level.

The final part exempts the Transylvanian nobles and their estates from paying the upkeep tax and the lucrum camerae tax.

== Context interpretation ==
Historians have not reached a consensual view of the exact circumstances of the issuing of the decree and its main purpose. István Petrovics writes that the mobile way of life of the increasing Romanian population caused their conflicts with the sedentary Hungarians. According to Ioan-Aurel Pop, the decree shows the Romanians' "muted resistance" against the monarch and the noblemen who had attempted to deprive them of their property, especially their inherited estates.

== Sources ==
- Makkai, László (1994). "The Emergence of the Estates (1172–1526)". In Köpeczi, Béla; Barta, Gábor; Bóna, István; Makkai, László; Szász, Zoltán; Borus, Judit (eds.). History of Transylvania. Akadémiai Kiadó. pp. 178–243. ISBN 963-05-6703-2.
- Petrovics, István (2009). "Foreign Ethnic Groups in the Towns of Southern Hungary in the Middle Ages". In Keene, Derek; Nagy, Balázs; Szende, Katalin (eds.). Segregation-Integration-Assimilation: Religious and Ethnic Groups in the Medieval Towns of Central and Eastern Europe. Ashgate. pp. 67–88. ISBN 978-0-7546-6477-2.
- Pop, Ioan-Aurel (2003). "Nations and Denominations in Transylvania (13th-14th Century)". In Lévai, Csaba; Vese, Vasile (eds.). Tolerance and Intolerance in Historical Perspective. Plus. pp. 111–123. ISBN 88-8492-139-2.
- Pop, Ioan-Aurel (2013). "De manibus Valachorum scismaticorum...": Romanians and Power in the Mediaeval Kingdom of Hungary: The Thirteenth and Fourteenth Centuries. Peter Lang Edition. ISBN 978-3-631-64866-7.
