= Mărăști, Cluj-Napoca =

District of Cluj-Napoca, Romania

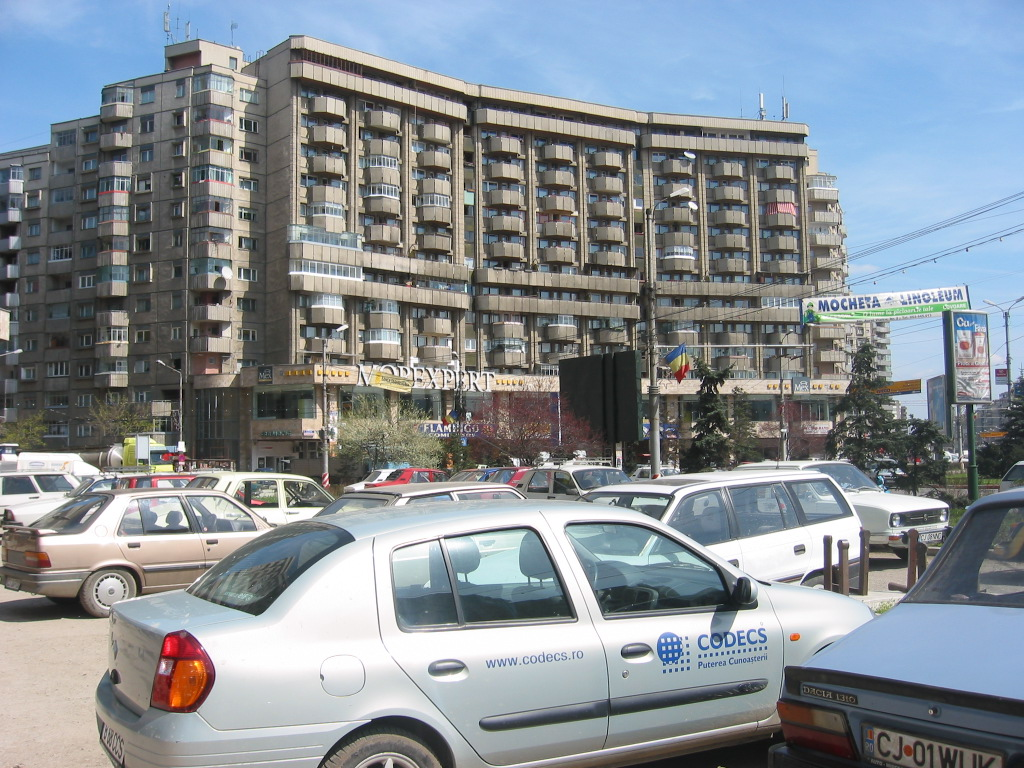
Flats in the Mărăști district

Mărăști is one of the largest housing districts in the city of Cluj-Napoca in Romania. The district was built between 1970 and 1989 for workers at the CUG plant in Cluj-Napoca.

== See also ==
- Company town
