= Becaș =

- Etymology: From Hungarian béka (“frog”) + the adjectival suffix -s, meaning “froggy” or “frog-filled”

Location
- Country: Romania
- Counties: Cluj County

Physical characteristics
- Mouth: Someșul Mic
  - location: Cluj-Napoca
  - coordinates: 46.7888°N 23.6738°E
- Length: 9 km (5.6 mi)
- Basin size: 44 km^{2} (17 sq mi)

Basin features
- Progression: Someșul Mic→ Someș→ Tisza→ Danube→ Black Sea
- Tributaries
  - right: Murători

The Becaș (Hungarian: Békás-patak) is a right tributary of the river Someșul Mic in Romania. It discharges into the Someșul Mic near Cluj-Napoca. Its length is 9 km (5.6 mi) and its basin size is 44 km^{2} (17 sq mi).

The Becaș does not have a single well-defined source but is instead formed by the merging of multiple minor streams and drainage channels in the eastern urban area of the town also known Becaș. It flows through densely populated residential areas such as Gheorgheni, and Sopor, eventually discharging into the main river near Someșeni.

Despite its relatively small size, the Becaș has drawn attention in recent years due to environmental concerns. Urban expansion, illegal dumping, and runoff from construction sites have contributed to visible pollution along parts of the river.
