= Turda =

- Municipality
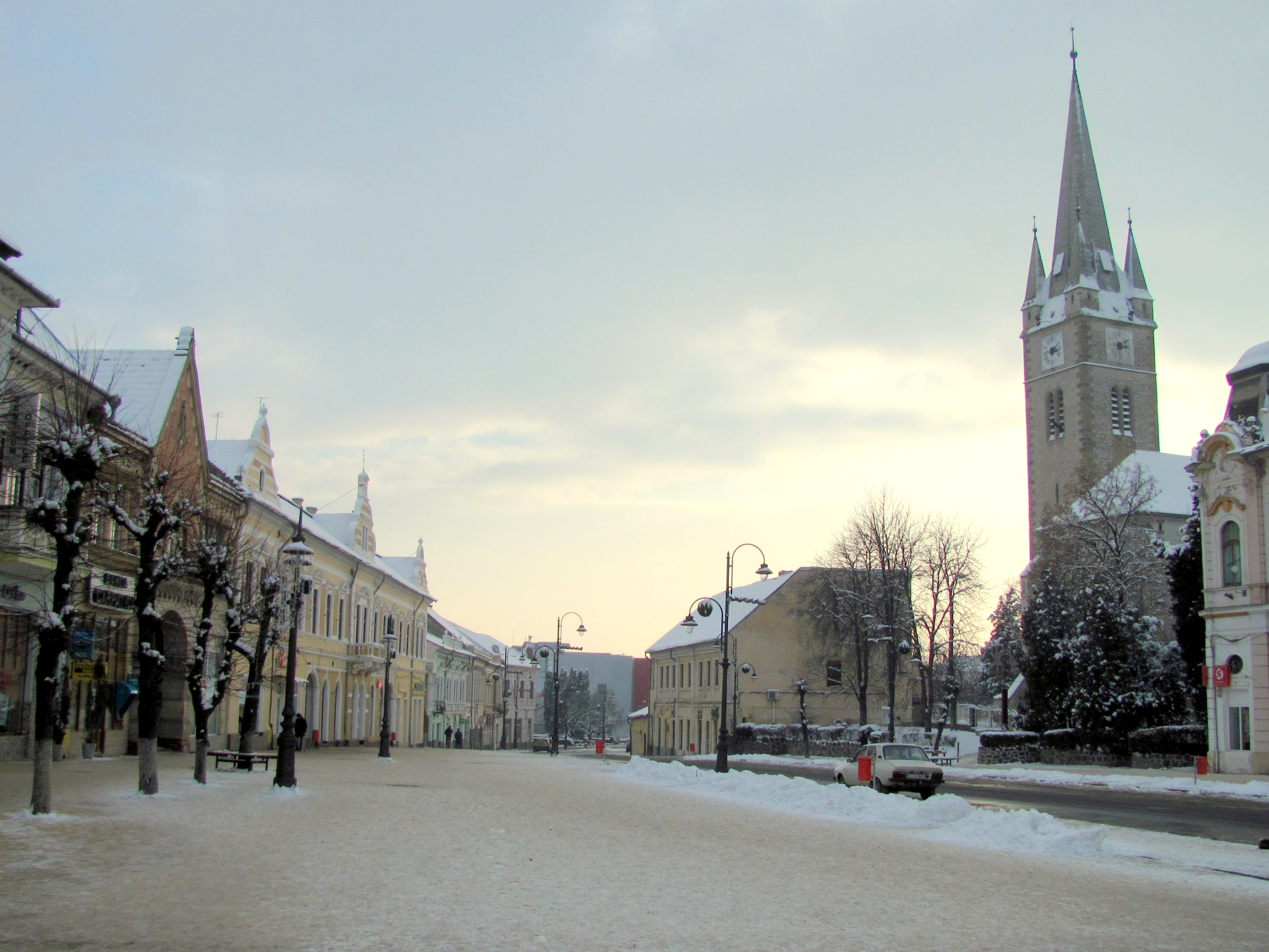
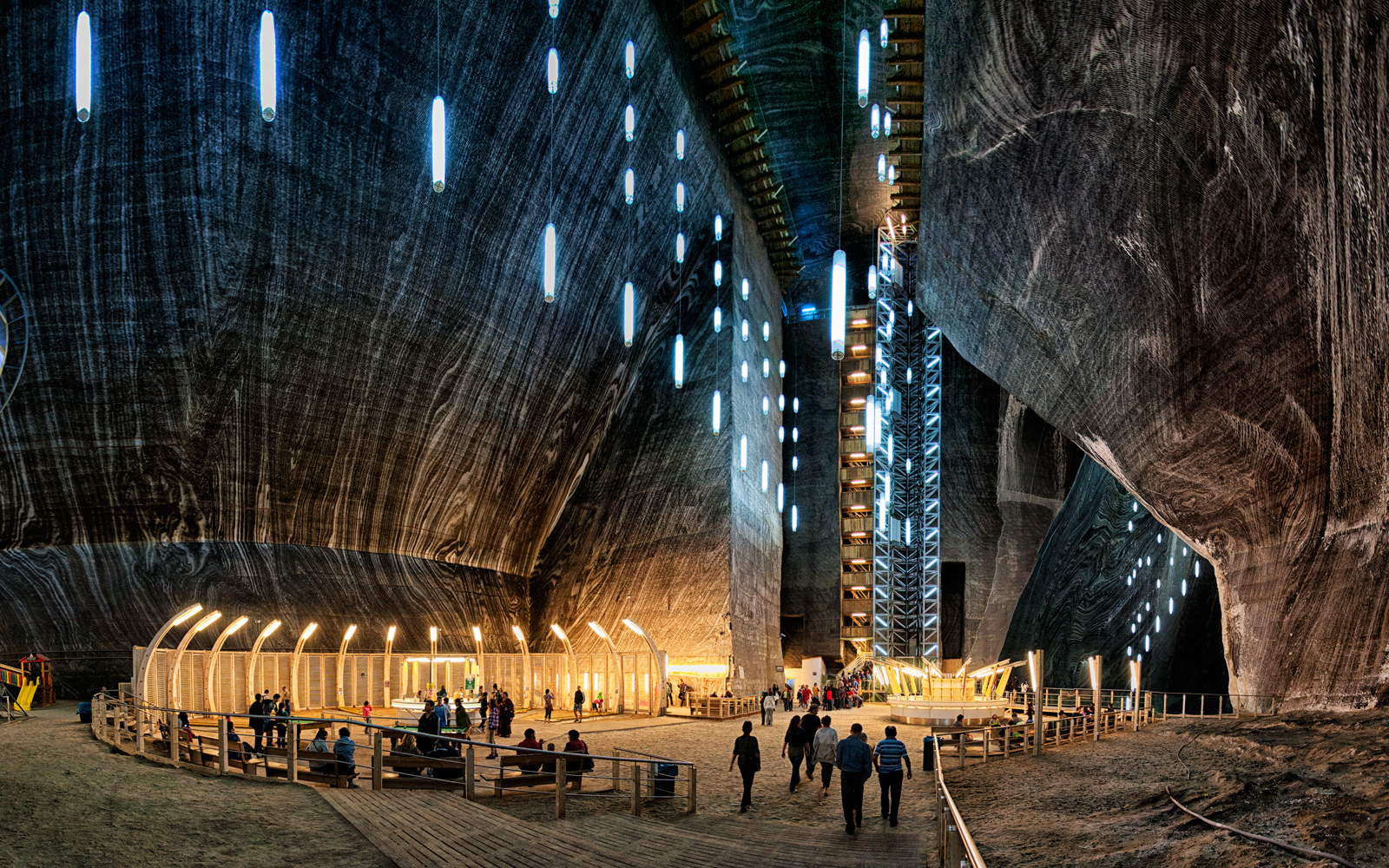
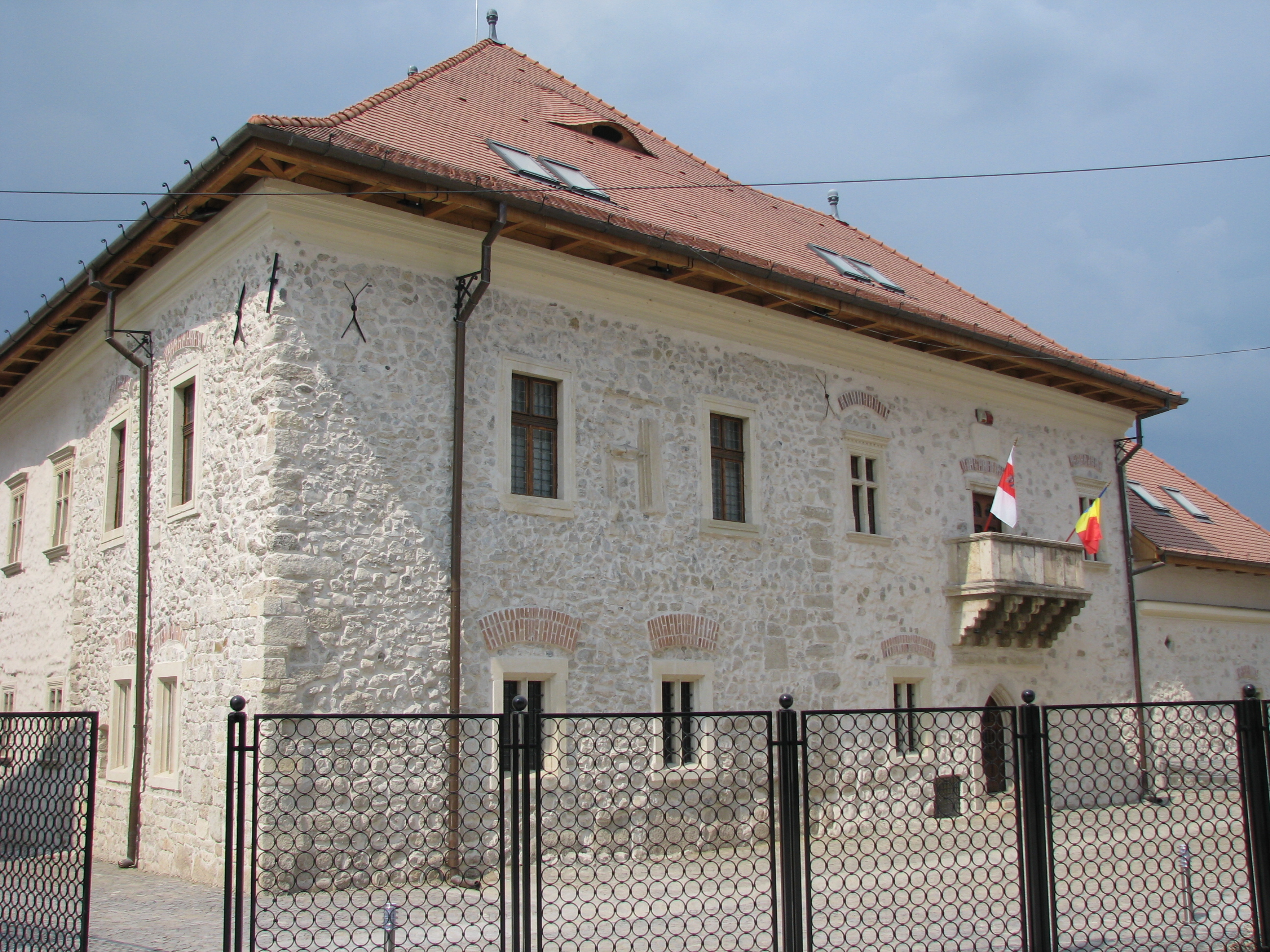
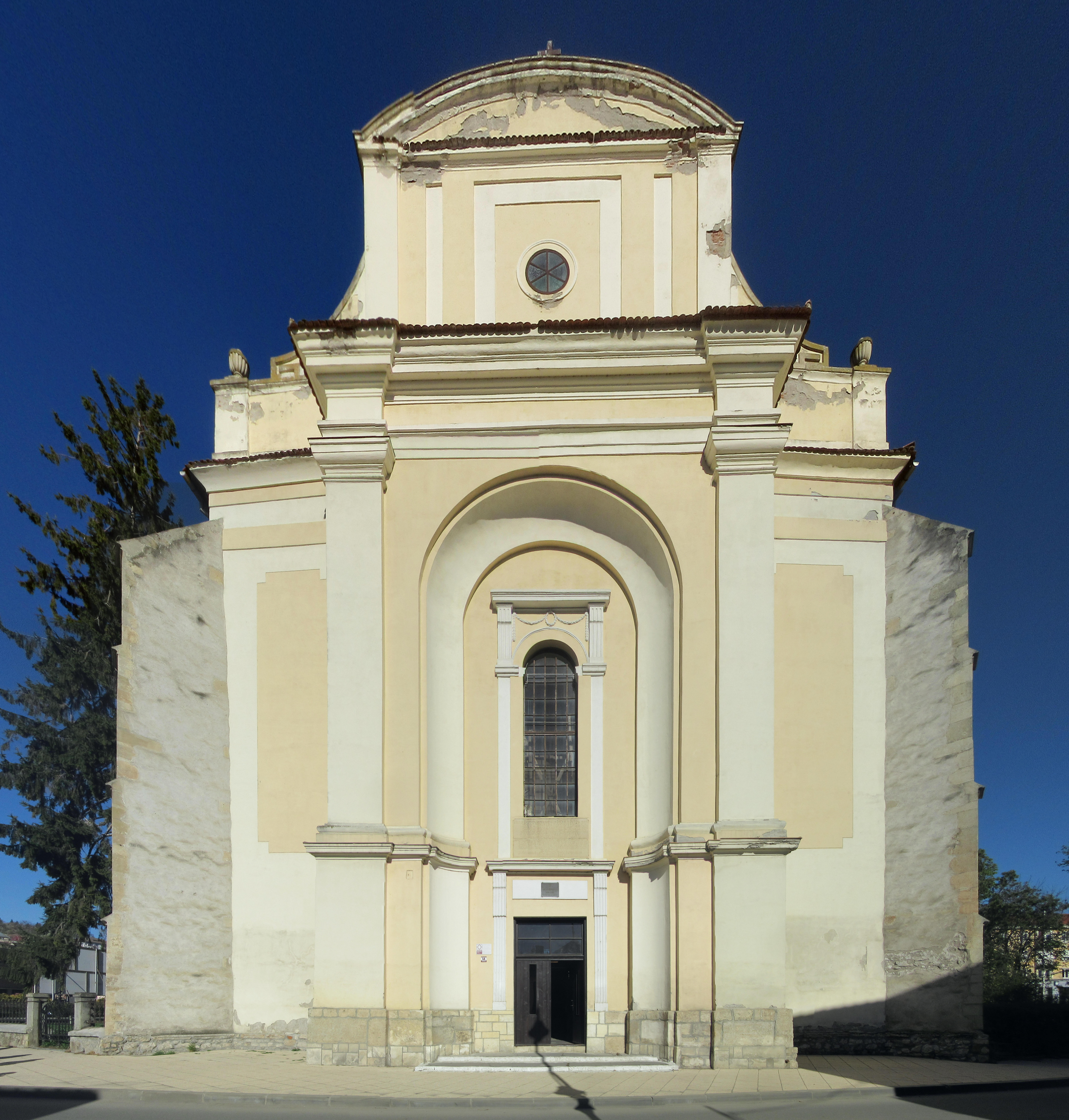
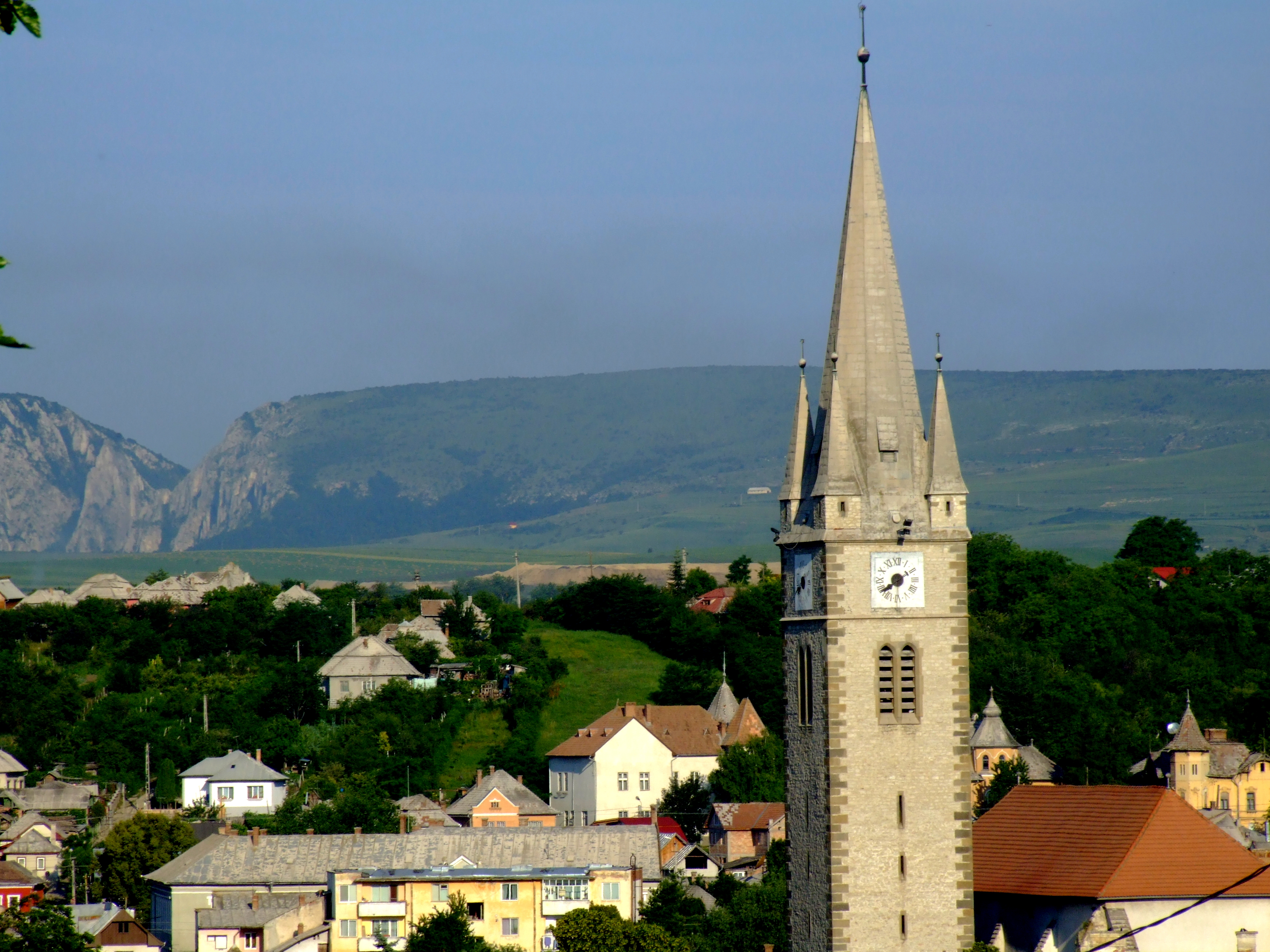
- Republicii Square Salina Turda Turda History Museum Roman Catholic Church of Turda Old Reformed Church of Turda with Turda Gorge in the background

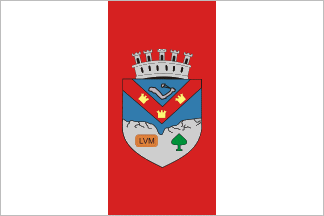
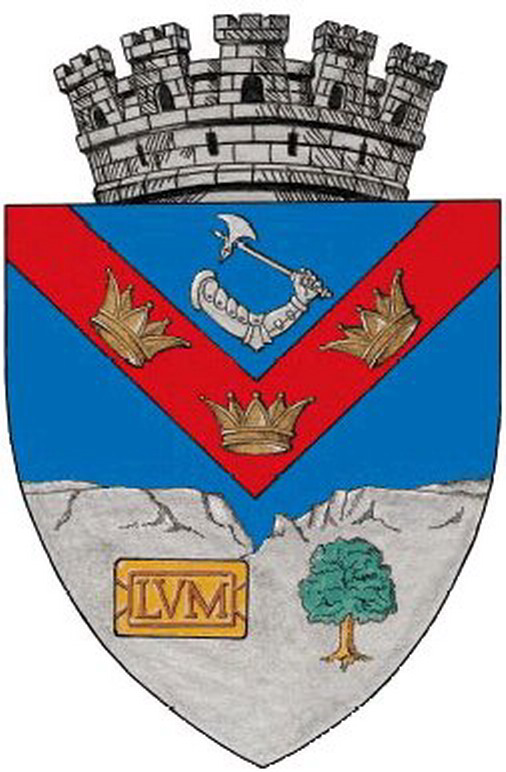
- Flag Coat of arms

- Location in Cluj County

- Location in Romania
- Coordinates: 46°34′8″N 23°47′8″E
- Country: Romania
- County: Cluj

Government
  - Mayor (2024–2028): Cristian-Octavian Matei (PNL)
- Area: 91.43 km^{2} (35.30 sq mi)
- Elevation: 315 m (1,033 ft)
- Highest elevation: 436 m (1,430 ft)
- Lowest elevation: 310 m (1,020 ft)
- Population (2021-12-01): 43,319
  - Density: 473.8/km^{2} (1,227/sq mi)
- Time zone: UTC+02:00 (EET)
  - Summer (DST): UTC+03:00 (EEST)
- Postal code: 401001–401189
- Area code: +(40) x64
- Vehicle reg.: CJ
- Website: primariaturda.ro

Turda (Romanian pronunciation: [ˈturda]; Hungarian: Torda, Hungarian pronunciation: [ˈtorda]; German: Thorenburg; Latin: Potaissa) is a city in Cluj County, Transylvania, Romania. It is located in the southeastern part of the county, 34.2 km (21.3 mi) from the county seat, Cluj-Napoca, to which it is connected by the European route E81, and 6.7 km (4.2 mi) from nearby Câmpia Turzii.

The city consists of four neighborhoods: Turda Veche, Turda Nouă, Oprișani (former Cristiș), and Poiana. It is traversed from west to east by the Arieș River and north to south by its tributary, Valea Racilor.

== History ==
=== Ancient times ===
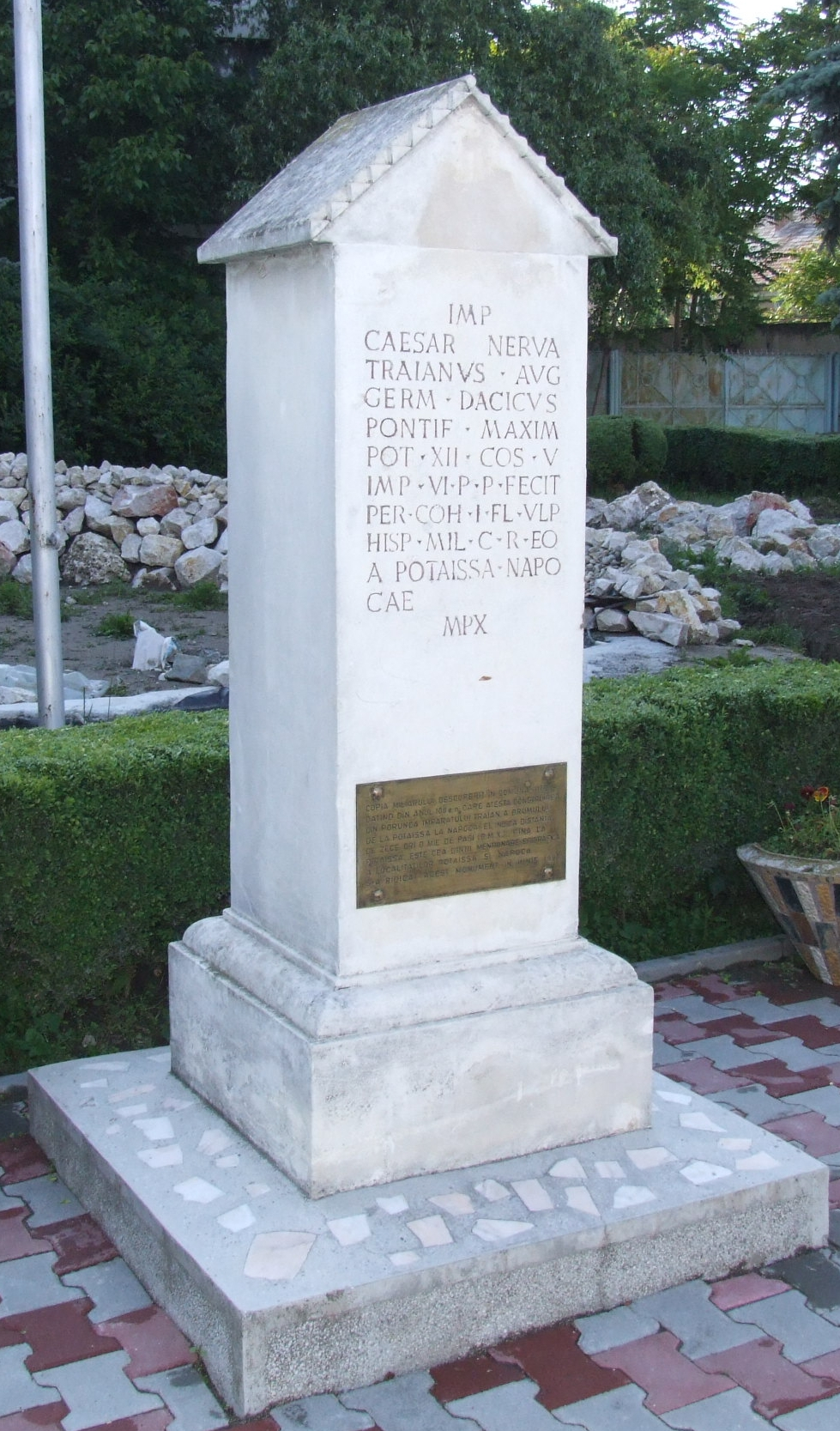
Milliarium of Aiton, the oldest known epigraphical attestation of Potaissa – a copy erected in June 1993 in front of the Turda Post Office

There is evidence of human settlement in the area dating to the Middle Paleolithic, some 60,000 years ago. The Potaissa salt mines were worked in the area since prehistoric times.

The Dacians established a town that Ptolemy in his Geography calls Patreuissa, which is probably a corruption of Patavissa or Potaissa, the latter being more common. It was conquered by the Romans, who kept the name Potaissa, between AD 101 and 106, during the rule of Trajan, together with parts of Decebal's Dacia. "Potaissa" is first recorded on a Roman milliarium discovered in 1758 in the nearby Aiton commune. The city became a municipium Septimium, and benefited from Ius Italicum, however if it reached the rank of colonia is uncertain. At its height it housed as many as 20,000 people. About 200 inscriptions were recovered from the now entirely overlapped Roman ruins, many showing vulgarisms such as v/b alternation or simplification of the geminates.

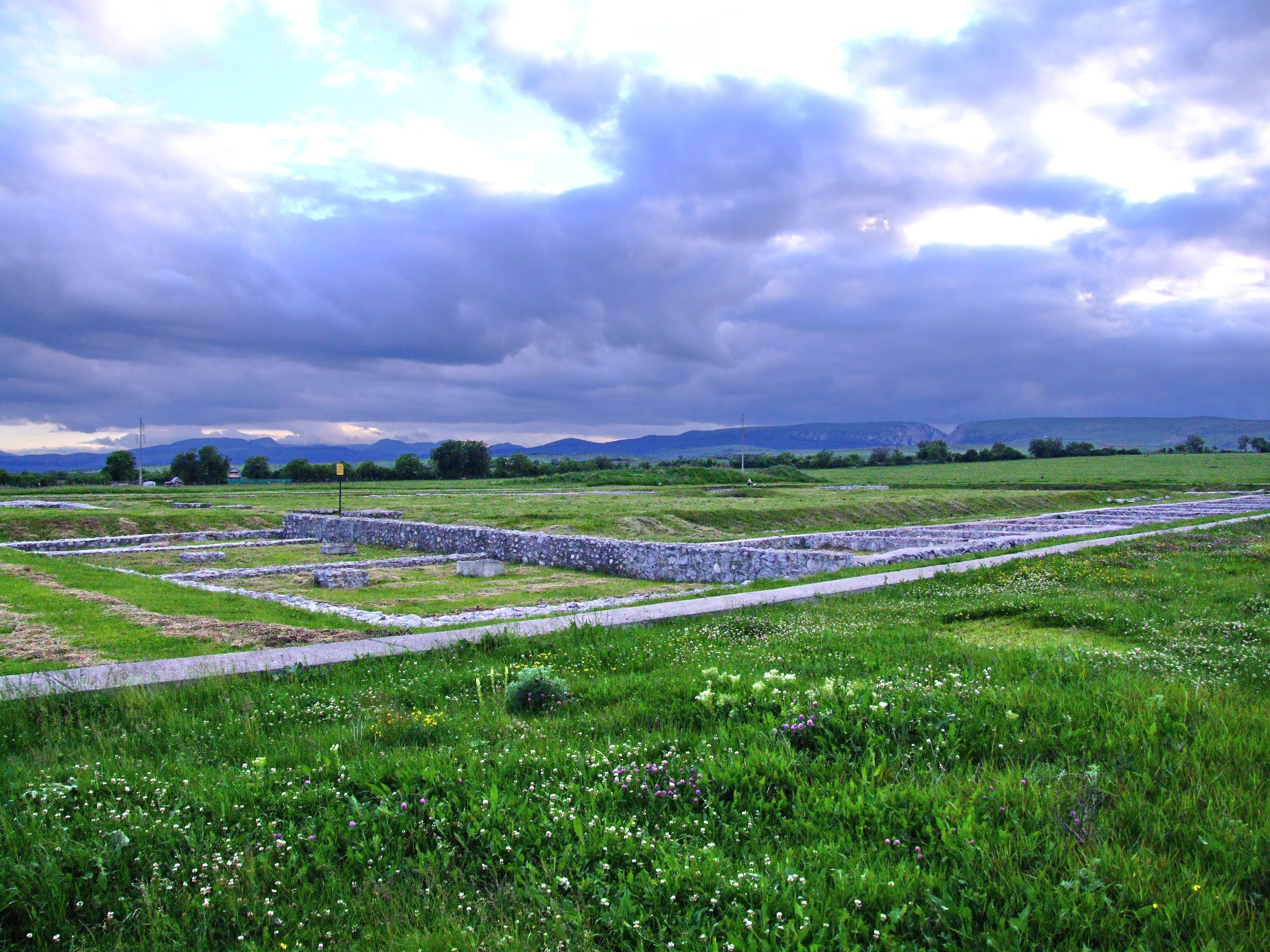
Roman bath at Castra Potaissa

The legionary fortress was established as the basecamp of the Legio V Macedonica from 166 to 274, and was also named Potaissa.

From the reign of Gordian III (238–244) numerous treasures were excavated from Turda, Țaga, Viișoara, and Mărtinești, showing that in this time the defense was breaking under the Carps, Goths, Gepids, and Vandals.

Objects dated to post-Aurelian retreat found at the site (for example an inscribed onyx gem depicting the Good Shepherd, and silver coins of Diocletian) together with a large burial containing sarcophagi and a cremation stone box point at continuous habitation until the early fifth century. The situation changes in the next two centuries when dwellings and cemeteries superpose the Roman site, in a similar manner to Apulum and Sirmium. After conquering the place, the Huns settled down near. From this time three solidus were found from graves. Burying with coins was a Gepid tradition not typical of the Huns, meaning that they settled their vassals in Transylvania too.

=== Middle Age and Early Modern Era ===
The territory changed hands between the Gepids and Langobards multiple times before both were expelled by the Avars.

After the Hungarian conquest, the kindred Kalocsa settled here. Their center was called Tordavár ("castle of Torda"), and another important estate was Tordalaka ("home of Torda") as of 1075. The name probably derives from Old Bulgarian *tvьrdъ meaning citadel, fortress.

Saxons settled in the area in the 12th century. Much of the town was destroyed during the Tatar invasion in 1241–1242, however most of its inhabitants survived by hiding in the cave system. King Stephen V ensured its quick revival by giving privileges.

On January 8, 1288, Ladislaus IV attended the first national assembly in Torda and recruited an army of Transylvanians to repel the Cuman invasion. He pursued the Cumans back to the border. During this time the Hungarians were the absolute majority in the city. Numerous meetings were held here afterwards.

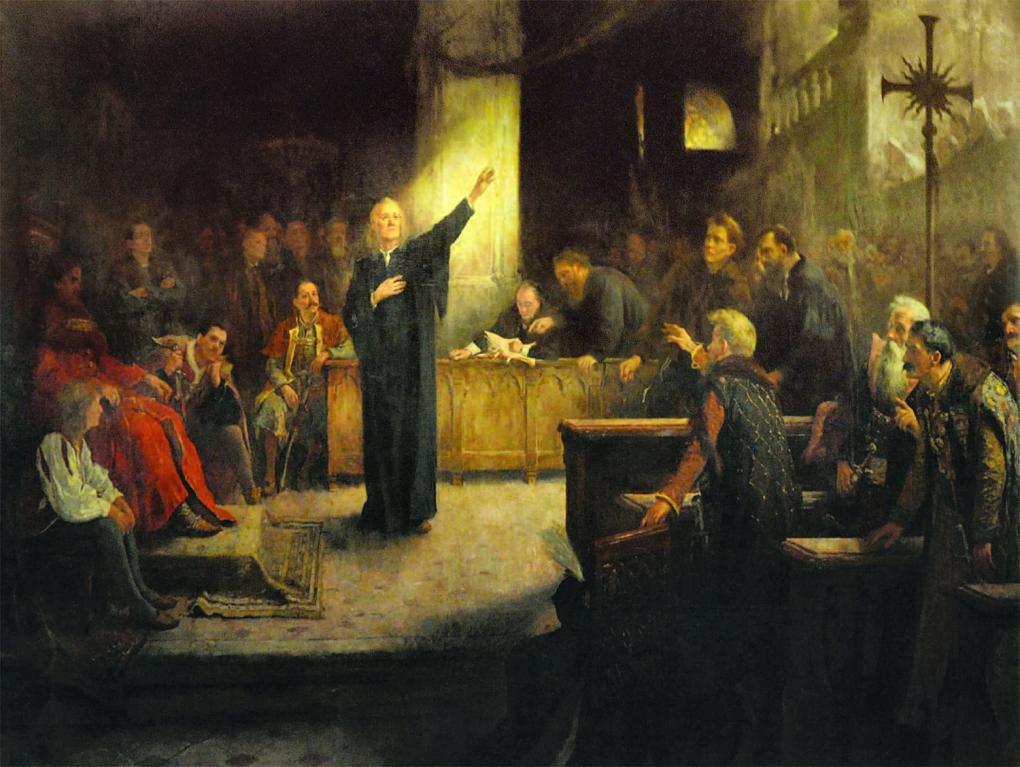
The national assembly of Torda. Painting by Aladár Körösfői-Kriesch

The Hungarian Diet was held in 1467, by Matthias Corvinus. Later, in the 16th century, Turda became the residence of the Transylvanian Diet. After the Battle of Mohács, the city became part of the Eastern Hungarian Kingdom and from 1570, the Principality of Transylvania.

In 1568, the Diet of Torda enacted the Edict of Torda, decreeing religious freedom in Transylvania in the Eastern Hungarian Kingdom, an extraordinary and unprecedented development for its time. Preachers were permitted to "preach the Gospel according to their own understanding", while persecution, imprisonment, and removal from office on religious grounds were prohibited. The first such list, dating from 1595, identified the four recognised religions: Roman Catholicism, Lutheranism, Calvinism and Unitarianism. The laws subsequently referred to the Orthodox religion of the Romanian population as a tolerated religion.

In 1609, Gabriel Báthori granted new privileges to Turda. These were confirmed later by Gabriel Bethlen.

=== Modern times ===
In 1711, the Grand Principality of Transylvania was formed which in 1804, became part of the Austrian Empire. In 1867, by the Austro-Hungarian Compromise, the city became again part of Hungary. After World War I, following the proclamation of the Union of Transylvania with Romania of December 1918 and the Hungarian–Romanian War of 1918–1919, Turda passed under Romanian administration, and then became part of the Kingdom of Romania by the Treaty of Trianon of 1920. During the interwar period, the city became the seat of Turda County. In 1944, the Battle of Turda took place between German and Hungarian forces on one side and Soviet and Romanian forces on the other. It was the largest battle fought in Transylvania during World War II.

== Demographics ==
Historical population
Year	Pop.	±%
1850	8,743	—
1880	10,563	+20.8%
1890	12,370	+17.1%
1900	13,587	+9.8%
1910	15,167	+11.6%
1920	16,692	+10.1%
1930	21,428	+28.4%
1941	32,170	+50.1%
1948	25,905	−19.5%
1956	35,606	+37.4%
1966	44,980	+26.3%
1977	55,294	+22.9%
1992	61,200	+10.7%
2002	55,770	−8.9%
2011	47,744	−14.4%
2021	43,319	−9.3%
Source: Census data

According to the Hungarian census from 1910, the town had 13,455 inhabitants, of which 9,674 were Hungarians, 3,389 Romanians, and 100 Germans.

According to the 2011 Romanian census, there were 47,744 people living within the city. Of this population, 84.7% were ethnic Romanians, while 8.98% were ethnic Hungarians, 6.03% ethnic Roma, and 0.4% others.

At the 2021 census, Turda had a population of 43,319, a decrease of 9.3% from the previous census; of those, 72.46% were Romanians, 5.92% Hungarians, and 4.03% Roma.

== Notable people ==
- János Abacs
- Ádám Anavi
- Dan Anca
- István Bajusz
- Dezső Baróti
- István Barra
- Eta Boeriu
- Miklós Bogáthi Fazekas
- Andreea Cacovean
- Horia Crișan
- Radu Crișan
- Elek Csetri
- László Darkó
- Emilian Dolha
- Veronica Drăgan
- Moise Dragoș
- Arnold Gross
- Étienne Hajdú
- Miklós Jósika
- Eugen Kessler
- Erzsébet Keszy-Harmath
- Baruch Kimmerling
- Sámuel Köteles
- László Kőváry
- Ottó Kőváry
- Csaba Lászlóffy
- Aladár Lászlóffy
- Andrei Mureșan
- Ionuț Mureșan
- Camil Mureșanu
- Mona Muscă
- Albert Nagy
- Ecaterina Orb-Lazăr
- Cristina Pîrv
- Ion Rațiu
- Alin Rus
- Septimiu Sever
- Júlia Sigmond
- Katalin Simonffy
- Zoltán Tibor Sinka
- Ion Suru
- Etelka Szabó Adorján
- Sándor Szenyei
- Miklós Szigethy Csehi
- Rareș Takács
- Mădălina Tătar
- Zoltán Tatár
- János Thordai
- Cosmin Tilincă
- István Timár-Geng
- Gábor Tőrös
- Samu Tóth
- Luminița Trombițaș
- János Tulogdy
- Mária Újvári
- Béla Varga
- Moise Vass
- Cosmin Vâtcă
- Károly Viski

== Tourism ==
- Salina Turda
- Cheile Turzii

== See also ==
- Decree of Turda
- Universitas Valachorum
- List of Transylvanian Saxon localities
- Ancient history of Transylvania, History of Transylvania
- Franziska Tesaurus
- Edict of Torda

== International relations ==
=== Twin towns – sister cities ===
Turda is twinned with:

- (France) Angoulême
- (Hungary) Hódmezővásárhely
- (Spain) Santa Susanna
- (Serbia) Torda

== Picture gallery ==
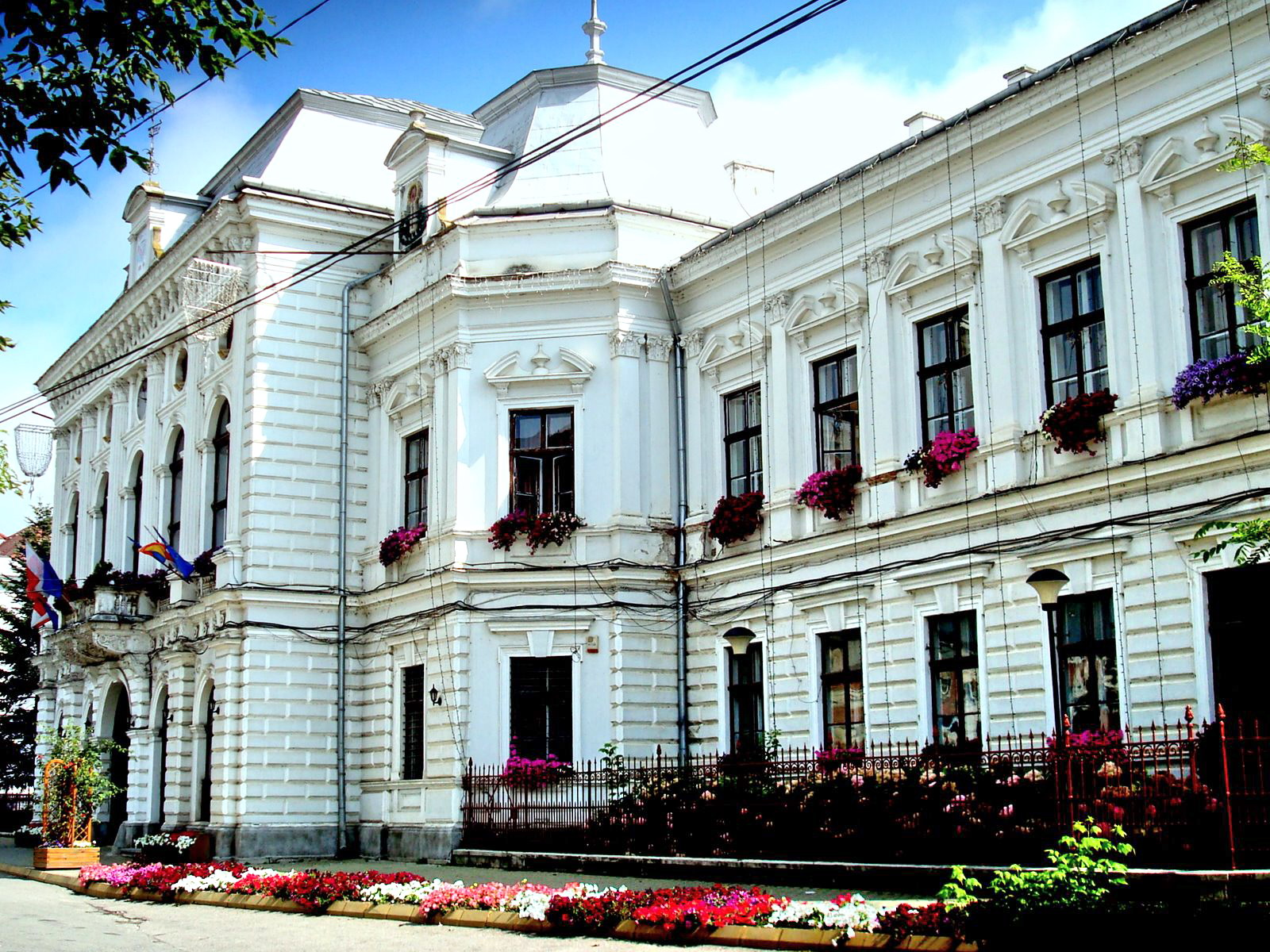
City Hall

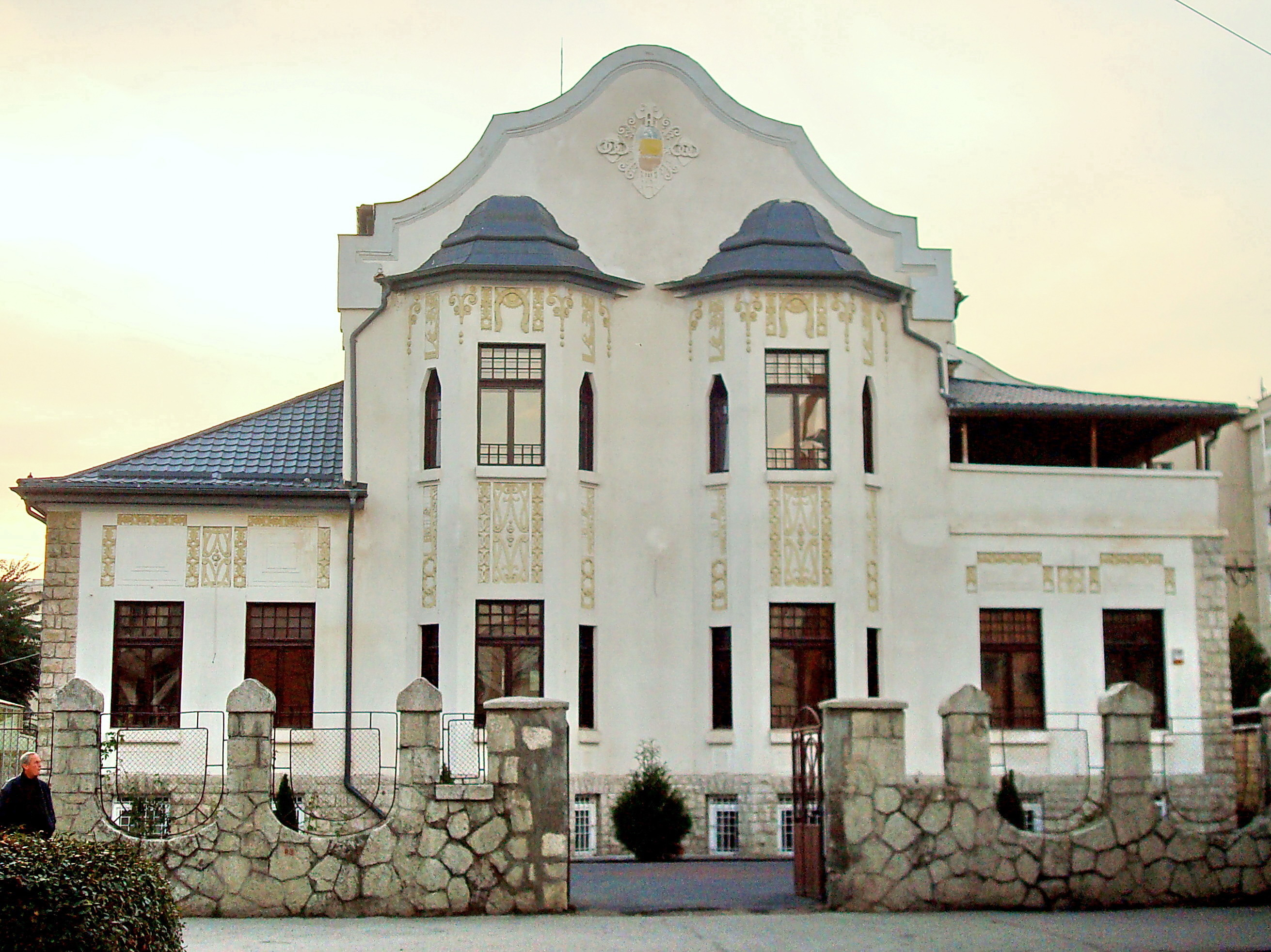
Mendel Villa

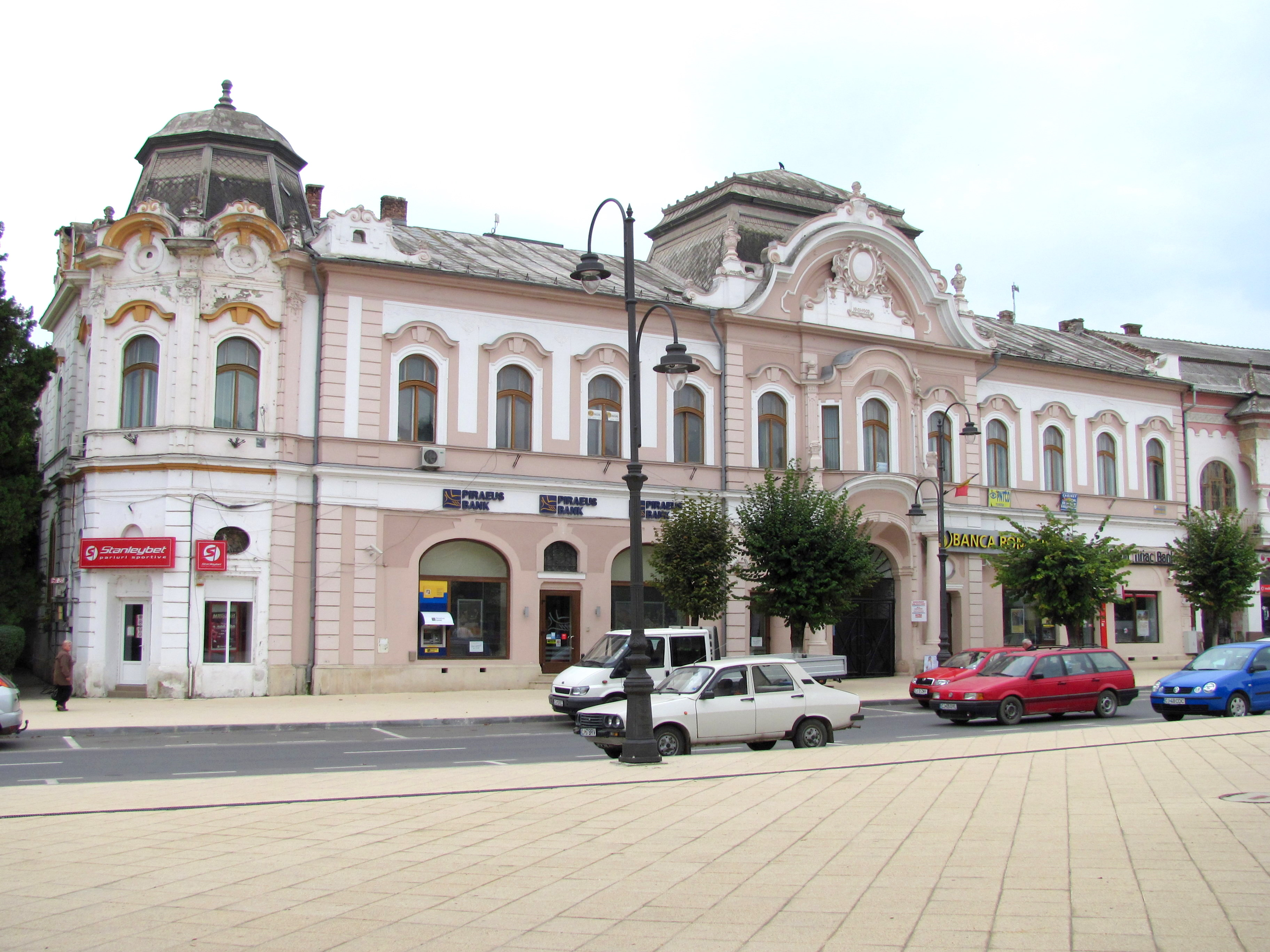
Palace of Finance

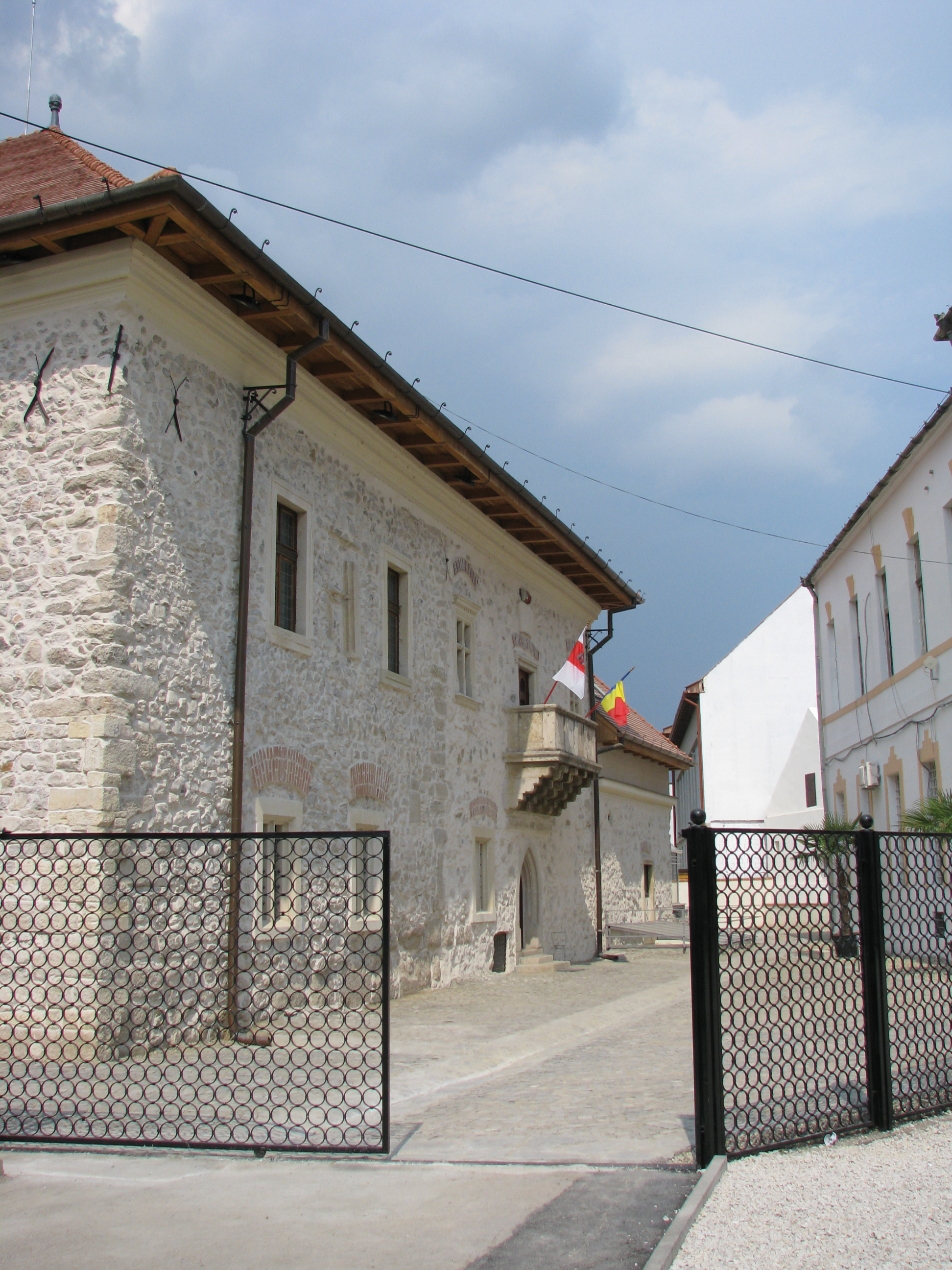
Princely Palace, now the History Museum

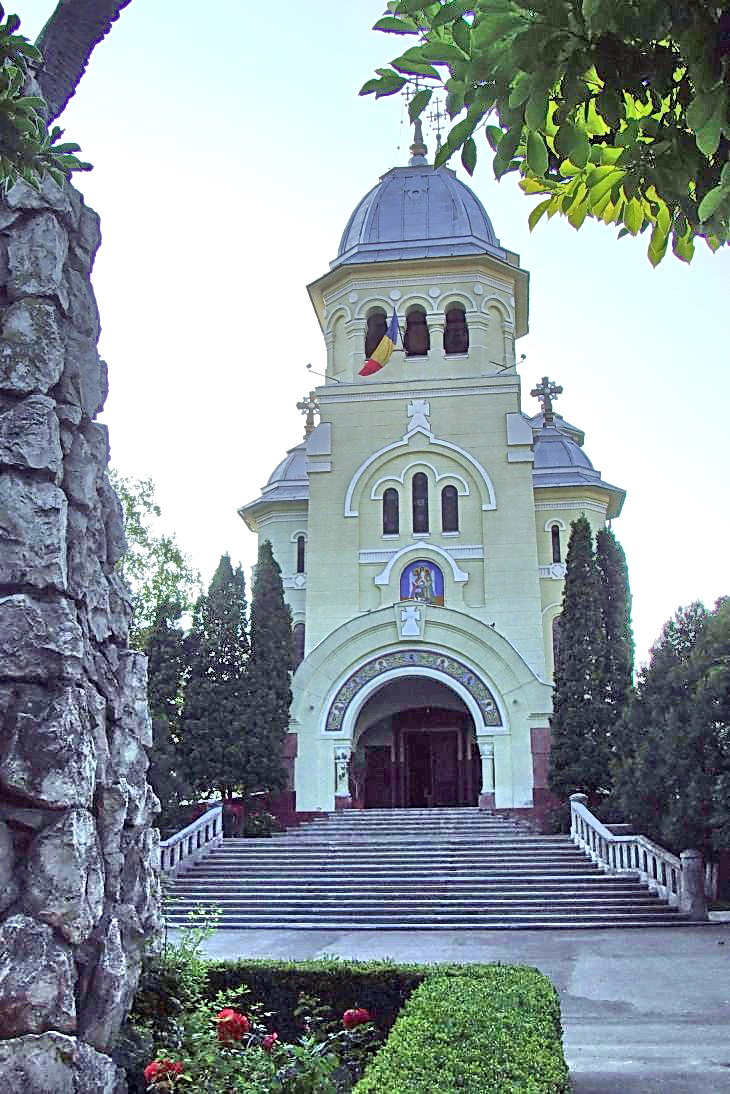
Orthodox Cathedral

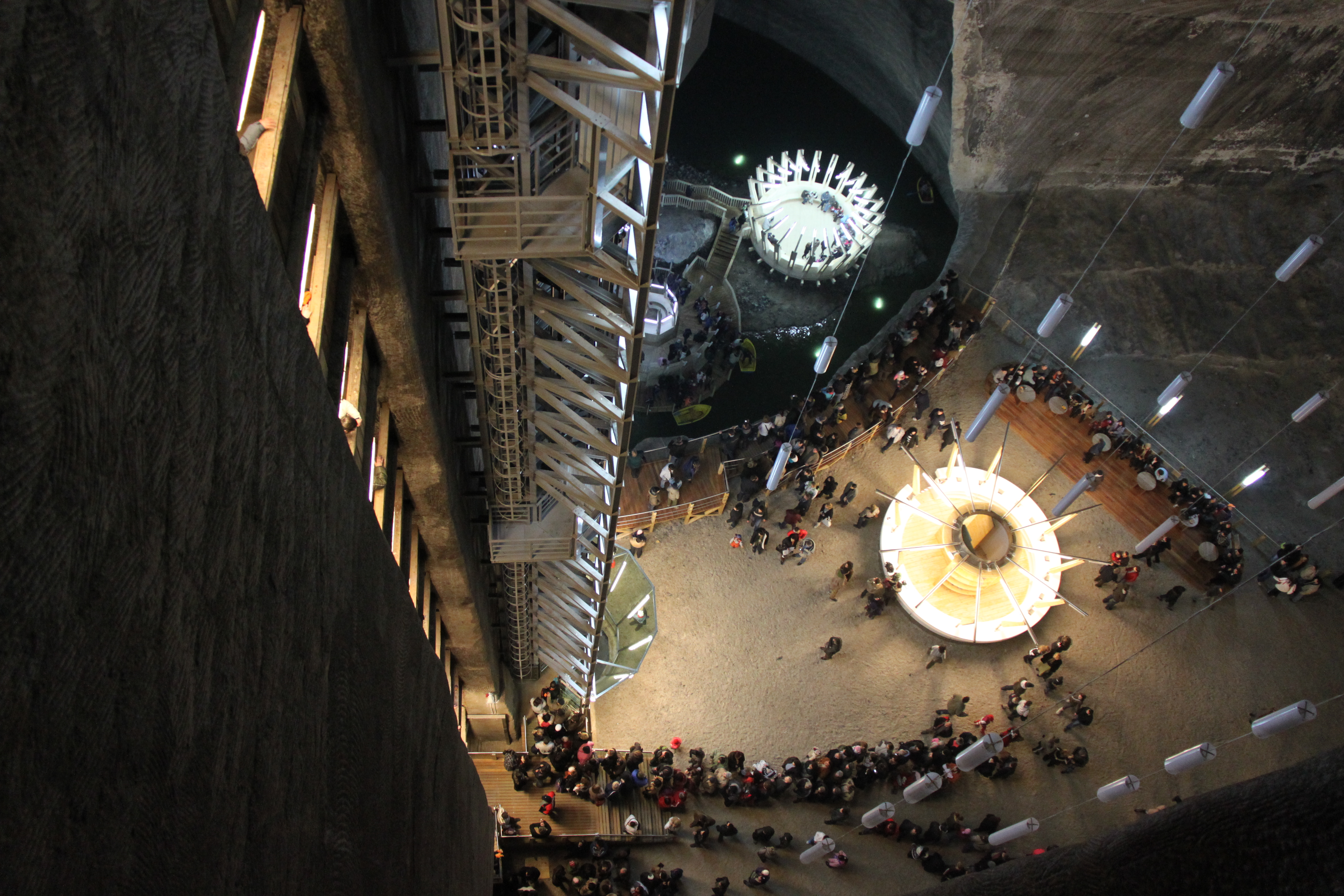
Turda salt mine
