= Andrei Mureșanu High School =

- Liceul "Andrei Mureșanu" Brașov

Location
- Strada Bisericii Sfântul Nicolae, Nr. 1 Brașov, Brașov County, Romania 500112
- Coordinates: 45°38′10.1″N 25°34′57.5″E

Information
- Funding type: Public
- Principal: Anda-Gabriela Hudiță
- Language: Romanian
- Website: www.liceulandreimuresanu.ro

Andrei Mureșanu High School (Romanian: Liceul "Andrei Mureșanu" Brașov) is a high school located at 1 Saint Nicholas Church Street in the Șcheii Brașovului neighborhood of Brașov, Romania. It is situated close to Piața Unirii and the Saint Nicholas Church. The school is named after the well-known Romanian poet Andrei Mureșanu, who composed the lyrics of the national anthem of Romania, "Deșteaptă-te, române!"

The school complex also includes an elementary and a middle school; both are situated in a nearby building.
