= Becaș, Cluj-Napoca =

Becaș
- District
- Interactive map of Becaș
- Coordinates: 46.75°N 23.6°E
- Country: Romania
- County: Cluj
- City: Cluj-Napoca
- Recognized as district: 2005
- Time zone: UTC+2 (EET)
  - Summer (DST): UTC+3 (EEST)

Becaș (Hungarian: Békás-negyed) is a district in the southeastern part of Cluj-Napoca, Romania. Recognized as part of the city’s expansion in the early 2000s, Becaș has developed into a primarily residential area. The district is traversed by the Becaș, along which the city plans to develop a 10.7-hectare park to improve local green space and ecological corridors. In 2024, local authorities announced the construction of a new school in the district. Becaș is also listed among the Cluj districts targeted for future public investment and urban development.
