= Valea Lată =

- Location within Romania

Location
- Country: Romania
- Counties: Cluj County
- Villages: Strucut, Dosu Napului, Andici, Morțești, Viișoara

Physical characteristics
- Mouth: Valea Largă
  - location: Viișoara
  - coordinates: 46.5632°N 23.9120°E
- Length: 16 km (9.9 mi)
- Basin size: 52 km^{2} (20 sq mi)

Basin features
- Progression: Valea Largă→ Arieș→ Mureș→ Tisza→ Danube→ Black Sea

The Valea Lată is a right tributary of the river Valea Largă in Romania. It flows into the Valea Largă in Viișoara. Its length is 16 km (9.9 mi) and its basin size is 52 km^{2} (20 sq mi).
