= Tritul =

- Location within Romania

Location
- Country: Romania
- Counties: Cluj County
- Villages: Tritenii de Sus, Tritenii de Jos, Urca

Physical characteristics
- Mouth: Valea Largă
  - coordinates: 46.5693°N 23.9347°E
- Length: 16 km (9.9 mi)
- Basin size: 56 km^{2} (22 sq mi)

Basin features
- Progression: Valea Largă→ Arieș→ Mureș→ Tisza→ Danube→ Black Sea

The Tritul is a left tributary of the river Valea Largă in Romania. It flows into the Valea Largă near Urca. Its length is 16 km (9.9 mi) and its basin size is 56 km^{2} (22 sq mi).
