= Mihai Viteazul National College =

Mihai Viteazul National College (Romanian: Colegiul Național Mihai Viteazul) may refer to one of five educational institutions in Romania:

- Mihai Viteazul National College (Bucharest)
- Mihai Viteazul National College (Ploiești), in Ploiești, Romania
- Mihai Viteazul National College (Sfântu Gheorghe)
- Mihai Viteazul National College (Slobozia)
- Mihai Viteazul National College (Turda)
