= Valea Largă (Arieș) =

- Location within Romania

Location
- Country: Romania
- Counties: Cluj County
- Villages: Soporu de Câmpie, Ceanu Mare, Viișoara

Physical characteristics
- Mouth: Arieș
  - location: Viișoara
  - coordinates: 46.550°N 23.907°E
- Length: 24 km (15 mi)
- Basin size: 193 km^{2} (75 sq mi)

Basin features
- Progression: Arieș→ Mureș→ Tisza→ Danube→ Black Sea
- Tributaries
  - left: Tritul
  - right: Valea Lată

The Valea Largă is a small river in Cluj County, western Romania. It is a left tributary of the river Arieș. It flows through the municipalities Frata, Ceanu Mare, Tritenii de Jos and Viișoara, and joins the Arieș at Viișoara. It is fed by several smaller streams, including Tritul and Valea Lată. Its length is 24 km (15 mi) and its basin size is 193 km^{2} (75 sq mi).
