= Camil Mureșanu =

Romanian historian and author (1927–2015)

- Born: 20 April 1927; Turda, Kingdom of Romania
- Died: 21 February 2015 (aged 87); Cluj-Napoca, Romania
- Citizenship: Romania
- Education: University of Cluj
- Known for: Historical works; Philosophical works; Political works
- Awards: National Order of Merit, officer rank
- Scientific career
- Fields: History, philosophy, politics, pedagogy
- Workplaces: University of Cluj

Camil Bujor Mureșanu (Romanian pronunciation: [kaˈmil buˈʒor mureˈʃanu]; 20 April 1927 – 21 February 2015) was a Romanian historian, professor and author.

== Biography ==
Mureșanu was born and reared in Turda. He attended the King Ferdinand High School in Turda, where his father, Teodor Murășanu, was a teacher. After 1946, he studied history at the University of Cluj, where he graduated in June 1950. In the summer of 1948, Camil Mureșanu was arrested for political reasons by the communist authorities, without penal sanctions.

He became a teaching assistant, junior teaching assistant (1950–1952), assistant professor (1952–1961), associate professor (1961–1975), and professor (after 1975) at Babeș-Bolyai University. Also, he was the dean of Faculty of History (1968–1976, 1981–1989). He obtained his Ph.D. in history in 1971 with the thesis: Times of John Hunyadi (doctoral adviser Ṣtefan Pascu). He was visiting professor at Columbia University, in New York City (1978). Mureșanu was a doctoral adviser after 1976. He was a researcher at the "George Barițiu" History Institute (after 1975). In 1995, he became the principal of "George Barițiu" History Institute. He was a corresponding member of the Romanian Academy (1990), then member of the Romanian Academy – the History and Archaeology Section (June 2000) and branch chairman of Cluj Romanian Academy (after 2006).

He was a participant at the International Congress of Historical Sciences (Vienna – 1965, Moscow – 1970, Bucharest – 1980, Oslo – 2000). He attended a specialisation at Sorbonne University in Paris (February – June 1966).

He was a correspondent member of the "Süd-ost Europa Gesellschaft", Munich (October 1999), and Berlin (February 26, 2000), as well as a correspondent member of the Pedagogical Academy in Belgrade. He was the co-president of the Romanian-Hungarian mixed history commission.

Camil Mureșanu was a doctor honoris causa of the University of Oradea (December 1, 1999), the West University of Timișoara (March 2002), and the 1 Decembrie 1918 University, Alba Iulia (March 2007). He was an honorary citizen of Cluj-Napoca (February 1997), Turda (June 1997), and Blaj (September 24, 1999). He was a member of General Association of Greek Catholic Romanians.

== Family ==
His grandfather was a priest and his father, Teodor Murășanu, was a Romanian language teacher. His son, Ovidiu Mureșan (born 1951), is a historian at Babeș-Bolyai University.

== Awards ==
- Award of the Romanian Academy (1976)
- The Government of Romania awarded him the National Order of Merit in the rank of officer.

== Works ==
- John Hunyadi. Defender of Christendom. Iași – Oxford – Portland, The Center for Romanian Studies, 2001, 224 p.
- Ioan de Hunedoara și vremea sa, București, Editura Tineretului, 1957, 203 p.
- Revoluția burgheză din Anglia, București 1964
- Erdély története, vol. 2, București 1964, [in collaboration]
- Monumente istorice din Turda, București 1968
- Beziehungen zwischen der rumänischen und sächsischer Forschung im 19. und 20. Jahrhundert, în: Wege landeskundlicher Forschung, Köln-Wien 1988 Siebenbürgisches Archiv, Bd. 21
- Națiune, naționalism. Evoluția naționalităților, Centrul de Studii Transilvane, Cluj 1996
- Focul ocrotit de ape (Revoluția burgheză din Țările de Jos). București, Editura Ştiințifică, 1960, 179 p.
- Din istoria Transilvaniei. Vol 2. București, Editura Academiei, 1961, 462 p.; Ediţia a 2‑a în 1963, 550 p. [in collaboration].
- Lecturi din izvoarele istoriei evului mediu. București, Editura de Stat Didactică si Pedagogică, 1961, 281 p. [in collaboration].
- Istoria României. Vol. 2. București, Editura Academiei, 1962, 1259 p. [in collaboration].
- Erdély története. Vol. 2. București, Editura Academiei, 1964, 558 p. [in collaboration].
- Istoria României. Vol. 4. București, Editura Academiei, 1964, 861 p. [in collaboration].
- Revoluția burgheză din Anglia. București, Editura Ştiinţifică, 1964, 341 p.
- Imperiul Britanic. Scurtă istorie. București, Editura Ştiinţifică, 1967, 502 p.
- Iancu de Hunedoara. Ed. a 2‑a revăzută și adăugită. București, Editura Ştiinţifică, 1968, 245 p.
- Monumente istorice din Turda București, Editura Meridiane, 1968, 32 p.
- Atlas istoric. Coordonator Ștefan Pascu. București, Editura Didactică şi Pedagogică, 1971, 199 p. [in collaboration].
- Culegere de texte pentru istorie universală. Epoca modernă. Vol. l: 1640‑1848. București, Editura Didactică și Pedagogică, 1973, 360 p. [in collaboration].
- Culegere de texte pentru istorie universală. Epoca modernă. Vol. 2 : 1848‑1918. București, Editura Didactică și Pedagogică, 1974, 350 p. [in collaboration].
- Președinte la Casa Albă. București, Editura Politică, 1974, 699 p. [in collaboration].
- Iancu de Hunedoara. București, Editura Militară, 1976, 128 p.
- Atlas pentru istoria României. București, Editura Didactică şi Pedagogică, 1983, 30 p. + 84 h. + 12 pl. + 26 p. index. [in collaboration].
- Simon Bolivar (1783‑1830). București, Editura Politică, 1983, 135 p.
- Downing Street 10. Cluj‑Napoca, "Dacia", 1984, 401 p. [in collaboration].
- Istoria militară a poporului român. Vol. 2. Epoca de glorie a oastei celei mari. A doua jumătate a secolului al XlV‑lea – prima jumătate a secolului al XVI‑lea. București, Editura Militară, 1986, 638 p. [in collaboration].
- Istoria militară a poporului român. Vol. 4. Epoca revoluțiilor de eliberare națională şi socială. De la revoluția populară din 1784 la cucerirea independenței depline 1877–1878. București, Editura Militară, 1987, XII, +1105 p. [in collaboration].
- Bezichungen zwischen der rumänischen und sächsischer Forschung im 19. und 20. Jahrhundert, in Wege landeakundlicher Forschung. Köln und Wien, Böhlau Verlag, 1988, p. 277‑288. (Siebenbürgischen Archiv, Bd. 21).
- Documente privind revoluţia de la 1848 în Țările Române. C. Transilvania. Vol. 4 : 14‑25 mai 1848. București, Editura Academiei, 1988, XLVIII+ 599 p.
- Președinții Franței. Craiova, Universalia Dialog, 1991, 231 p. [in collaboration].
- Momente din istoria Europei. Cluj-Napoca, Universitatea "Babeș-Bolyai", 1996, 293 p.
- Naţiune, naţionalism. Evoluţia naţionalităţilor. Cluj‑Napoca, Centrul de Studii Transilvane. Fundaţia Culturală Română, 1996, 308 p.
- Vieți, fapte, gânduri. Craiova, Editura OMNISCOP, 1996, 198 p.
- Europa modernă. De la Renaștere la sfârșitul de mileniu. Cluj‑Napoca, Editura Dacia, 1997, 126 p.
- Transilvania între medieval și modern. Vol. 1–2. Coordonator ..., Cluj‑Napoca, 1996, 160 p.; 1997, 48 p.
- Revoluţia de la 1848–1849 în Europa Centrală. Perspectivă istorică şi istoriografică. Coordonatori: Camil Mureşanu, Nicolae Bocşan, Ioan Bolovan, Cluj‑Napoca, Editura Presa Universitară Clujeană, 2000, 472 p.
- Istoria românilor. Vol. 4. De la universalitatea creştină către Europa "patriilor". Comitetul de redacție al volumului: acad. Ștefan Ștefănescu și acad. Camil Mureșanu, redactori responsabili, prof. univ. Tudor Teoteoi, secretary, București, Editura Enciclopedică, 2001, 878 p. + pl. + il. [Author al paginilor: 31–54; 338–348; 502–524].
- Istorie şi cunoaştere. Discurs de recepţie la Academia Română, București, Editura Academiei Române, 2002, 20 p.; In: Academica, 2001, 12, nr. 1–2, p. 30-31; MI, 2002, 36, nr. 2, p. 33–38.
- În templul lui Ianus. Studii și gânduri despre trecut și viitor. Cluj‑Napoca, Editura Cartimpex, 2002, 345 p.
- Documenta Romaniae Historica. Series C. Transilvania. Vol. XIV: 1371‑1375. Editura Academiei Române, 2002, 815 p. [Editor]
- Publilius Syrus, Maxime. Text original, traducere din limba latină și note de ..., Cluj-Napoca, Editura Cartimpex, 2002, 104 p.
- Ioan Lupaș, Scrieri istorice alese. Vol. 2. Studii privind istoria modernă și istoria istoriografiei. Ediție îngrijită de..., București, Editura Academiei Române, 2007, 525 p.

== Doctoral advisor ==
- Ovidiu Achim, Rolul Tribunei și tribunismului în mișcarea națională și culturală ardelenă la sfârșitul secolului al XIX-lea (1995)
- Minerva Lovin, Emigrația românească din Transilvania în Canada în 1920 (1997)
- Teodora Daniela Sechel, Politica sanitară promovată de Habsburgi în Transilvania între 1740–1835. Disciplina socială impusă de authorități ca oconsecință an acestei politici de reformă (1999)
- Demetra Marica Gui, Interferențe franceze în pictura modernă românească (de la Grigorescu la Tonitza) (2002)
- Daciana Marinescu, Interferențe în evoluția învățământului pedagogic și teologic Arădean (1812–1877) (2002)
- Ovidiu Munteanu, Imaginea poporului român și a Țărilor Române în mediul cultural-politic francez 1829–1859 (2002)
- Cosmin Lucian Seman, Ioan Micu Moldovan (1833–1915). Monografie istorica. (2004)
- Vasile Florin Mirgheșiu, Vasile Stoica - gânditor politic şi diplomat (2004)

== Bibliography ==
- Națiune și europenitate. Studii istorice. In honorem magistri Camilli Mureşanu, București, Editura Academiei Române, 2007, XXXV + 467 p.
- Professor Camil Mureșanu at His 75th Anniversary (Cluj, 1997)
- Bio-Bibliography of Prof. Dr. Camil Mureșanu, member-correspondent of the Romanian Academy, on the occasion of his 70th anniversary. Introduction by Nicolae Edroiu. The bibliography of Prof. Dr. Camil Mureșanu's work, (1955–1997) written by Maria Pagu and Karolyi Iolanda, Cluj-Napoca, 1997, 68 p.
- Cristian Colceriu, Noblețea profesiei- Funcția integratoare a istoricului, in Elite Clujene Contemporane Cluj Contemporary Elites, Academia Româna - Centrul de Studii Transilvane, vol.I, Ed. Clear Vison, Cluj Napoca, 2009
