= Emil Giurgiuca =

Austro-Hungarian-born Romanian poet

Emil Giurgiuca (December 27, 1906–March 3, 1992) was an Austro-Hungarian-born Romanian poet.

== Biography ==
Born in Diviciorii Mari, Cluj County, in the Transylvania region, his parents were Ioan Giurgiuca, a priest, and his wife Pelaghia (née Băieșu). He attended high school in Gherla from 1918 to 1923, followed by the literature and philosophy faculty of the University of Bucharest from 1925 to 1929. He taught high school at Aiud (1929–1931), Uioara (1931–1933), Brad (1933–1934), Cluj (1934–1936; 1939–1940), Sighișoara (1936–1939) and Bucharest (1949–1965). From 1933 to 1934, he headed Abecedar magazine in Brad, at first with George Boldea and later with Teodor Murășanu, Pavel Dan, Mihai Beniuc, and Grigore Popa. He also worked as an adviser at Editura Miron Neagu in Sighișoara and from 1965 to 1970 was editor-in-chief of Colocvii magazine.

Giurgiuca made his published debut in 1925, shortly after high school, with poems in the style of George Coșbuc, Ștefan Octavian Iosif, and Octavian Goga that appeared in the Turnu Severin magazine Datina. His work also appeared in Universul literar, the Aiud România literară, Țara noastră, Gândirea, Gând românesc, Tribuna, Gazeta literară and România Literară. His first book was the 1938 Anotimpuri, followed by Dincolo de pădure in 1943; both were typical of Transylvanian poetry imbued with nostalgia for the village and for nature. Distraught by Romania's loss of Northern Transylvania in 1940, he set down protests in verse. He was marginalized during the first phase of the Communist regime, and did not publish for over two decades, either because he was not allowed to do so or because he had no wish to practice socialist realism. Poemele verii (1964), Cântece de țară (1967), and Semne pe scurt (1972) were the final three volumes of a poet focused on the euphoria of the sun and elegiac contemplation. Poeme, an anthology that included a few unpublished verses, appeared in 1989.

He put together two anthologies of other authors, Poeți tineri ardeleni (1940) and Transilvania în poezia românească (1943). Giurgiuca translated numerous Hungarian authors, including Zsigmond Móricz, Kálmán Mikszáth, Géza Gárdonyi, István Örkény, and József Darvas. A first monographic study about Giurgiuca appeared in 2006, the centenary of his birth, followed by a second in 2013. In addition, a centenary anthology appeared at Brad in 2006.
