= Ciurgău =

Ciurgău may refer to several places in Romania:

- Ciurgău, a village in Ceanu Mare Commune, Cluj County
- Ciurgău, a village in Luduș town, Mureș County
