= Jenő Gyárfás =

Hungarian painter (1857–1925)

Self-portraits

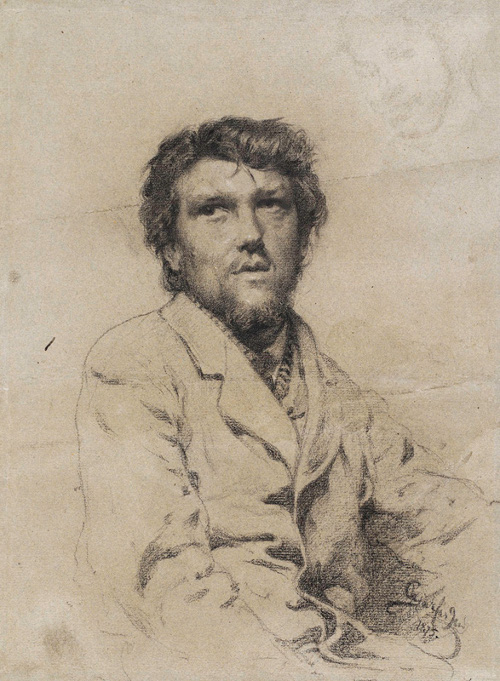
1875, 18 years old

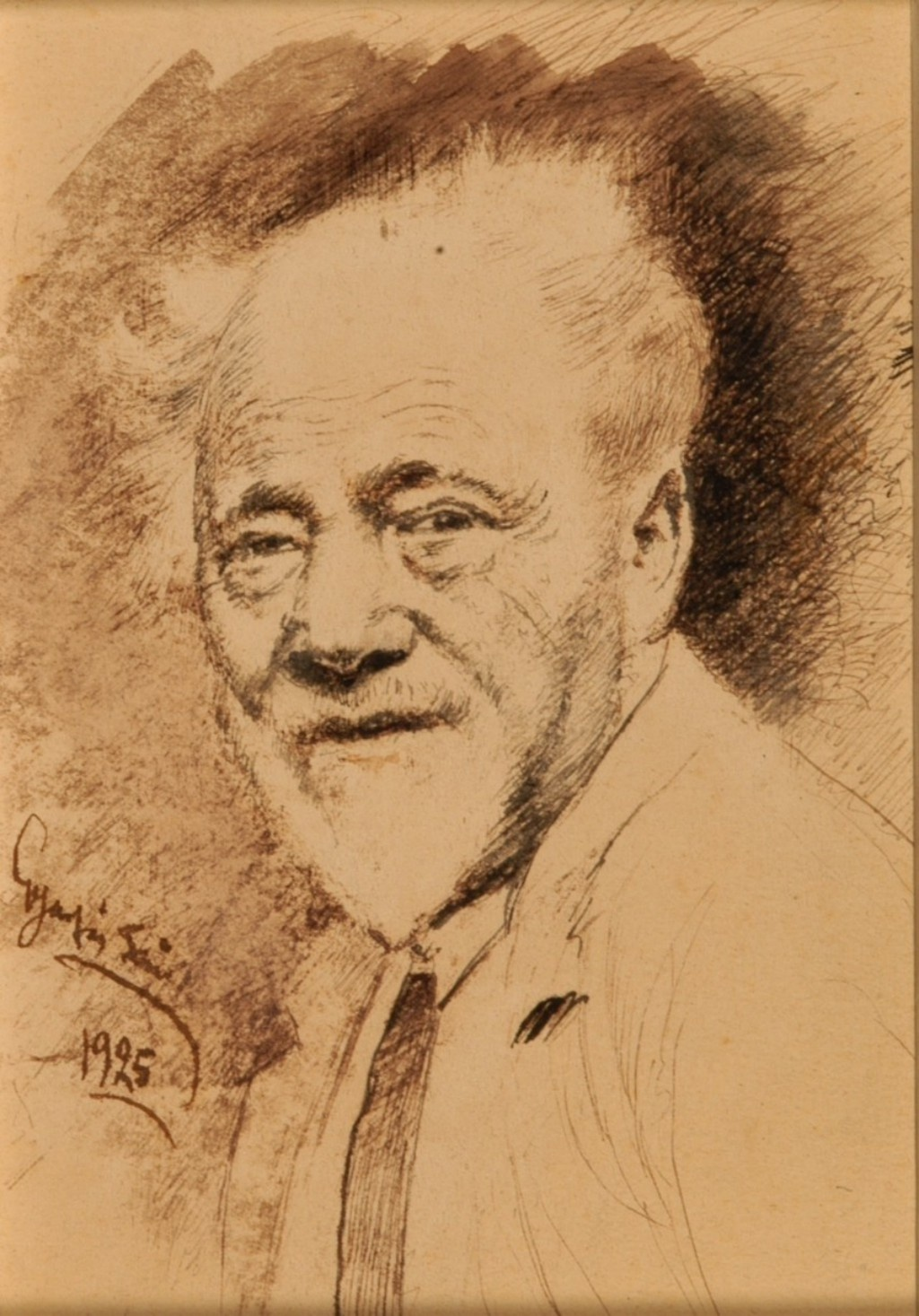
1925, 68 years old

Jenő Gyárfás (6 April 1857, in Sepsiszentgyörgy – 3 December 1925, in Sepsiszentgyörgy, renamed Sfântu Gheorghe) was a Hungarian portrait painter, graphic artist and writer.

== Biography ==
From 1873 to 1877, he studied at the newly created Hungarian Royal Drawing School in Budapest, under the history painter Bertalan Székely. He continued his studies at the Academy of Fine Arts, Munich with Alexander von Wagner, Gabriel von Max and Wilhelm von Diez.

He soon decided that he would like to specialize in paintings of figures and portraits, beginning with his fellow student, Bertalan Karlovszky. His paintings of Vienna, Budapest and Munich were praised, but failed to attract buyers or patrons, so he supported himself by creating illustrations for the local magazines.

In 1882, he was awarded a state scholarship to study in Italy, but remained for only a short time, taking a position as an art teacher in Sepsiszentgyörgy. Once there, he found himself isolated from all of the contemporary trends in painting, although he continued to do the same sort of work he had done in Munich. In 1896, as part of the "Hungarian Millennium Celebrations", he produced a canvas of King Ladislaus V, swearing an oath not to retaliate against László Hunyadi.

He wrote odes, romances and ballads which he illustrated himself, although apparently none of them are currently available. During this time, he also participated in illustrating The Austro-Hungarian Monarchy in Word and Picture, known as the "Kronprinzenwerk" for short; a 24-volume encyclopedia overseen by Crown Prince Rudolf. He remained in his hometown after it became part of Romania in 1920, but his work suffered due to the effects of an eye disease and unspecified family problems. His former studio there now houses a small museum and exhibition hall, named after him.

== Selected paintings ==
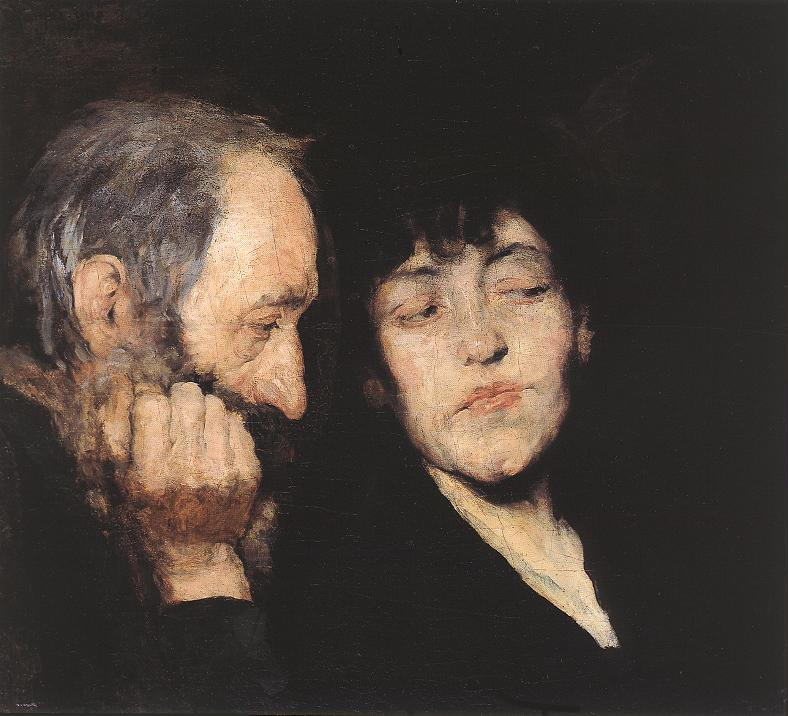
Youth and Age (1887)

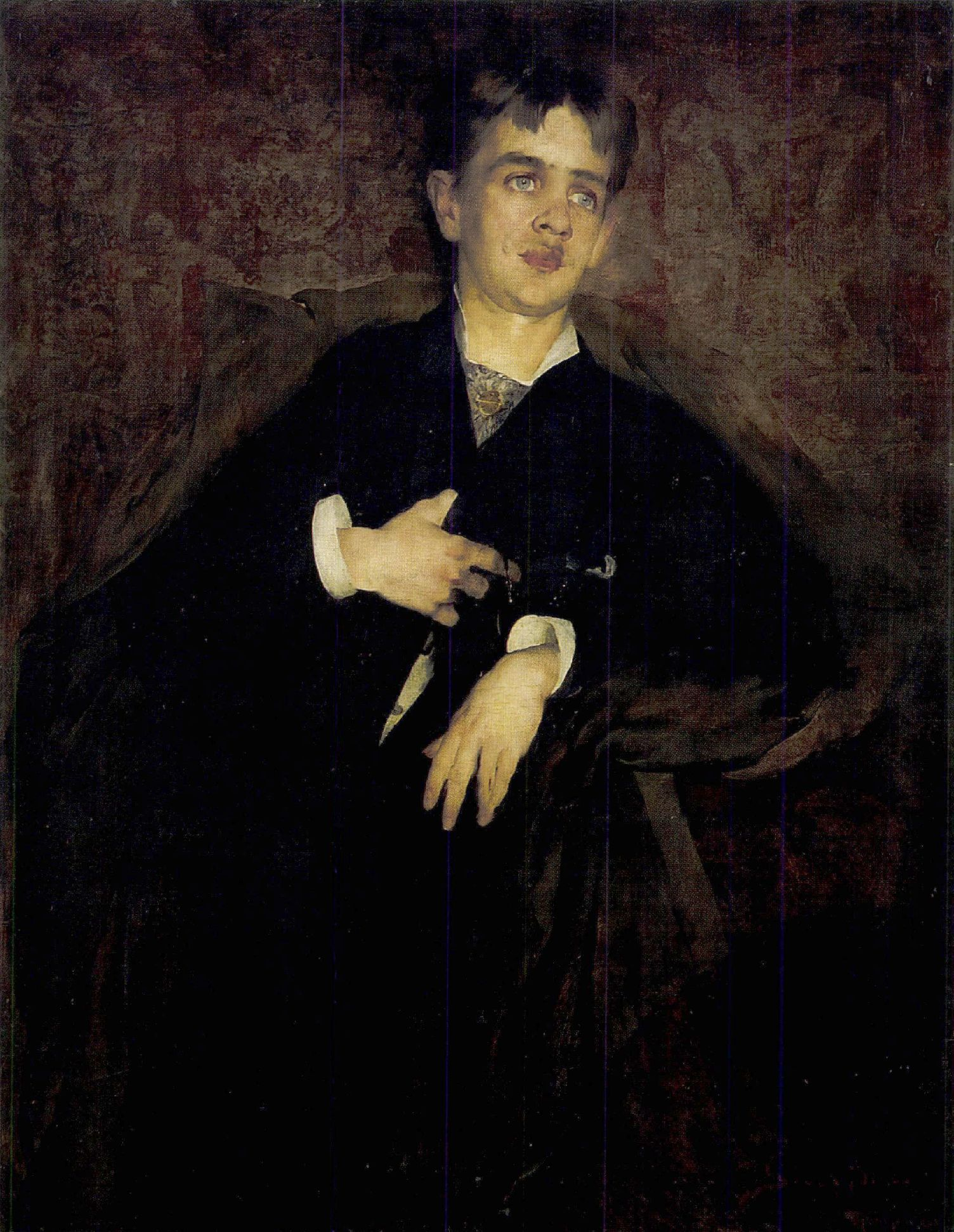
Portrait of Bertalan Karlovszky (1880)

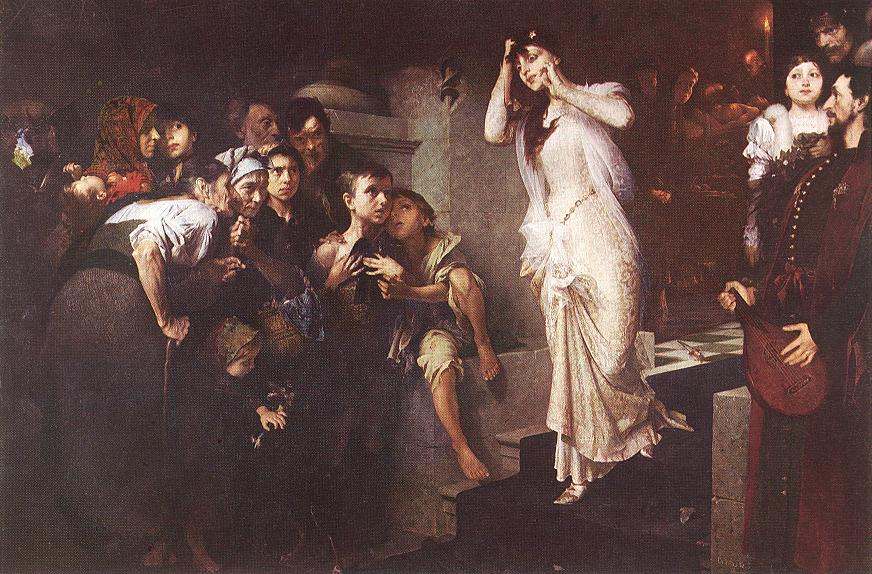
The Ordeal of the Bier (1881), a scene from a ballad by János Arany

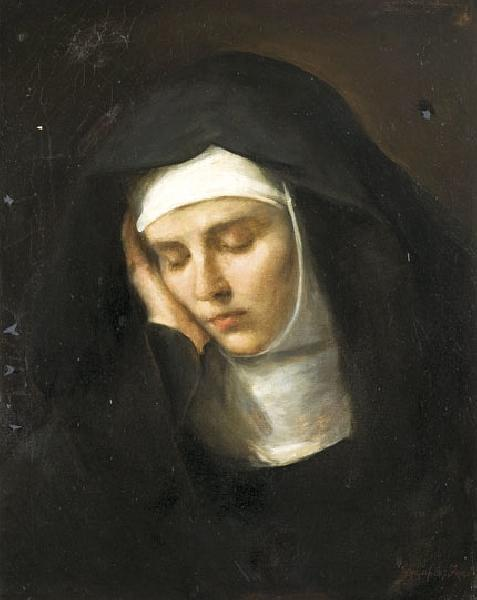
Piety (date unknown)
