= Giurgiuca =

Giurgiuca is a Romanian surname. Notable people with the surname include:

- Dorin Giurgiuca (1944–2013), Romanian table tennis player and coach
- Emil Giurgiuca (1906–1992), Romanian poet
