= Unirea (newspaper) =

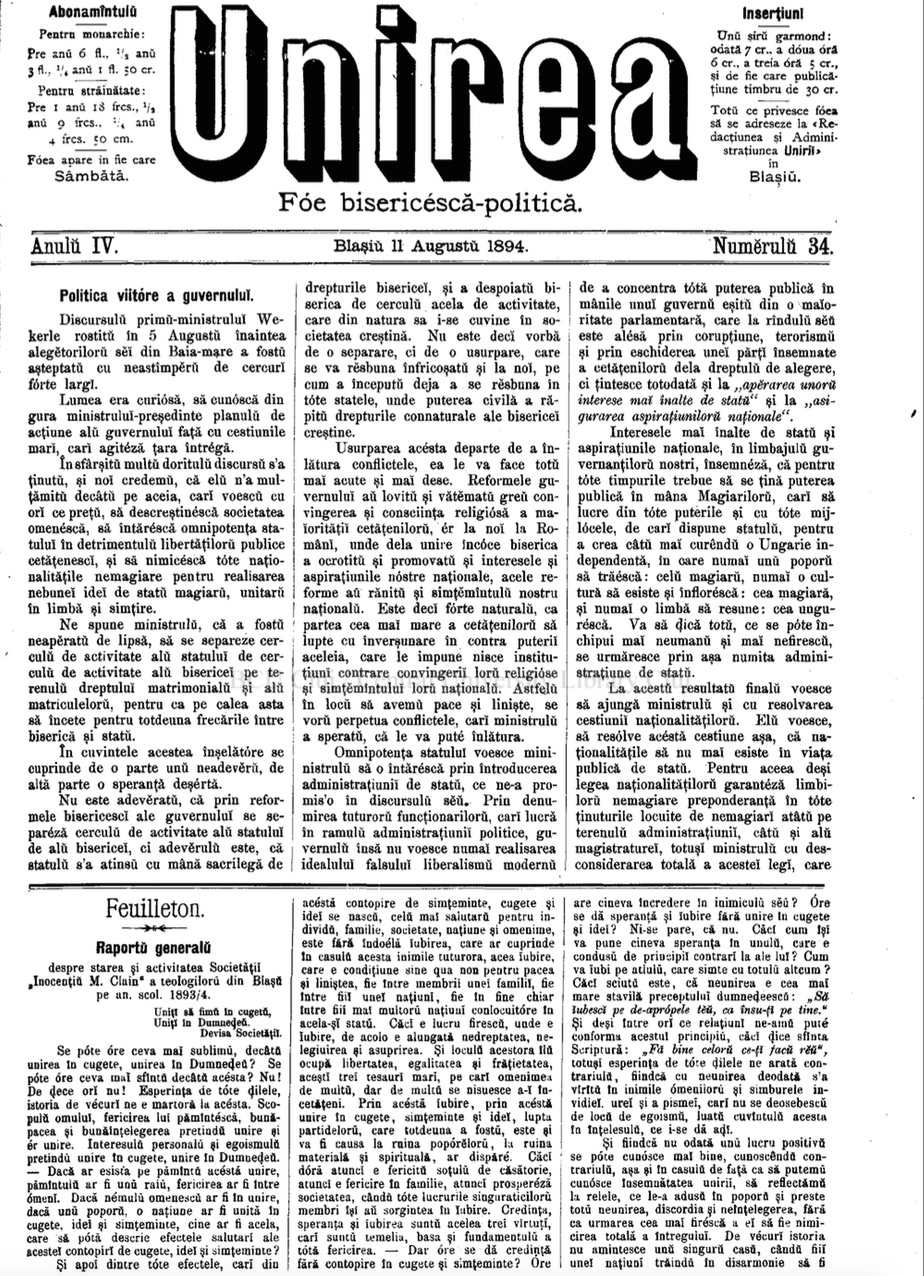
Front page of Unirea for August 11, 1894

Unirea ("The Union") was a newspaper published at Blaj, in the Transylvania region, which was administered by the Kingdom of Hungary and eventually became part of Romania in 1920. Appearing between January 3, 1891, and March 24, 1945, it was an official publication of the Romanian Greek-Catholic Church.

The newspaper's initial editor was Bishop Vasile Hossu. Taking a stance against Junimea and its magazine Convorbiri Literare in the months following its January 1891 establishment, Unirea featured a series of critical articles about Mihai Eminescu, authored by the priest Alexandru Grama. The newspaper published poems, including by Ion Agârbiceanu, who made his debut there with Amintiri in 1899. Elena din Ardeal and Ion Pop-Reteganul numbered among its prose fiction contributors. In 1899, a study on the works of Andrei Mureșanu appeared; in addition, a review of George Coșbuc's poetry was published the same year. Verses by Octavian Goga, Lucian Blaga, Iustin Ilieșiu and Teodor Murășanu all ran in the newspaper's pages. Translations it featured include François-René de Chateaubriand's Atala, poems by Friedrich Wilhelm Weber and humorous prose from French, Italian, Spanish and English literature. Shortly before its demise, it published documents relating to the 1944 Romanian coup d'état.

Although belonging to the church and receiving an important part of its contributions from Greek-Catholic clerics and teachers at the local Romanian schools, Unirea, which billed itself as a "churchly-political broadsheet", avoided an excessive focus on theological and religious themes. Its editors instead preferred to discuss political matters, as well as the status of Transylvania's Romanians. This orientation was particularly visible in late autumn 1918, in the period leading up to the union of Transylvania with Romania. Traditionally, the paper had been published in a weekly four-page edition, but an early November copy was written in red ink to emphasize its festive character. The occasion it celebrated was the recent establishment at Blaj of a Romanian National Council and National Guard, both of which held sway over Alsó-Fehér County. On November 28, the front page called Romanians to Alba Iulia, to the assembly that would ratify the union. Into 1919, the newspaper continued as a daily propagandistic organ; taken over by the National Council, its director was Alexandru Ciura. This period marked its apogee; it subsequently split into two publications, with the churchly-religious section continuing as Unirea, while the lay part was called Unirea poporului.

Unirea was shut down by the new Romanian Communist Party-dominated government, which viewed the newspaper unfavorably, in March 1945. A newspaper with the same name was set up at Alba Iulia in 1967.
