= Zsombor Veress =

Romanian footballer

Personal information
- Date of birth: 24 December 1999 (age 26)
- Place of birth: Sfântu Gheorghe, Romania
- Height: 1.84 m (6 ft 0 in)
- Position: Forward

Team information
- Current team: Putnok

Youth career
- 2011–2016: Sepsi OSK

Senior career*
Years	Team	Apps	(Gls)
2016–2022	Sepsi OSK	10	(0)
2019	→ KSE Târgu Secuiesc (loan)		
2019	→ Mosonmagyaróvár (loan)	9	(0)
2020–2022	→ Sepsi OSK II (loan)		
2022–	Putnok	3	(1)
- * Club domestic league appearances and goals as of 14 August 2022

Zsombor Veress (born 24 December 1999) is a Romanian professional footballer who plays as a forward.
