= Gheorghe Mureșan =

Romanian basketball player (born 1971)

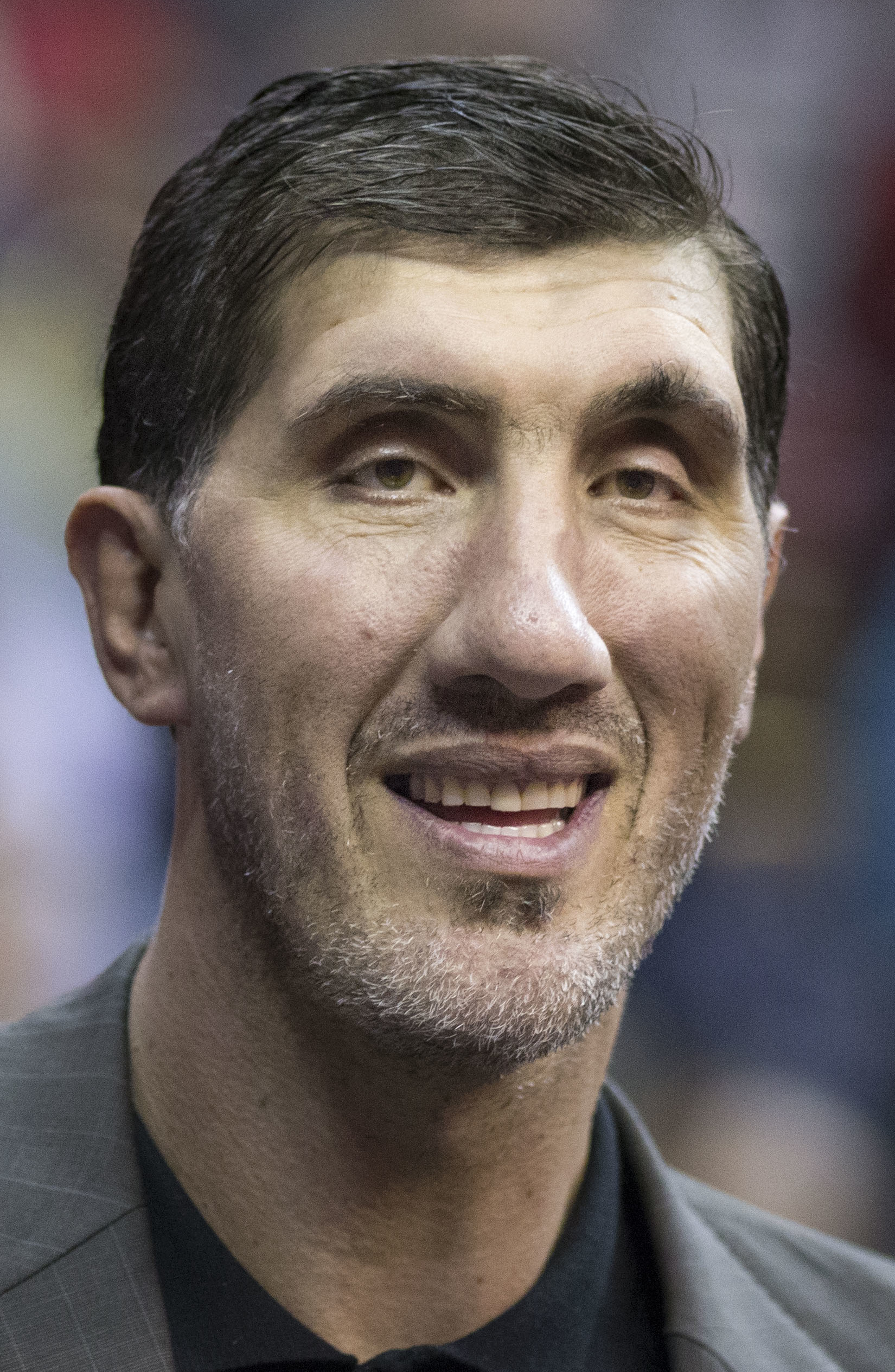
- Mureșan in 2014

Personal information
- Born: 14 February 1971 (age 55) Tritenii de Jos, SR Romania
- Listed height: 7 ft 7 in (2.31 m)
- Listed weight: 303 lb (137 kg)

Career information
- NBA draft: 1993: 2nd round, 30th overall pick
- Drafted by: Washington Bullets
- Playing career: 1991–2001
- Position: Center
- Number: 77

Career history
- 1991–1992: Universitatea Cluj-Napoca
- 1992–1993: Pau-Orthez
- 1993–1998: Washington Bullets / Wizards
- 1999–2000: New Jersey Nets
- 2000–2001: Pau-Orthez

Career highlights
- NBA Most Improved Player (1996); Romanian League champion (1992); French League champion (2001); French League Cup winner (1993)

Career NBA statistics
- Points: 3,020 (9.8 ppg)
- Rebounds: 1,957 (6.4 rpg)
- Blocks: 455 (1.5 bpg)
- Stats at NBA.com
- Stats at Basketball Reference

Gheorghe Dumitru "Ghiță" Mureșan (Romanian pronunciation: [ˈɡe̯orɡe duˈmitru ˈɡitsə mureˈʃan]; born 14 February 1971), also known as "the Giant" (Romanian: Gigantul), is a Romanian former professional basketball player. At 7 feet 7 inches (2.31 m), he is one of the two tallest players to have played in the NBA.

== Early life ==
Mureșan was born in Tritenii de Jos, Cluj County, Romania. Although his parents' heights were relatively typical, he grew to his remarkable height due to a pituitary gland disorder called gigantism.

== Professional career ==
=== CS Universitatea Cluj-Napoca (1991–1992) ===
Mureșan played competitive basketball at Universitatea Cluj, becoming national champion in 1992.

=== Élan Béarnais Pau-Orthez (1992–1993) ===
Mureșan played professionally in the French league with Pau-Orthez during the 1992–93 season and was an instant hit with fans, also managing to win the French League Cup.

=== Washington Bullets / Wizards (1993–1998) ===
Mureșan was selected by the NBA's Washington Bullets in the 1993 NBA draft. He played in the NBA from 1993 to 2000. His career was affected by multiple injuries, despite showing potential early on. His best season came during the 1995–96 campaign, when he averaged 14.5 points per game.

Mureșan was named the NBA's Most Improved Player for the 1995–96 season after averaging 14.5 points, 9.6 rebounds, 2.26 blocks per game while making a league-leading 58.4 percent of his field goals. He led in field goal percentage again the following season, with a 60.4% average. Overall, he holds career averages of 9.8 points, 6.4 rebounds, 0.5 assists, 1.48 blocks per game and a .573 field goal percentage.

=== New Jersey Nets (1999–2000) ===
Mureșan joined the New Jersey Nets for the final 31 games of his NBA career.

=== Return to Pau-Orthez (2000–2001) ===
After ending his NBA career, Mureșan had another stint at Pau-Orthez where he won the French league before returning to the United States with his family. He normally wore number 77, in reference to his height.

On 11 March 2007, Mureșan played a game for the Maryland Nighthawks as part of the tallest lineup in the history of basketball. This was the only basketball game Mureșan played where he was not the tallest person on the court, as Sun Mingming is 7 ft 9 in (2.36 m).

== Other work ==
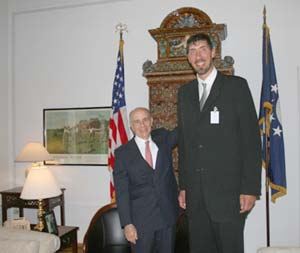
Mureșan meeting with Nicholas F. Taubman, the U.S. Ambassador to Romania

In 2004, Mureșan founded the Giant Basketball Academy (GBA), a program dedicated to teaching the proper fundamentals of basketball to boys and girls of all ages. The Academy is located in Ashburn, Virginia.

Mureșan is also part of the Washington Wizards marketing and public relations team, serving as an "ambassador" for the team.

Mureșan co-authored two young adult fitness and health books: The Boy's Fitness Guide and The Girl's Fitness Guide.

In 2013, Mureșan participated in the first annual 3v3 UMTTR (You Matter) Basketball Tournament to increase awareness, prevention and research of teen suicide, the leading cause of death among adults and children between the ages of 15 and 24.

=== Acting ===
Outside basketball, Mureșan has dabbled in acting, playing the title character in 1998 feature film My Giant starring comedian Billy Crystal. Mureșan also acted in the films Adventures of Serial Buddies (2011) and Manodrome (2023).

He appeared as a ventriloquist in the music video for Eminem's breakthrough single "My Name Is". He has appeared in commercials for Snickers candy bars, and sports television network ESPN.

== Personal life ==
Mureșan and his wife Liliana and sons George (born 1998) and Victor (born 2000) have resided in Franklin Lakes, New Jersey, but they relocated to the suburbs of Washington, D.C. Both his sons played college basketball as walk-ons at Georgetown University, where they were coached by Patrick Ewing.

== Career statistics ==
Legend
GP	Games played	GS	Games started	MPG	Minutes per game
FG%	Field goal percentage	3P%	3-point field goal percentage	FT%	Free throw percentage
RPG	Rebounds per game	APG	Assists per game	SPG	Steals per game
BPG	Blocks per game	PPG	Points per game	**Bold**	Career high
*	Led the league

=== NBA ===
==== Regular season ====
Year	Team	GP	GS	MPG	FG%	3P%	FT%	RPG	APG	SPG	BPG	PPG
1993–94	Washington	54	2	12.0	.545	.000	.676	3.6	.3	.5	.9	5.6
1994–95	Washington	73	58	23.6	.560	.000	**.709**	6.7	.5	.7	1.7	10.0
1995–96	Washington	**76**	**76**	**29.5**	.584*	.000	.619	**9.6**	**.7**	**.7**	**2.3**	**14.5**
1996–97	Washington	73	69	25.3	**.604***	.000	.618	6.6	.4	.6	1.3	10.6
1998–99	New Jersey	1	0	1.0	.000	.000	.000	.0	.0	.0	.0	.0
1999–00	New Jersey	30	2	8.9	.456	.000	.605	2.3	.3	.0	.4	3.5
**Career**		307	207	21.9	.573	.000	.644	6.4	.5	.6	1.5	9.8

==== Playoffs ====
Year	Team	GP	GS	MPG	FG%	3P%	FT%	RPG	APG	SPG	BPG	PPG
1997	Washington	3	3	23.3	.444	–	.875	6.0	.0	.0	1.3	5.0

== See also ==
- List of tallest players in NBA history
- List of tallest people
