= Sfântu Gheorghe =

Sfântu Gheorghe Sepsiszentgyörgy (Hungarian)
- Municipality
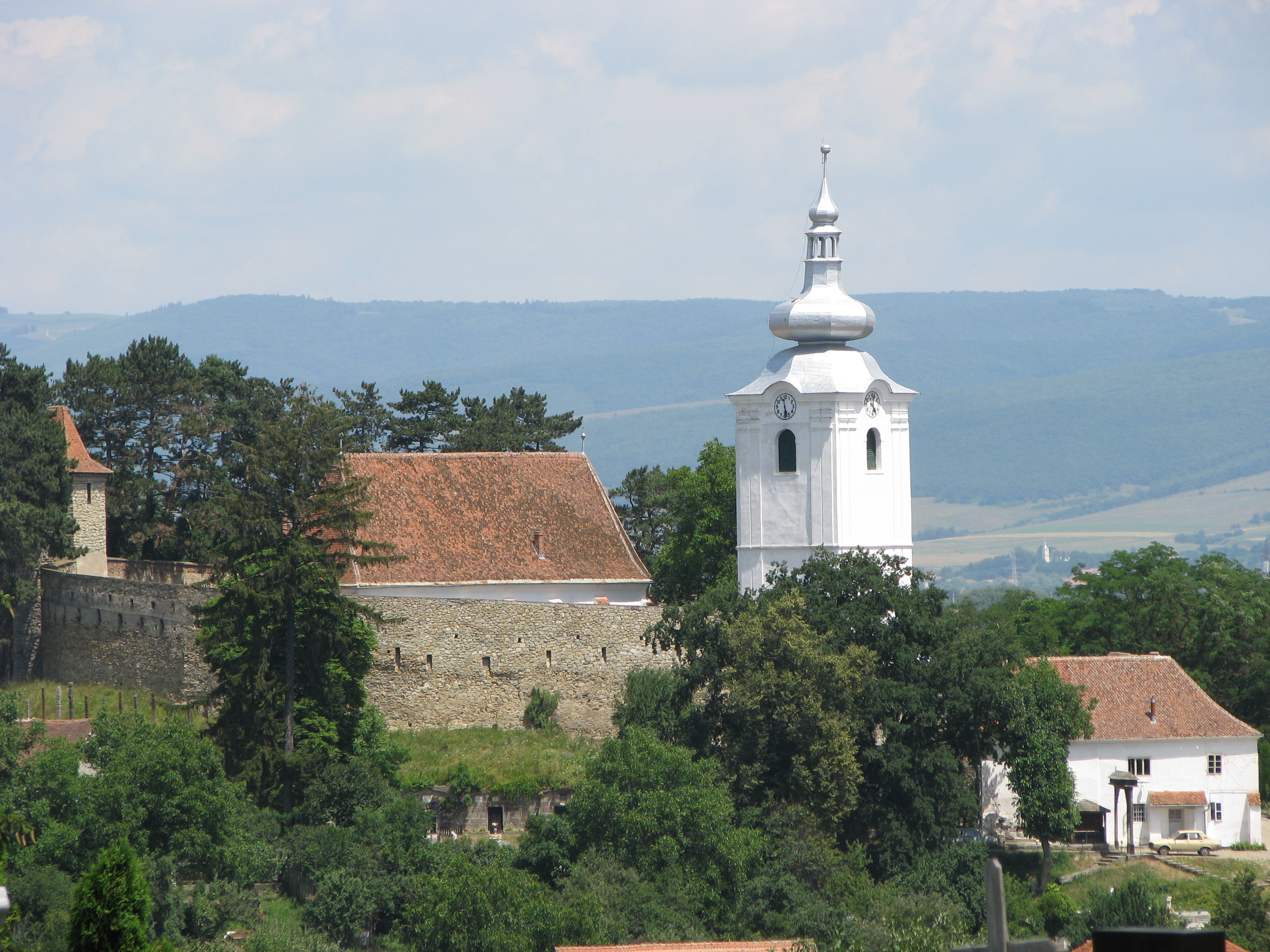
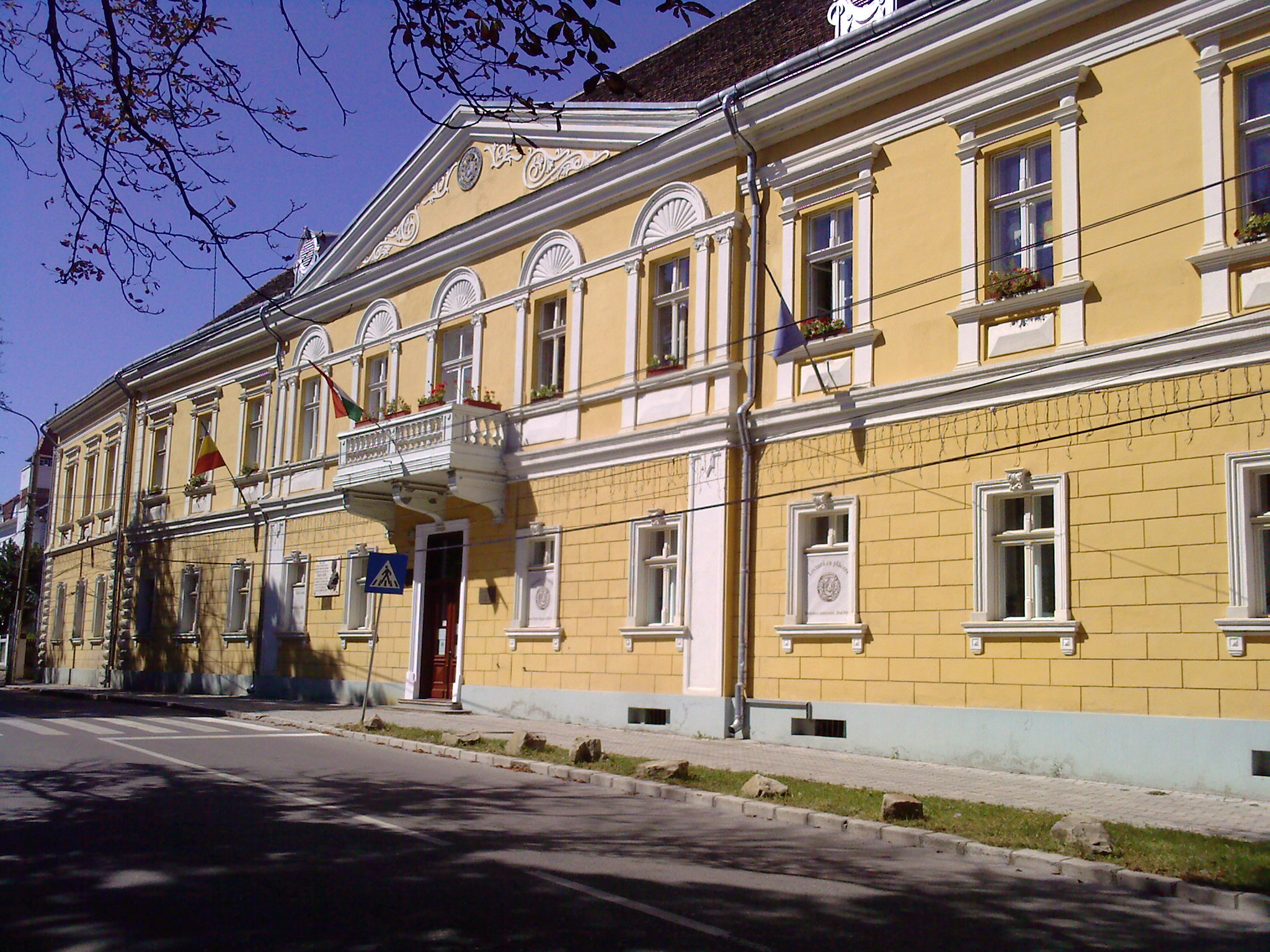
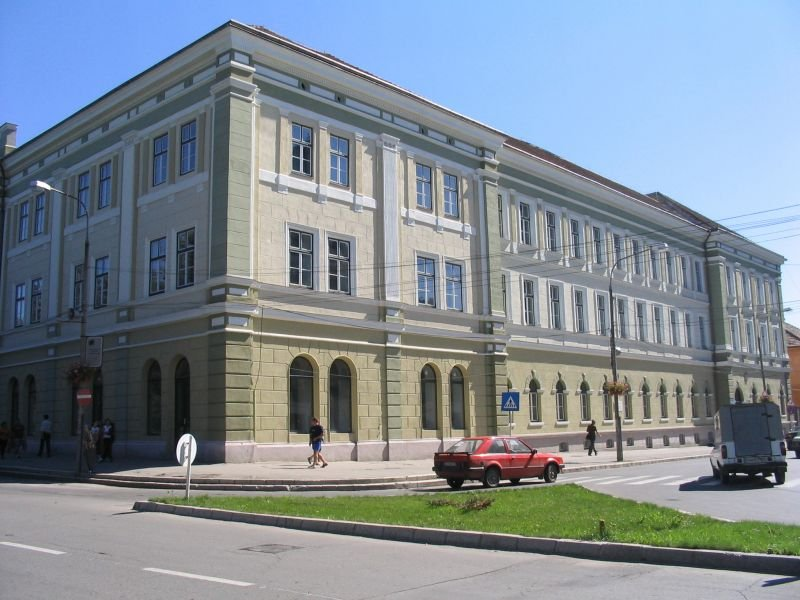
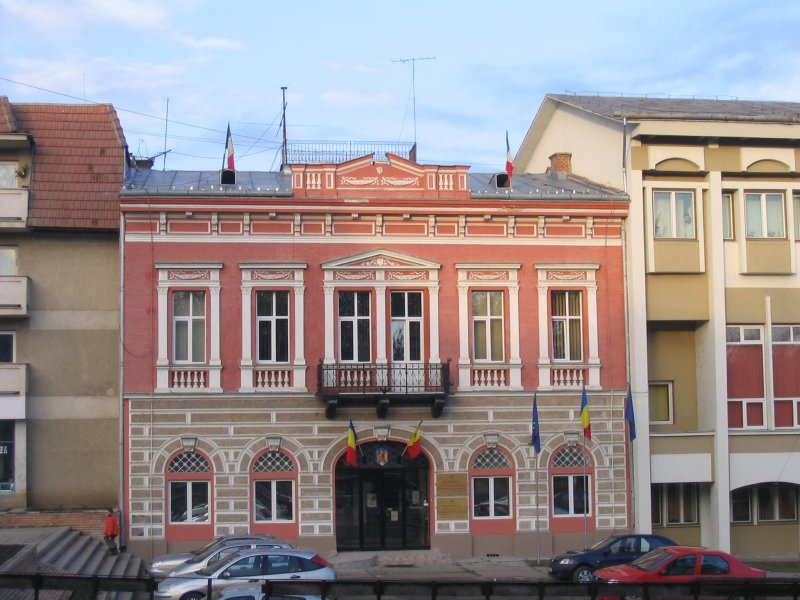
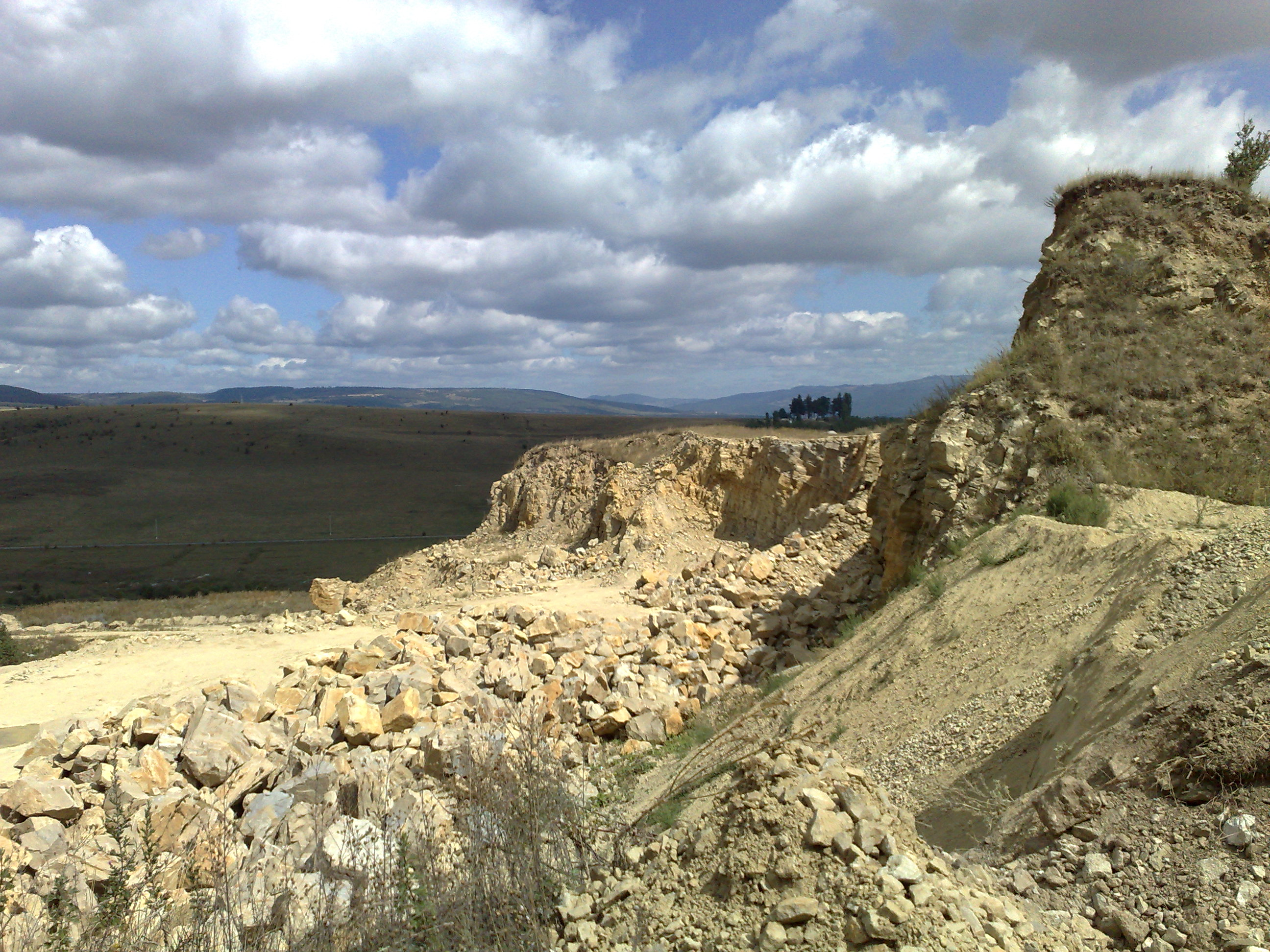
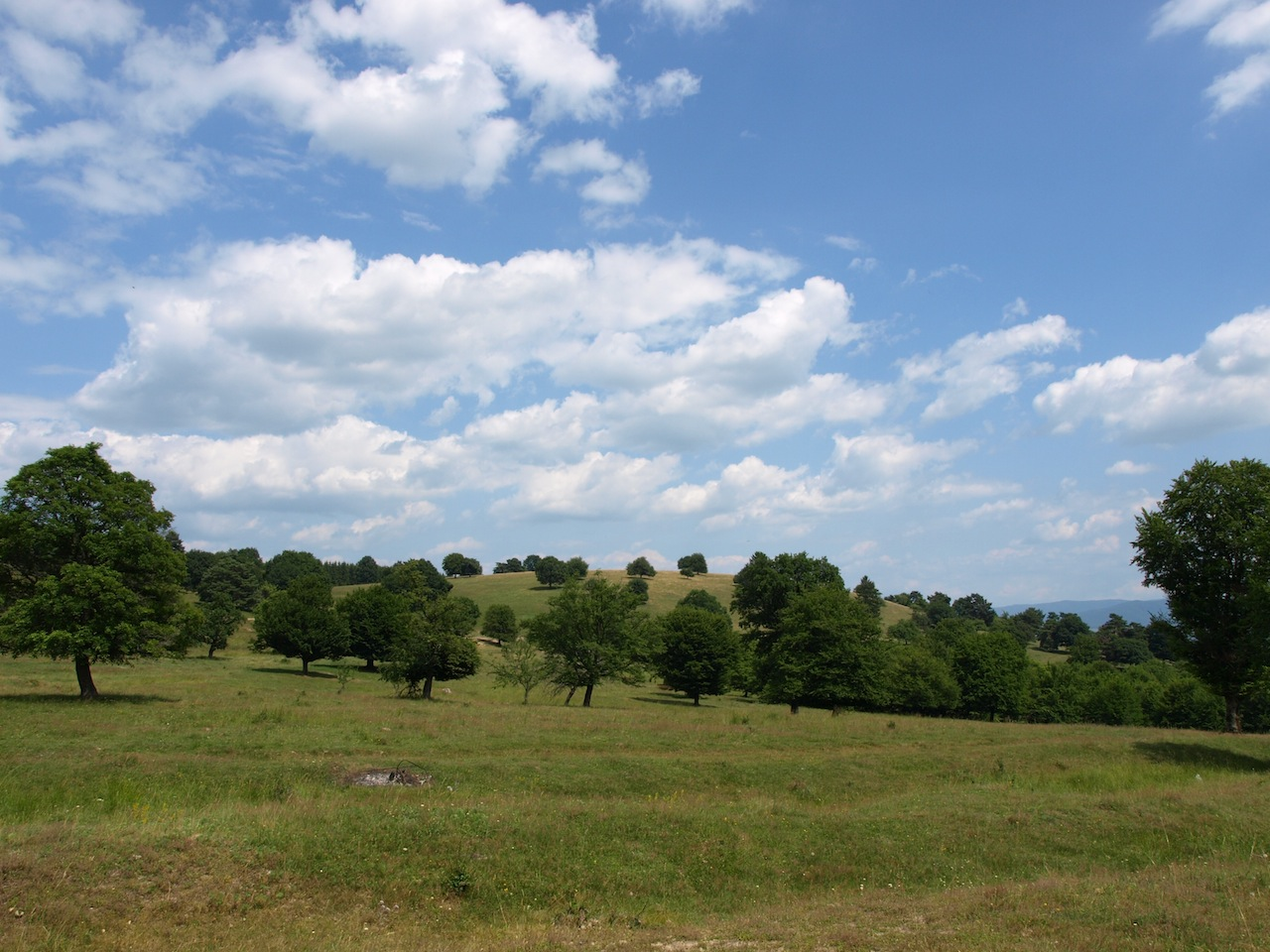
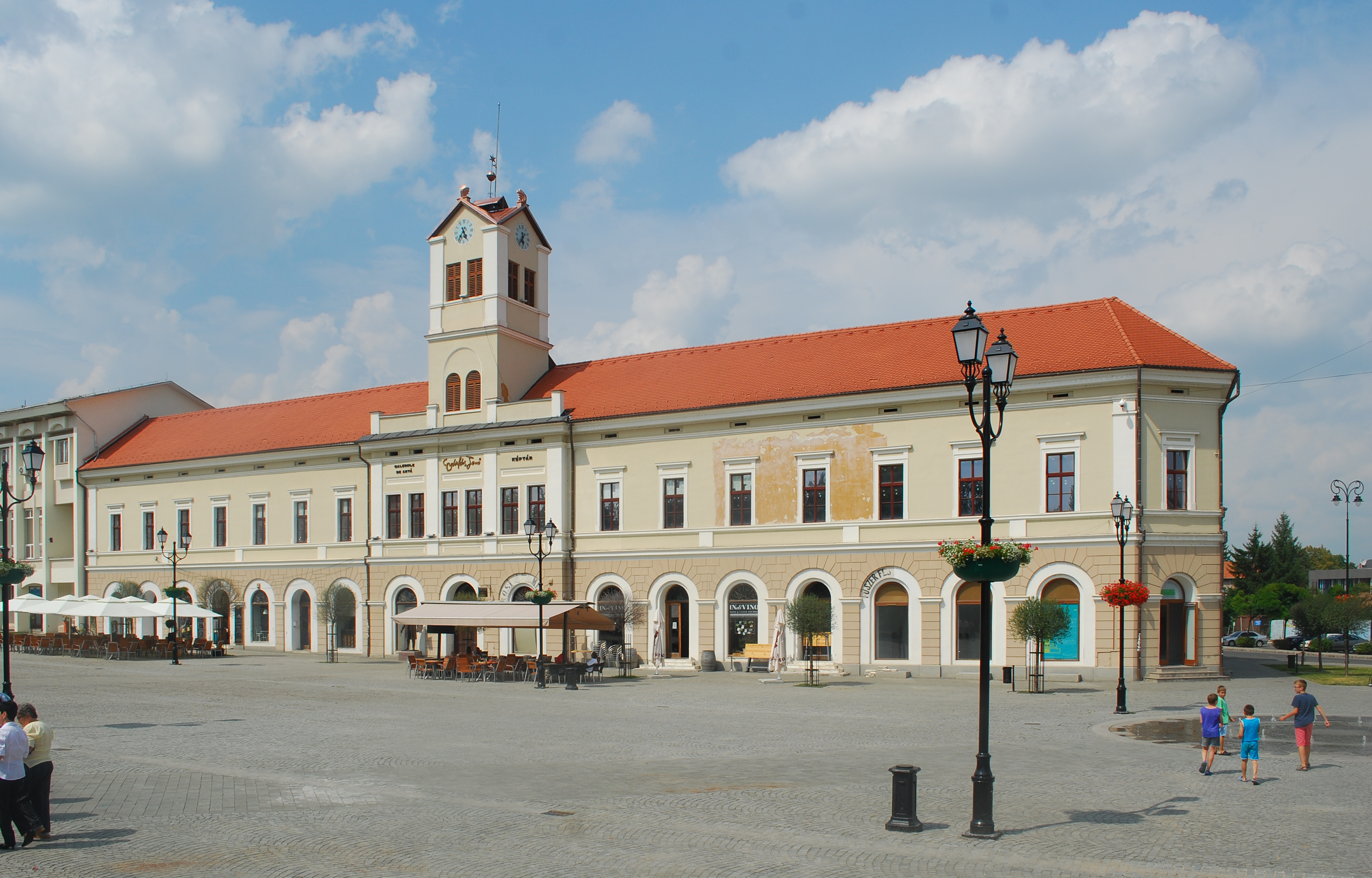
- Descending, from top: Fortified reformed church, County library, Mikó Székely college, Fogolyánhouse, stone mine near Őrkő, nature near Benedekmező, art gallery

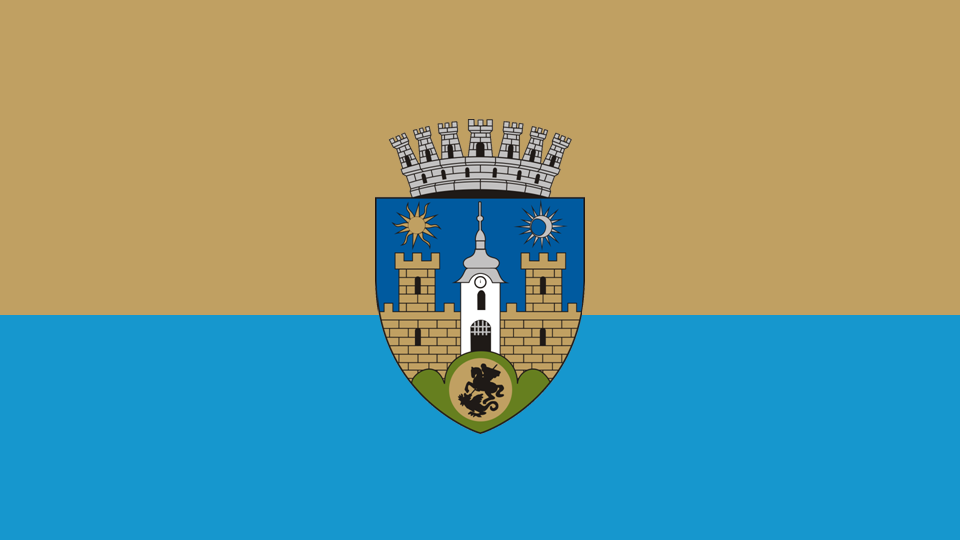
- Flag Coat of arms

- Location in Covasna County

- Location in Romania
- Coordinates: 45°51′49″N 25°47′15″E
- Country: Romania
- County: Covasna

Government
  - Mayor (2024–2028): Árpád András Antal (UDMR)
- Area: 72.92 km^{2} (28.15 sq mi)
- Elevation: 555 m (1,821 ft)
- Population (2021-12-01): 50,080
  - Density: 686.8/km^{2} (1,779/sq mi)
- Time zone: UTC+02:00 (EET)
  - Summer (DST): UTC+03:00 (EEST)
- Postal code: 520003–520093
- Area code: (+40) 02 67
- Vehicle reg.: CV
- Website: www.sfantugheorgheinfo.ro

Sfântu Gheorghe (pronounced [ˈsfɨntu ˈɡe̯orɡe]; Hungarian: Sepsiszentgyörgy [ˈʃɛpʃisɛɲɟørɟ], or Szentgyörgy; Yiddish: סנט דזשארדזש; German: Sankt Georgen; English lit.: Saint George) is a city that serves as the seat of Covasna County in Transylvania, Romania. Located in the central part of the country, it lies on the Olt River in a valley between the Baraolt Mountains and the Bodoc Mountains. The town administers two villages, Chilieni (Hungarian: Kilyén) and Coșeni (Hungarian: Szotyor).

== History ==
Sfântu Gheorghe is one of the oldest urban settlements in Transylvania, the town first having been documented in 1332. The town takes its name from Saint George, the patron of the local church. Historically, it was also known in German as Sankt Georgen. The "sepsi" prefix (sebesi → sepsi, meaning "of Sebes") refers to the area which the ancestors of the local Székely population had inhabited before settling to the area of the town. The previous area of their settlement was around the town of "Sebes" (now Sebeș, in Alba County) which later became populated mainly by Transylvanian Saxons (German: Siebenbürger Sachsen), being known as Mühlbach in German.

While part of the Kingdom of Hungary, the town was the economic and administrative center of the Hungarian county of Háromszék, which spanned the present-day Covasna County and parts of Brașov County. In the second half of the 19th century, Sepsiszentgyörgy witnessed the development of light industry, a textile and a cigarette factory being built. In the aftermath of World War I, the Union of Transylvania with Romania was declared in December 1918. At the start of the Hungarian–Romanian War of 1918–1919, the town passed under Romanian administration. After the Treaty of Trianon of 1920, it became part of the Kingdom of Romania and the seat of Trei Scaune County. In 1940, the Second Vienna Award granted Northern Transylvania to the Kingdom of Hungary. Near the end of that period, the Sfântu Gheorghe ghetto briefly existed in the town. In September 1944, during World War II, Romanian and Soviet armies entered the town. The territory of Northern Transylvania remained under Soviet military administration until 9 March 1945, after which it became again part of Romania; the Paris Peace Treaties of 1947 reaffirmed the town and the entirety of Transylvania as a Romanian territory. Between 1952 and 1960, Sfântu Gheorghe was the southernmost town of the Magyar Autonomous Region, and between 1960 and 1968 it was part of the Brașov Region. In 1968, when Romania was reorganized based on counties rather than regions, the city became the seat of Covasna County.

Sfântu Gheorghe is one of the centres for the Székely people in the region, known to them as Székelyföld in Hungarian – which means "Székely Land", and is home to the Székely National Museum. The town hosts two market fairs each year.

== Demographics ==
Historical population
Year	Pop.	±%
1912	8,665	—
1930	10,818	+24.8%
1948	14,224	+31.5%
1956	17,638	+24.0%
1966	20,768	+17.7%
1977	40,804	+96.5%
1992	68,359	+67.5%
2002	61,512	−10.0%
2011	56,006	−9.0%
2021	50,080	−10.6%
Source: Census data

At the 2021 census, the city had a population of 50,080; of those, 69.25% were Hungarians and 18.93% Romanians. At the 2011 census, 41,233 (74%) of the city's 56,006 inhabitants declared themselves as ethnic Hungarians, 11,807 (21%) as Romanians, 398 (0.7%) as Roma, and 2,562 as other ethnicities or no information; 74% had Hungarian as first language, and 21% Romanian.

== Sights ==
- Fortified Church, constructed in the 14th century in Gothic style
- Beör Palace, constructed in the 19th century in Neoclassical style
- State Archive, the former headquarters of the Hussar battalions
- Covasna County Library, constructed in 1832 as the seat of the county council
- Theater used from 1854 to 1866 as the city hall
- The market bazaar, built in 1868, with a clock tower built in 1893
- Székely National Museum, founded 1875

== Economy ==
The predominant industry in the city is the textile industry. The city holds underutilized production capabilities such as a downsized automobile transmission parts and gearboxes factory (IMASA SA) and a tobacco factory (ȚIGARETE SA).

Services sector contains growing areas such as IT services with ROMARG SRL the leading domain registrar and web hosting provider in Romania having its headquarters here.

== Sports ==
=== Football ===
The main sport in the city is football. The city has a men's football team, called Sepsi OSK Sfântu Gheorghe (Sepsiszentgyörgyi OSK). In the 2016–2017 season the team was promoted from Liga II and currently plays in Liga I. There were two notable football clubs from the city Sepsiszentgyörgyi SE and Sepsiszentgyörgyi Textil SE playing in the Nemzeti Bajnokság II and Nemzeti Bajnokság III.

=== Basketball ===
Sfântu Gheorghe has also a women's basketball team, called ACS Sepsi SIC. The club competes in Liga Națională (the Romanian First League). Sepsi SIC has won the Romanian Championship 7 times: in the 2016, 2017, 2018, 2019, 2021, 2022, and 2023 seasons.

=== Futsal ===
The city also has a futsal team which plays in the Romanian First Division. The name of the team is Futsal Club Sfântu Gheorghe (Sepsiszentgyörgyi Futsal Club).

== Culture ==
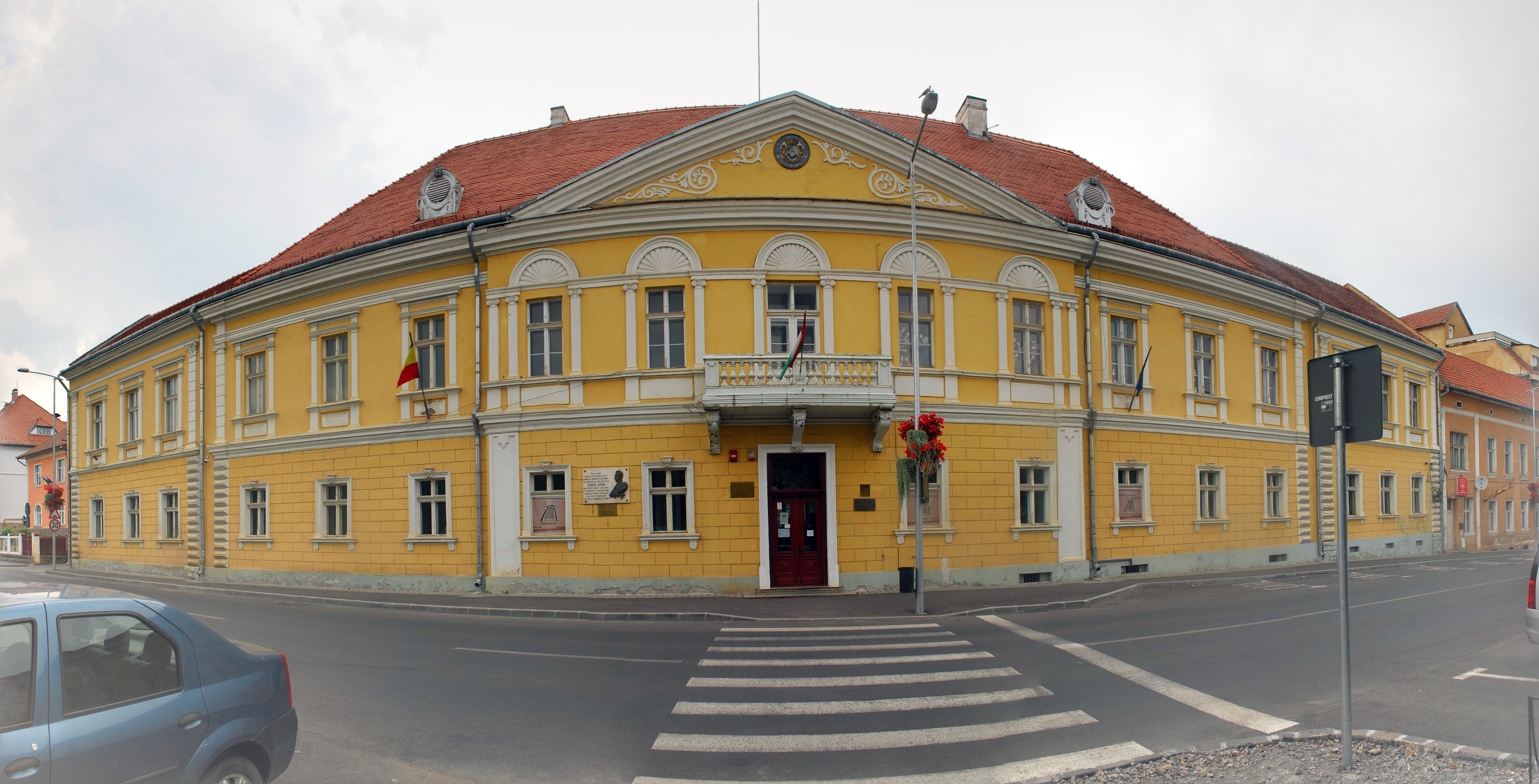
The Covasna County Library

The city has two theaters (the Andrei Mureșanu Theater and the Tamási Áron Theater), a county library (the Covasna County Library), and two museums (the National Museum of the Eastern Carpathians and the Székely National Museum).

The Hungarian artist Jenő Gyárfás was born there and was a lifelong resident. His former studio is now an art gallery and exhibition hall.

The Orthodox Cathedral of “St. George the Great Martyr and St. Nicholas” was built from 1939 to 1983. In 1993 the Museum of Romanian Spirituality was established at the Cathedral. On 28 September 2024, a bust of Archpriest Aurel Nistor (1882-1974) was unveiled, by Moldovan sculptor Veaceslav Jiglițchi.

== Education ==
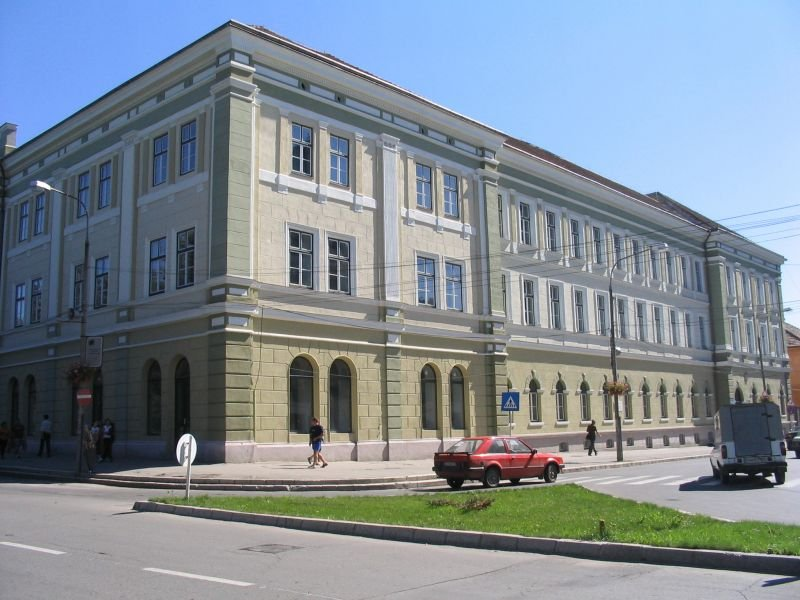
The main building of the Mikó High School

- Puskás Tivadar High School
- Székely Mikó High School
- Mikes Kelemen High School
- Mihai Viteazul National College
- Plugor Sandor Art High School
- Váradi József School

== Natives ==
- Tibor Benkő (1905–1988), fencer and modern pentathlete
- István Berde (born 1988), footballer
- Gavrilă Birău (born 1945), footballer and football manager
- Annamari Dancs, singer
- Endre Elekes (born 1968), wrestler
- Jenő Gyárfás (1857–1925), portrait painter, graphic artist, and writer
- Attila Hadnagy (born 1980), footballer
- Kriszta Incze (born 1996), freestyle wrestler
- Laura Codruța Kövesi (born 1973), prosecutor
- Nandor Kuti (born 1997), basketball player
- Edit Matei (born 1964), handballer
- Szilárd Mitra (born 1987), footballer
- Csongor Olteán (born 1984), javelin thrower
- Gabriela Rotiș (born 1980), handballer
- Valentin Suciu (born 1980), football manager
- Marius Szőke (born 1993), handballer
- Dan Tanasă (born 1981), politician
- Maria Török-Duca (born 1959), handballer and handball manager
- Lajos Veress (1889–1976), Hungarian military officer
- Zsombor Veress (born 1999), footballer
