= Teodor Murășanu =

Romanian writer (1891–1966)

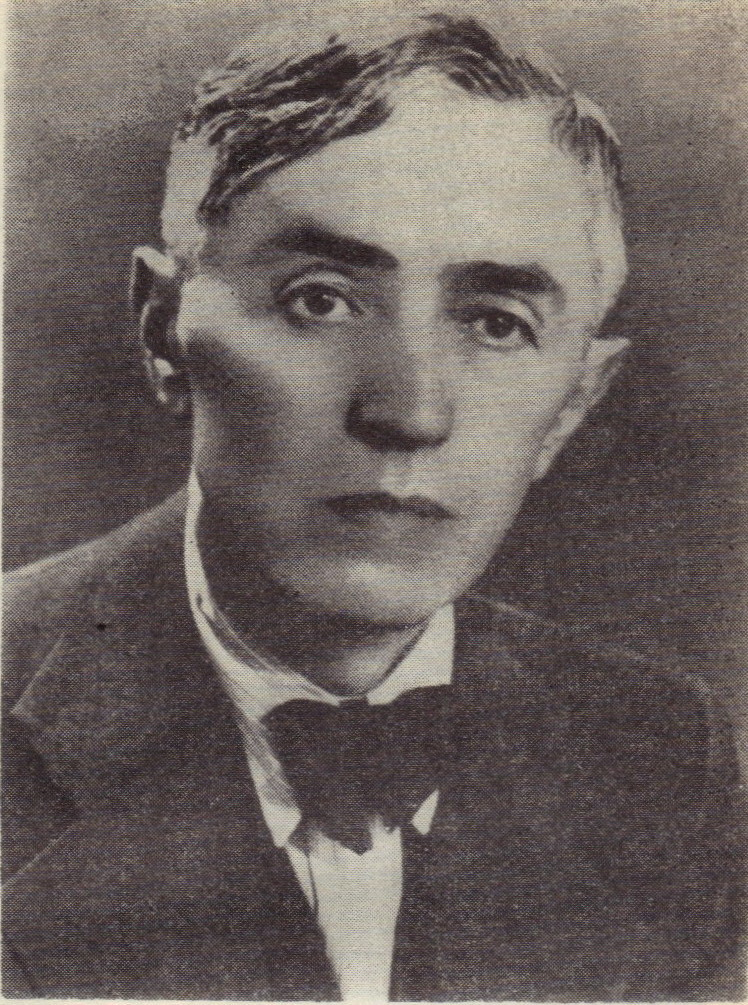
- Born: 19 July 1891; Câmpia Turzii, Austria-Hungary
- Died: 2 September 1966 (aged 75)
- Citizenship: Romania
- Education: Franz Joseph University; Eötvös Loránd University
- Occupations: journalist biographer

Teodor Murăşanu (Romanian pronunciation: [teˈodor murəˈʃanu]; 19 July 1891 in Câmpia Turzii – 2 September 1966) was a writer and teacher in Turda, Romania in the first half of the 20th century.

== Biography ==
Teodor Murășanu was born in a peasant family. He was the second of the five children of Vasile Murășanu and Eudochia (Dochița), born Danciu, both peasants from Urca.

He attended high school in Blaj (1904–1912), then studied at Eötvös Loránd University (1912–1916) and Franz Joseph University (1918–1919). In 1919, he was appointed teacher of Romanian at King Ferdinand High School in Turda. In 1916 he was ordained priest on behalf of Panticeu parish. Between 1918 and 1919 he studied Philology and Philosophy at the University of Cluj, after which he was appointed professor of Romanian language and literature at the "King Ferdinand High School" in Turda (today Mihai Viteazul National College), where he founded reading society "Titu Maiorescu" and founded the school magazine "Fire Cake".

He made his debut in 1906 with the poem "Pastel", printed in the weekly magazine "Unirea" from Blaj. He collaborated in various publications, especially with poems, both before and after the Great Union of 1918. After 1918 he wrote in Turda, with some intermittencies, the weekly "Turda" (or "Arieșul"), and between 1933 and 1943 the prestigious “Pagini literare” magazine, with the collaboration of Pavel Dan, Mihail Beniuc, Grigore Popa and others. He published several volumes of poems: “Poems” (Turda, 1920), “Winds blown by the wind” (Arad, 1923), “Sacrifice smoke” (Cluj, 1923; volume awarded in 1934 by the Romanian Academy, at the proposal Octavian Goga), “Chiot câmpenesc” (Cluj, 1926), “Lilioara” (Sighișoara, 1938 and Cluj, 1982). He also published volumes of prose. He contributed to the establishment of the “Arieșul” printing house in Turda.

In his memory, in front of the former "King Ferdinand High School" in Turda (today Mihai Viteazul National College) a statue was installed (the work of sculptor Aurel Terec, unveiled on 25 October 1995), and the Turda Municipal Library and a school in Turda are named "Teodor Murășanu" ("Teodor Murășanu" School, 53 Dr. Ion Rațiu Street).
