= Mihai Viteazul National College (Sfântu Gheorghe) =

Romanian high school

Coordinates: 45.8608°N 25.7841°E

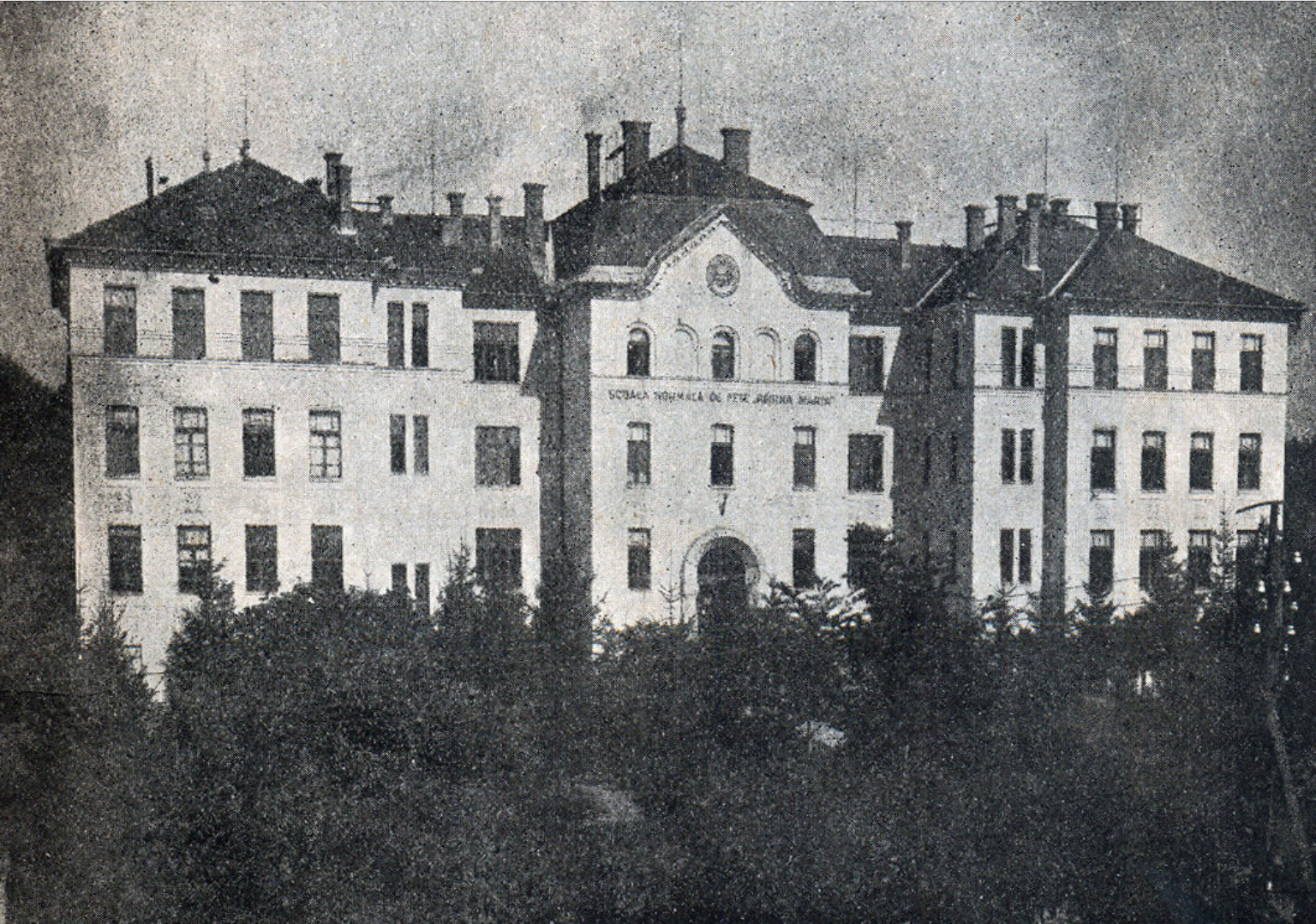
The school in 1923

Mihai Viteazul National College (Romanian: Colegiul Național Mihai Viteazul) is a high school located at 22 Kós Károly Street, Sfântu Gheorghe, Romania.

The old wing of the school was built in 1908–1910, on the site of a demolished beer factory; the area was then part of Austria-Hungary. New buildings were added over the years, such as a dormitory and a gymnasium. Courses opened in September 1920, nearly two years after the union of Transylvania with Romania. The institution was originally a normal school for training teachers, and was dedicated to Queen Marie.

In the 1922–1923 school year, there were 279 girls in attendance, of whom 204 were promoted. Students came from various parts of Greater Romania and had different social backgrounds; some were the daughters of bureaucrats or farmers, while others were World War I orphans. By 1926–1927, there were 310, of whom 304 were ethnic Romanian. Students would venture into the countryside, holding literary and cultural events for the Székely villagers, hoping to “revive” the Romanian language, traditional dress and games. Officials of the period assumed that many Székely were really “hidden” Romanians whose buried national consciousness could be brought to the surface.

With the onset of the communist regime, the queen's name was dropped. The school underwent several changes in focus, from philology and history to industry. Eventually dedicated to Michael the Brave, it was declared a national college in 2001. It is the only regular high school in Sfântu Gheorghe where teaching is done in Romanian; the others are Hungarian-language schools.

The school building is listed as a historic monument by Romania's Ministry of Culture and Religious Affairs.
