= Pavel Dan =

Romanian writer (1907–1937)

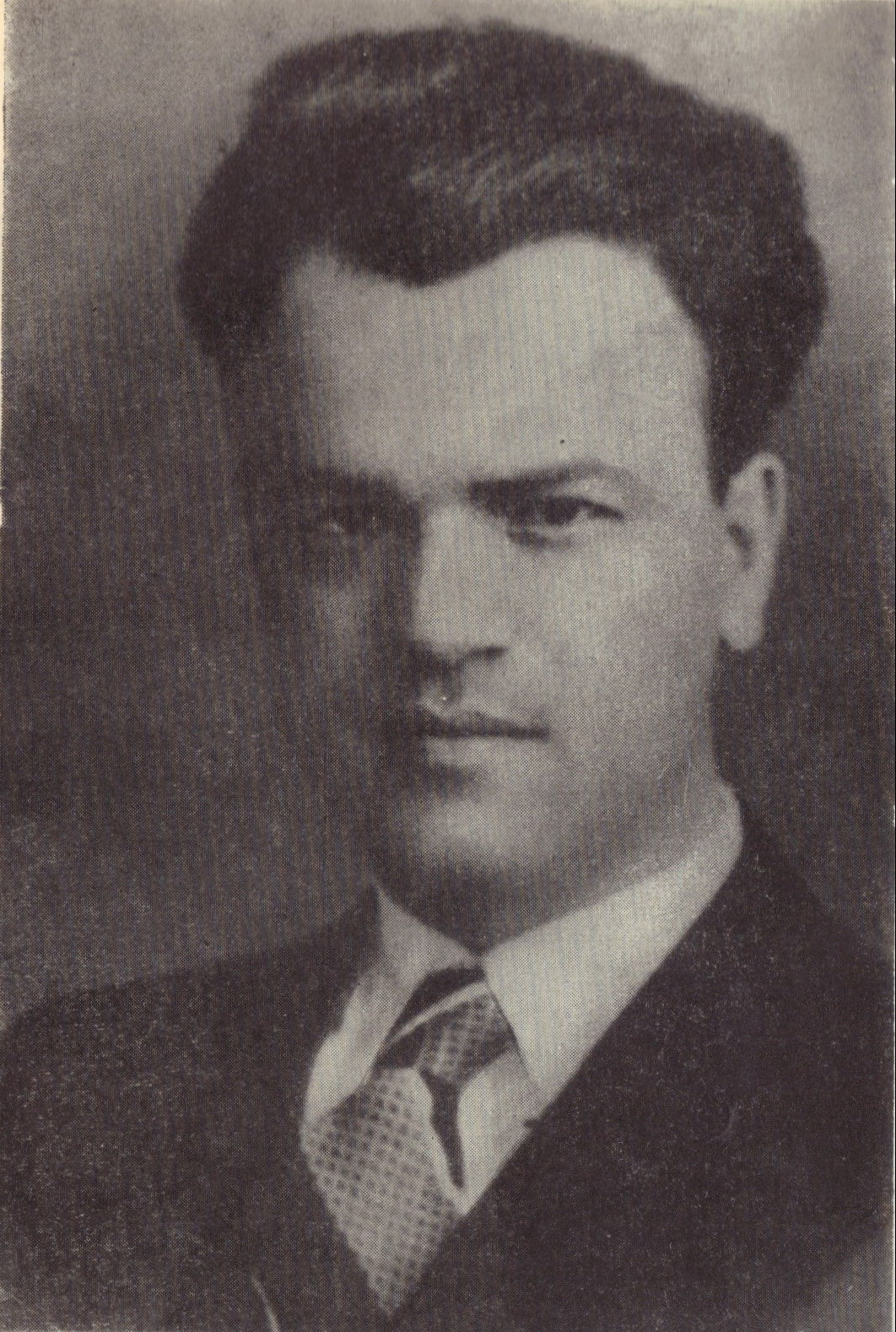
Pavel Dan in 1935

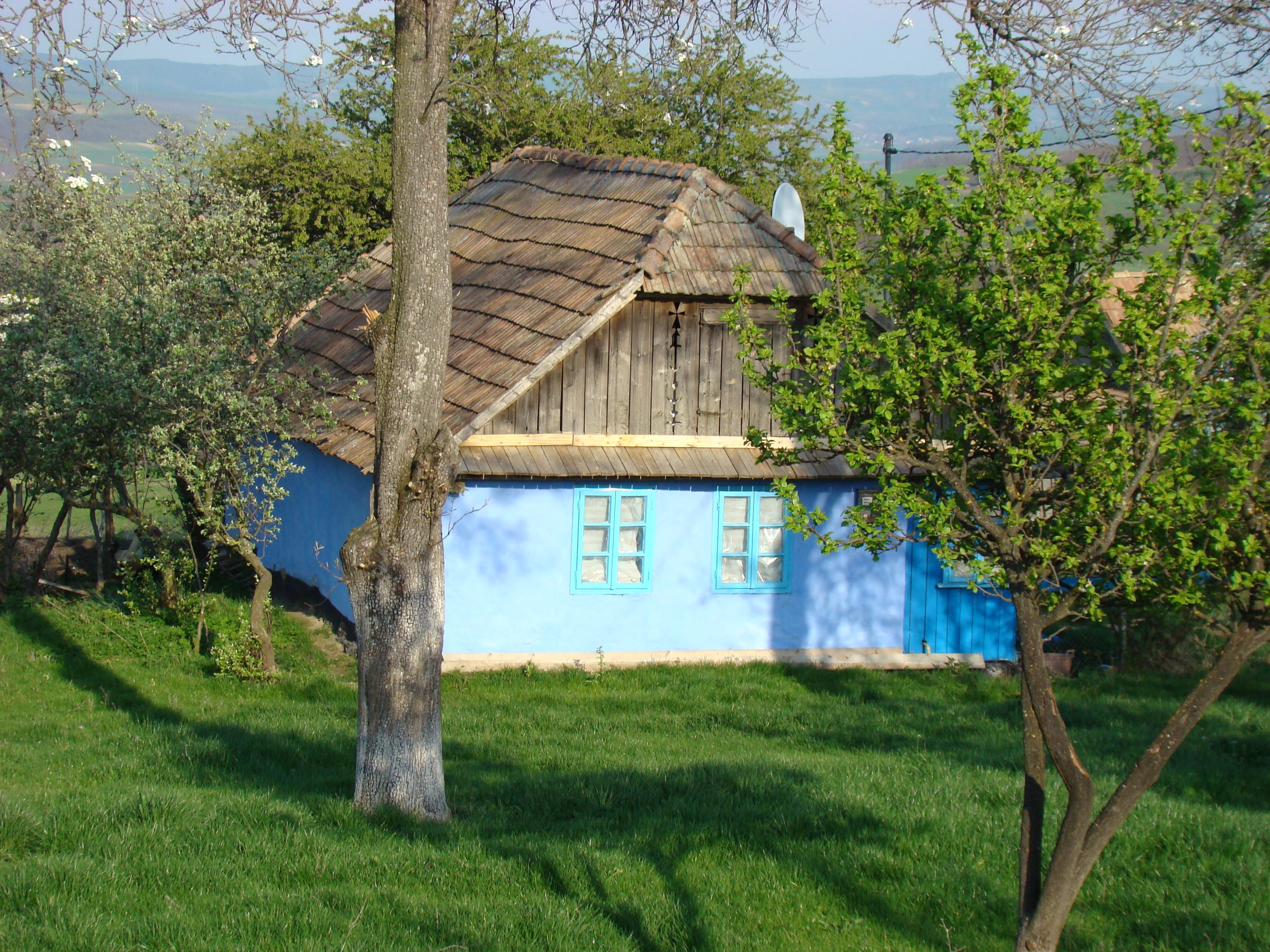
Dan's native home in Clapa village, Tritenii de Jos

Pavel Dan (September 3, 1907 – August 2, 1937) was an Austro-Hungarian-born Romanian prose writer.

He was born in Clapa, Cluj County, in the Transylvania region. His parents, Simion Dan and Maria (née Tescariu), were poor peasants. He began primary school in 1914, and would later caricature his classmate Samoilă Gabor in "Intelectualii". He took part in a peasant uprising in nearby Țigăreni village, later transposing the event into another era in "Iobagii". In 1919, following the union of Transylvania with Romania, he entered the Romanian high school in Turda; "Întâlnire" and "Vedenii din copilărie" dealt with the atmosphere of the provincial town. During this period, the only positive figure in Dan's life was his teacher Teodor Murășanu, himself a writer and editor at Pagini literare, where Dan also contributed. As a schoolboy, he was preoccupied by large-scale literary projects that remained unfinished (the novels Mizerie and Logodnica, and the novella O răzbunare sângeroasă). He was a participant in the activities of the Titu Maiorescu reading society, and the magazine Fire de tort appeared upon his initiative in 1925. In 1927, he entered the literature faculty of the University of Cluj; his main specialty was Romanian language, with a secondary field being Latin. He was involved in Victor Papilian's circle.

Dan's published debut as a critic took place in 1930, with a review of Garabet Ibrăileanu's Note și impresii in Darul vremii. The second number of the same magazine included his short story "Ursita". In 1931, he became librarian and pedagogue at the high school in Turda. The following year, he was hired to teach at Sfântul Vasile High School in Blaj. From 1934 to 1936, he published a number of stories in Blajul magazine, including "Îl duc pe popa", "Corigențe", "Întâlnire" and "La închisoare". A single prose work of his, "Priveghiul", ran in Gândirea. In 1936, he won the literary contest of România nouă with the story "Iobagii". The short story collection Urcan bătrânul, introduced by Ion Chinezu, was published posthumously in 1938. Soon after the event, Octav Șuluțiu wrote that his death "has cut short the appearance of one of the greatest Romanian writers, in the full course of his evolution". A more circumspect George Călinescu merely lamented the early passing of "a probably powerful writer".

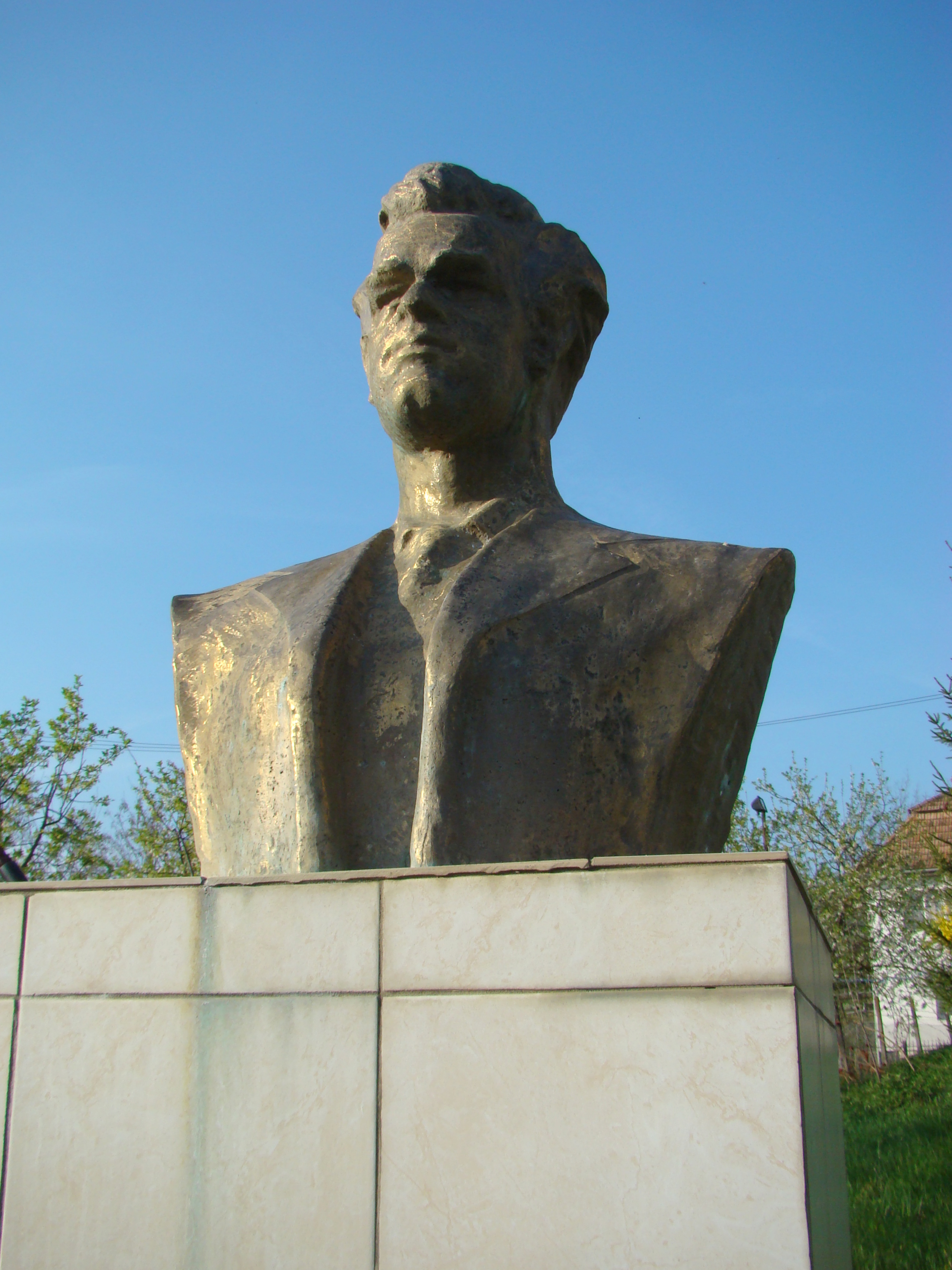
Bust of Pavel Dan in Tritenii de Jos

A high school in Câmpia Turzii and an elementary school in Tritenii de Jos now bear his name.
