= Bertalan Karlovszky =

Hungarian painter

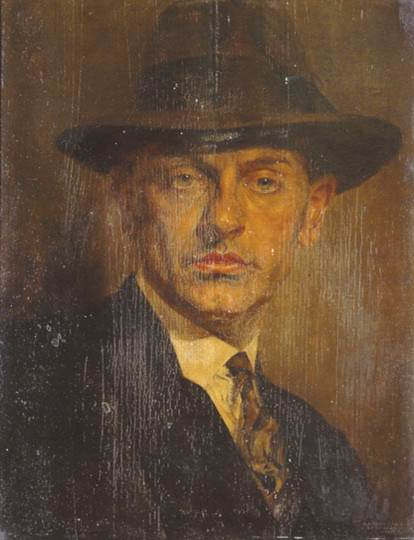
Self-portrait (1924)

Bertalan Karlovszky (24 October 1858, Munkács – 11 April 1938, Budapest) was a Hungarian painter.

== Biography ==
His parents moved to Budapest when he very young and he attended the public schools there. Showing no interest in a higher education, he was enrolled at a Military Academy. However, he spent most of his time in class making drawings of his instructors and fellow students, rather than listening to the lectures. Soon, he was the talk of the school and painted a portrait of his commanding officer from a photograph. The officer was so impressed that he spoke to Bertalan's mother and suggested that he be given artistic training.

After three years as a cadet, he was sent to the Academy of Fine Arts, Munich, where he studied under Otto Seitz. He was later invited to Paris by Mihály Munkácsy and spent a year in Munkácsy's studio, improving to the point where his works could hardly be distinguished from his teacher's. He began exhibiting his genre paintings at the Salon, where they proved to be quite popular. They became a common sight in shop windows and he sought out connections with American art dealers. They proved to be as popular there and fetched high prices.

After his return from abroad in 1894, he settled in Budapest, producing illustrations and doing portraits. For many years, he operated a painting school. In 1921, he had a major retrospective at the Hall of Art and, in 1928, he became a Professor at the Hungarian University of Fine Arts.

== Selected paintings ==
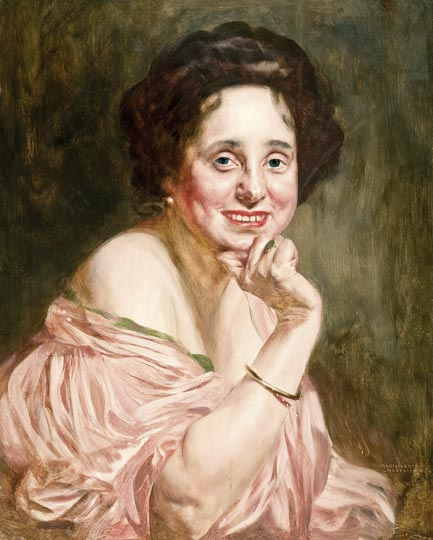
Portrait of a
Laughing Lady

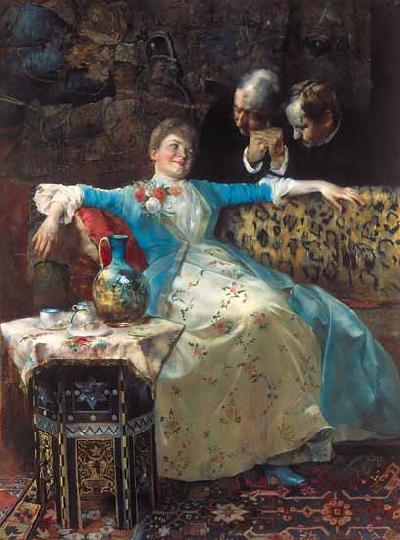
Wooers

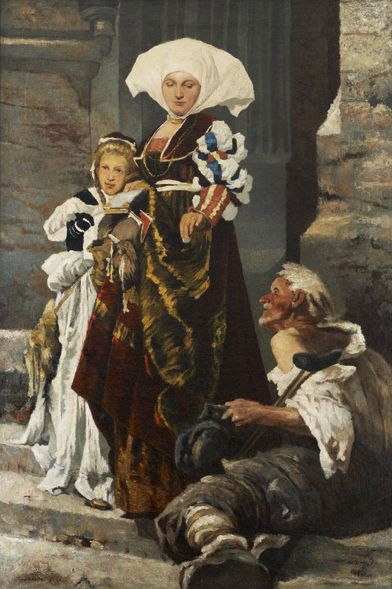
Alms

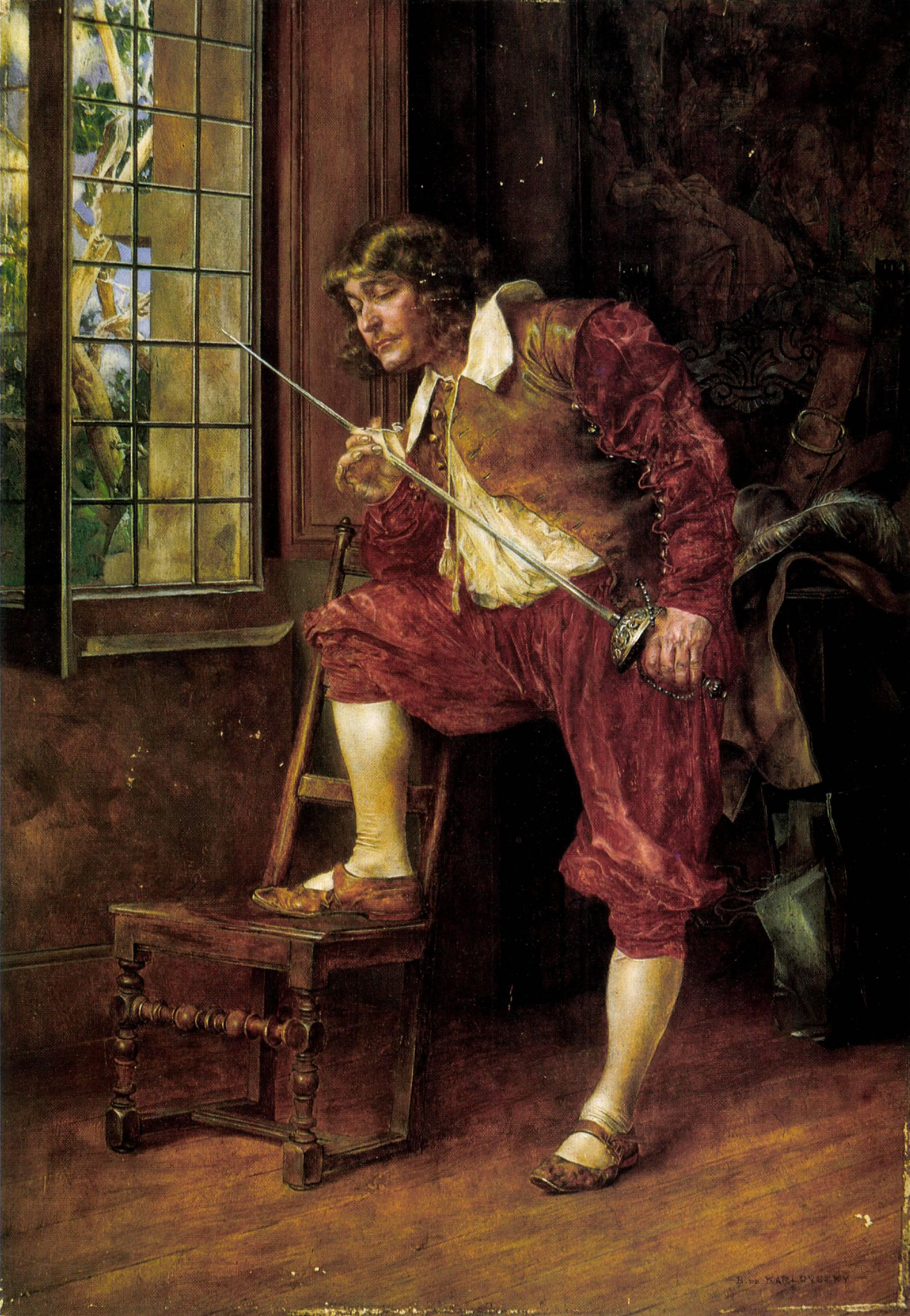
Figure from the Period of Louis XIII

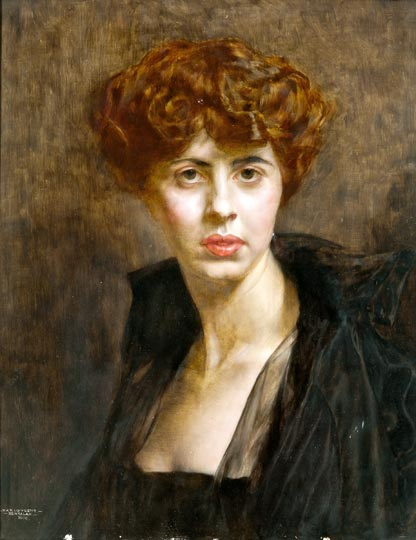
Portrait of a Lady
