= Tritenii de Jos =

- Commune
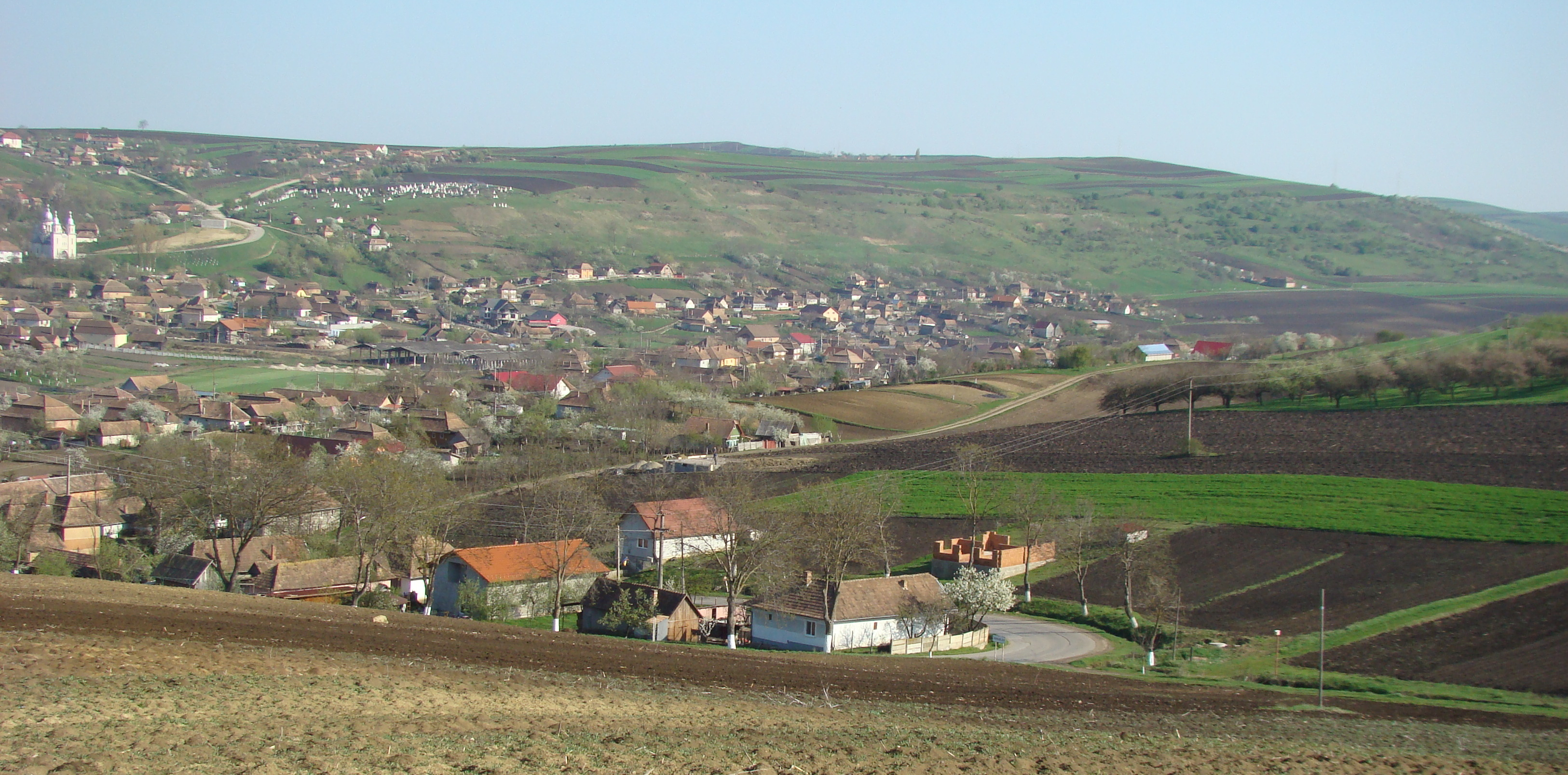
- Tritenii de Jos

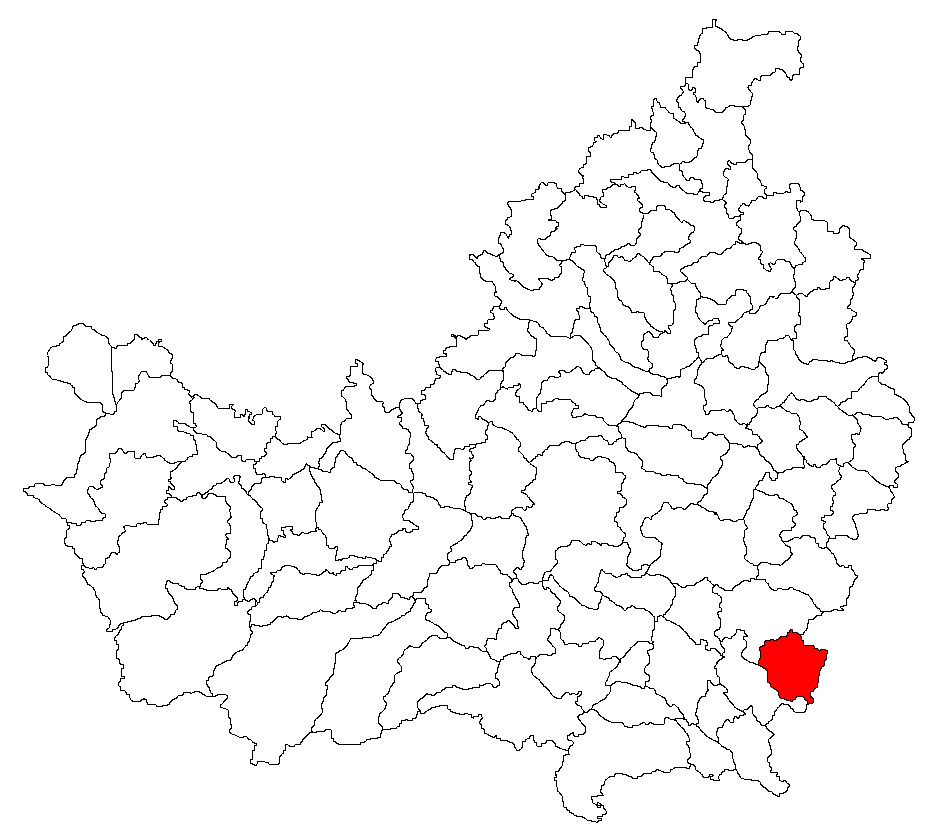
- Location in Cluj County

- Location in Romania
- Coordinates: 46°35′9.96″N 23°59′47.4″E
- Country: Romania
- County: Cluj
- Subdivisions: Clapa, Colonia, Pădureni, Tritenii de Jos, Tritenii de Sus, Tritenii-Hotar

Government
  - Mayor (2020–2024): Alexandru-Iosif Dan (Green Party)
- Area: 59.48 km^{2} (22.97 sq mi)
- Elevation: 364 m (1,194 ft)
- Highest elevation: 525 m (1,722 ft)
- Lowest elevation: 300 m (980 ft)
- Population (2021-12-01): 3,950
  - Density: 66.4/km^{2} (172/sq mi)
- Time zone: UTC+02:00 (EET)
  - Summer (DST): UTC+03:00 (EEST)
- Postal code: 407550
- Area code: (+40) 02 64
- Vehicle reg.: CJ
- Website: primariatriteniidejos.ro

Tritenii de Jos (Hungarian: Alsódetrehem) is a commune in Cluj County, Transylvania, Romania. It is composed of six villages: Clapa (Szentkirályi tanya), Colonia (Detrehemtelep), Pădurenii (Țigăreni until 1964, also formerly called Coc; Mezőkók), Tritenii de Jos, Tritenii de Sus (Felsődetrehem), and Tritenii-Hotar (Irisorai tanyák).

== Geography ==
The commune is situated on the Transylvanian Plateau, at an altitude of 364 m (1,194 ft), on the banks of the river Valea Largă. It is located in the southeastern part of Cluj County, 22 km (14 mi) east of Turda and 52 km (32 mi) southeast of the county seat, Cluj-Napoca, on the border with Mureș County.

== Demographics ==
Historical population
Year	Pop.	±%
1850	2,152	—
1880	2,522	+17.2%
1890	2,519	−0.1%
1900	3,071	+21.9%
1910	3,382	+10.1%
1920	3,624	+7.2%
1930	4,262	+17.6%
1941	4,810	+12.9%
1966	5,954	+23.8%
1977	6,379	+7.1%
1992	5,358	−16.0%
2002	5,066	−5.4%
2011	4,240	−16.3%
2021	3,950	−6.8%
Source: Census data

According to the census from 2002 there was a total population of 5,066 people living in this commune. Of this population, 90.99% were ethnic Romanians, 8.23% were ethnic Hungarians and 0.75% ethnic Romani. At the 2011 census, the population had decreased to 4,240, of which 88.84% were Romanians and 8% Hungarians. At the 2021 census, Tritenii de Jos had a population of 3,950, of which 87.92% were Romanians and 6.33% Hungarians.

== Natives ==
- Pavel Dan (1907 – 1937), prose writer
- Emil Hațieganu (1878 — 1959), politician and jurist
- Gheorghe Mureșan (born 1971), former NBA basketball player
