= Mihai Viteazul National College (Turda) =

College in Turda, Romania

Coordinates: 46.5751°N 23.7783°E

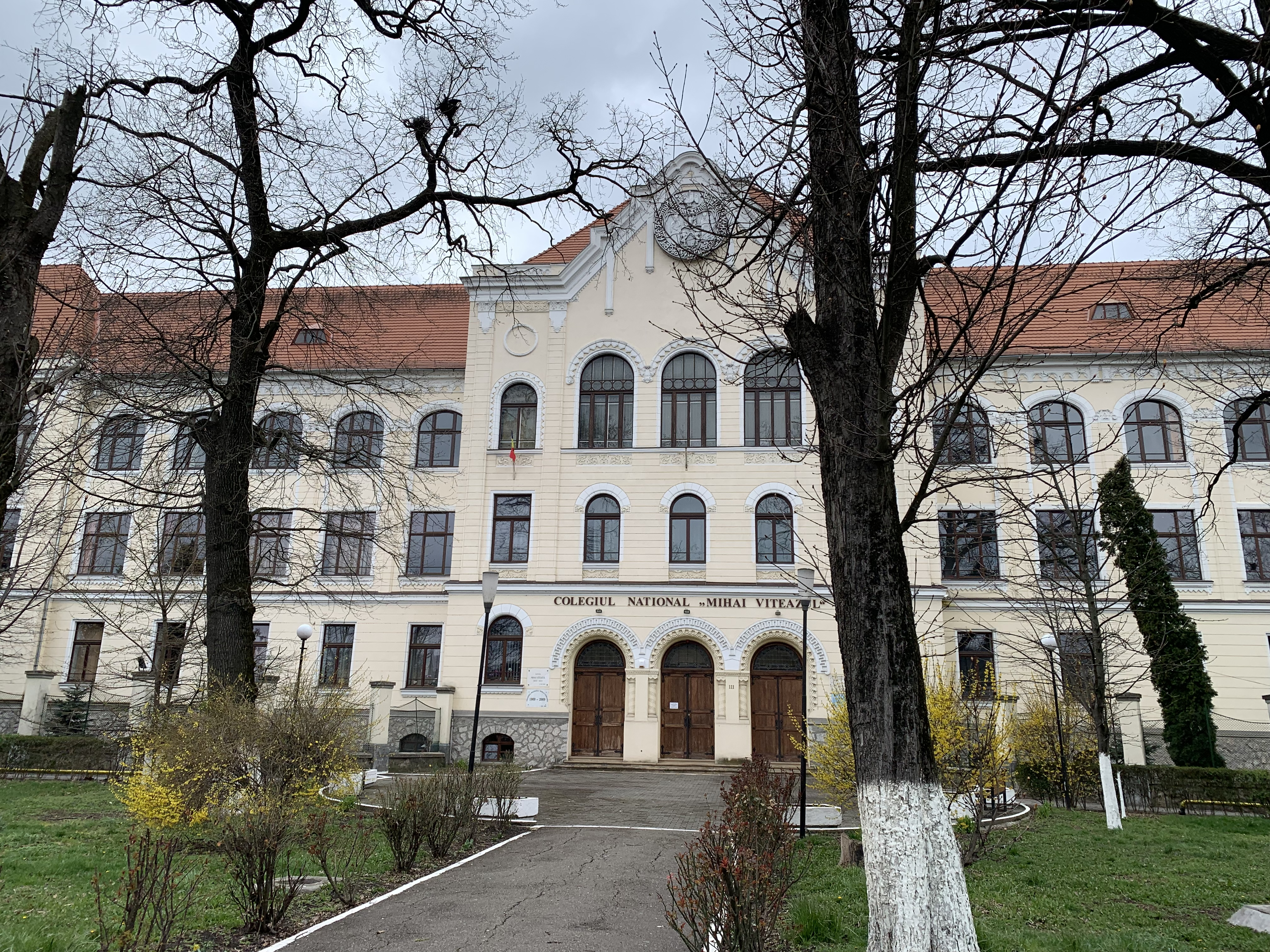
Mihai Viteazul National College, Turda, Cluj in 2023

Mihai Viteazul National College (Romanian: Colegiul Național Mihai Viteazul) is a high school located at 111 Dr. Ioan Rațiu Street, Turda, Romania.

The cornerstone of the school building was laid in 1908, when Turda was part of Austria-Hungary. It was completed in 1909; then, over the next two years, workers installed electricity, running water and heating. Classes in the nine-grade school were inaugurated in time for the 1911–1912 year. Pupils were both Hungarian and Romanian. Shortly after the 1918 union of Transylvania with Romania, when the school had 314 pupils, it was taken over by the Romanian state.

In the first year, the school was unofficially called after Michael the Brave. In 1920, after he had visited the latter's nearby grave, it was formally named for King Ferdinand I. During the interwar period, the school became a local center of Romanian culture. This role expanded during World War II, when the Second Vienna Award granted Northern Transylvania to Hungary. As the border was placed just north of Turda, the school filled with refugees, with enrollment reaching 67 in a single class.

In 1948, the new communist regime dropped King Ferdinand's name. The dedication to Michael the Brave came in 1957, the same year girls were first admitted. In 1959, the town's Hungarian high school was merged into Mihai Viteazul; henceforth, classes in Hungarian were offered in addition to Romanian. Twelfth grade was restored in 1967. Made an industrial high school in 1977, lasting until after the Romanian Revolution, the school focused on research and production. It was declared a national college in 1999.

== Alumni ==
- Pavel Dan
- Oliviu Gherman
- Horia Moculescu
- Ovidiu Iuliu Moldovan
- Camil Mureșanu
