= Viișoara, Cluj =

Viișoara
- Commune
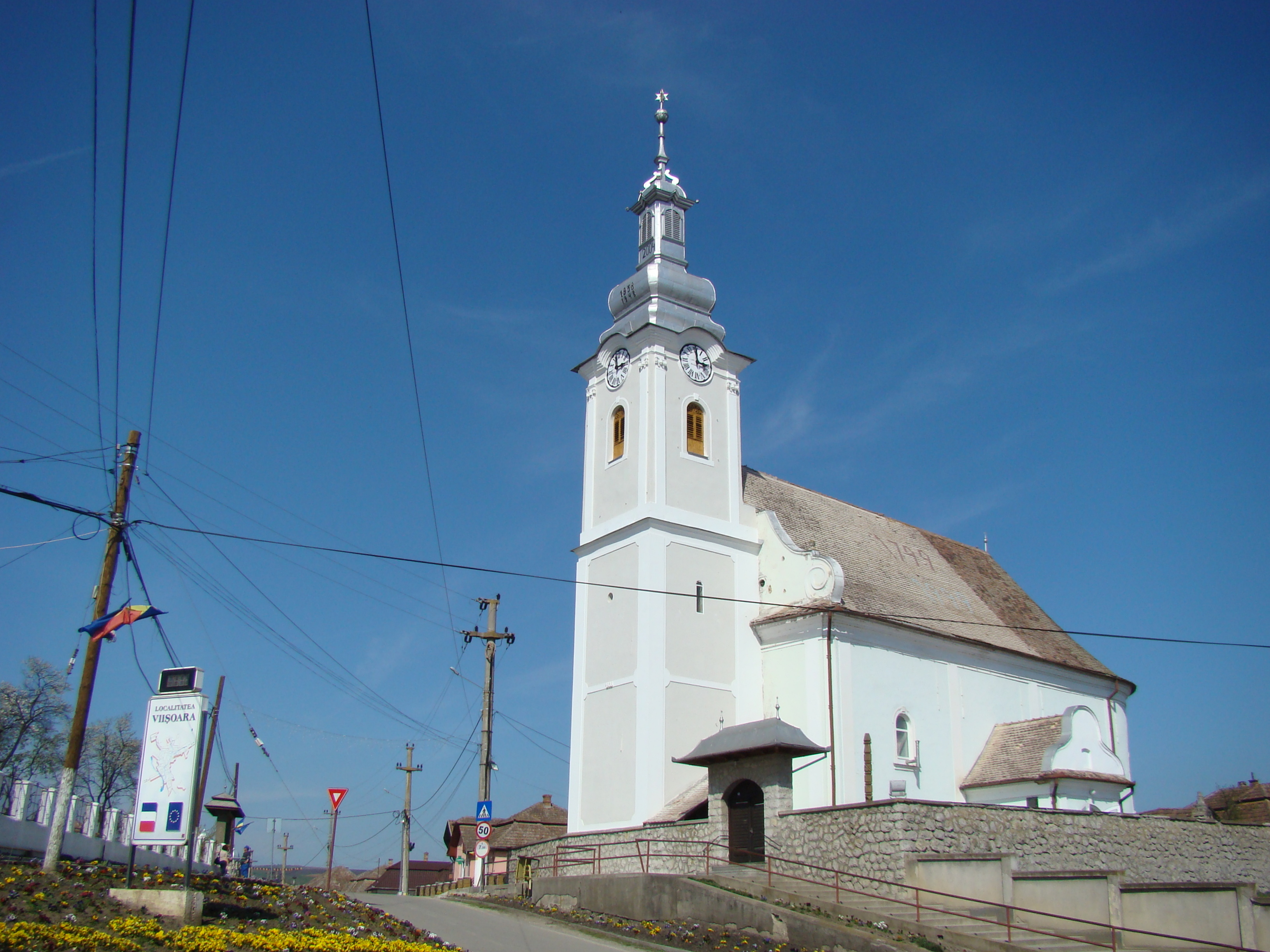
- Reformed church in Viișoara

- Location in Cluj County

- Location in Romania
- Coordinates: 46°33′28.44″N 23°54′35.28″E
- Country: Romania
- County: Cluj
- Subdivisions: Urca, Viișoara

Government
  - Mayor (2020–2024): Ioan Roman (PSD)
- Area: 61.53 km^{2} (23.76 sq mi)
- Elevation: 303 m (994 ft)
- Population (2021-12-01): 5,668
  - Density: 92.12/km^{2} (238.6/sq mi)
- Time zone: UTC+02:00 (EET)
  - Summer (DST): UTC+03:00 (EEST)
- Postal code: 407590
- Area code: (+40) 02 64
- Vehicle reg.: CJ
- Website: comunaviisoara.ro

Viișoara (Hungarian: Aranyosegerbegy; German: Erlenmarkt) is a commune in Cluj County, Transylvania, Romania. It is composed of two villages, Urca (Mezőőrke) and Viișoara.

The commune lies in the Transylvanian Plain, on the banks of the river Arieș. It is located in the southeastern part of the county, on the border with Mureș County.

== Demographics ==
Historical population
Year	Pop.	±%
1850	2,951	—
1880	3,130	+6.1%
1890	3,471	+10.9%
1900	3,564	+2.7%
1910	3,833	+7.5%
1920	3,839	+0.2%
1930	4,673	+21.7%
1941	5,226	+11.8%
1956	5,551	+6.2%
1966	6,924	+24.7%
1977	7,098	+2.5%
1992	6,003	−15.4%
2002	5,852	−2.5%
2011	5,493	−6.1%
2021	5,668	+3.2%
Source: Census data

According to the census from 2002 there was a total population of 5,852 people living in this commune; of this population, 65.92% were ethnic Romanians, 24.21% ethnic Hungarians, and 9.80% ethnic Romani. At the 2021 census, Viișoara had a population of 5,668, of which 61.84% were Romanians, 16.43% Hungarians, and 15.07% Romani.

== Natives ==
- Mircea Dragoș Biji (1913–1992), statistician, corresponding member of the Romanian Academy
- Andor Fejér (born 1960), Hungarian electrical engineer and politician
