= Ceanu Mare =

- Commune
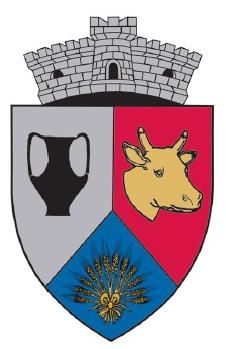
- Coat of arms

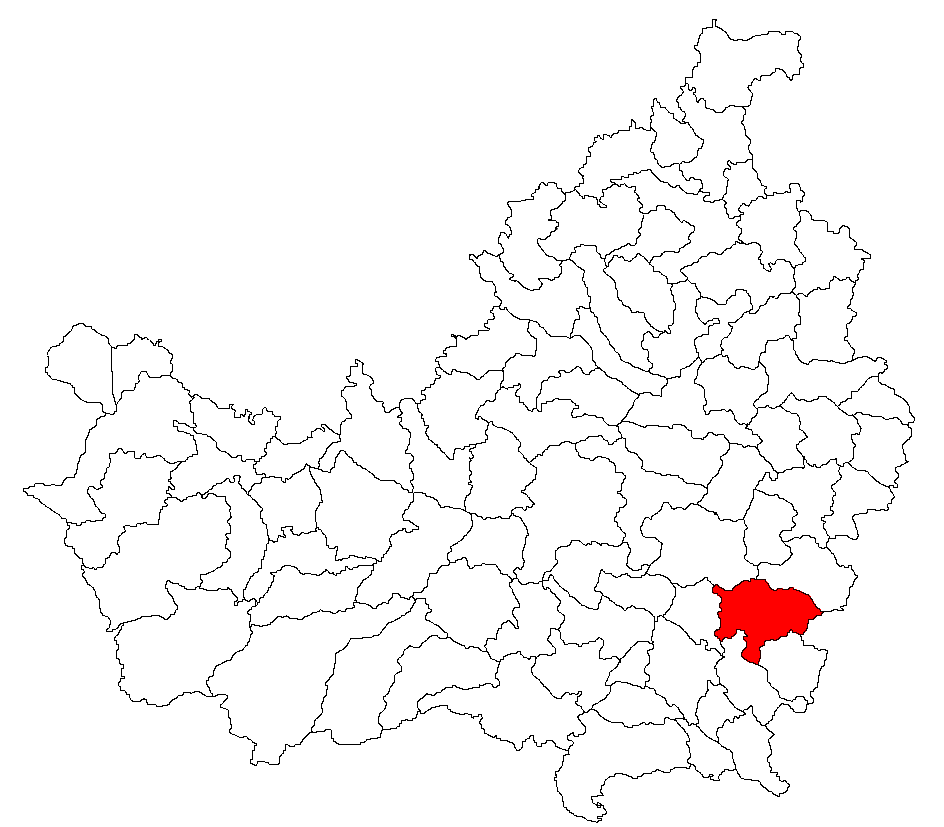
- Location in Cluj County

- Location in Romania
- Coordinates: 46°39′N 23°58′E
- Country: Romania
- County: Cluj
- Established: 1293
- Subdivisions: Andici, Boian, Bolduț, Ceanu Mare, Ciurgău, Dosu Napului, Fânațe, Hodăi-Boian, Iacobeni, Morțești, Stârcu, Strucut, Valea lui Cati

Government
  - Mayor (2020–2024): Virgil Păcurar (PMP)
- Area: 37.54 km^{2} (14.49 sq mi)
- Elevation: 368 m (1,207 ft)
- Population (2021-12-01): 3,333
  - Density: 89/km^{2} (230/sq mi)
- Time zone: EET/EEST (UTC+2/+3)
- Postal code: 407185
- Area code: +(40) x264
- Vehicle reg.: CJ
- Website: ceanu-mare.ro

Ceanu Mare (Hungarian: Mezőcsán; German: Gross-Tschaan) is a commune in the north-west of Romania, in Cluj County, Transylvania. It is composed of thirteen villages: Andici (depopulated since 1985; Andics), Boian (Mezőbő), Bolduț (Boldoc), Ceanu Mare, Ciurgău (Csurgó), Dosu Napului (Oláhtóhát), Fânațe (Csániszénafű), Hodăi-Boian (Mezőbőifogadó), Iacobeni (Mezőszentjakab), Morțești (Morcest), Stârcu (Csóka), Strucut (merged with Gherea in 1968; Sztinkutdűlő), and Valea lui Cati (Sárospatakdűlő).

The village is known in Germany after the Schröder family discovered that the father of former Chancellor Gerhard Schröder was buried there in a common grave in 1944. Lieutenant Fritz Schröder was a soldier in the German army during World War II and he died at the age of 32 near the city of Turda (Thorenburg in German) on 4 October 1944, without ever seeing his newborn son Gerhard.

== Demographics ==
According to the census from 2002 there were 4,322 people living in this commune; of this population, 94.08% were ethnic Romanians, 3.51% ethnic Roma, and 2.36% ethnic Hungarians. At the 2021 census, Ceanu Mare had a population of 3,333; of those, 84.7% were Romanians and 1.41% Roma.
