= Agârbiceanu =

Agârbiceanu is a surname. Notable people with the surname include:

- Ion Agârbiceanu (1882–1963), Austro-Hungarian-born Romanian writer
- Ion I. Agârbiceanu (1907–1971), Romanian physicist
