= Bucium, Alba =

Bucium
- Commune
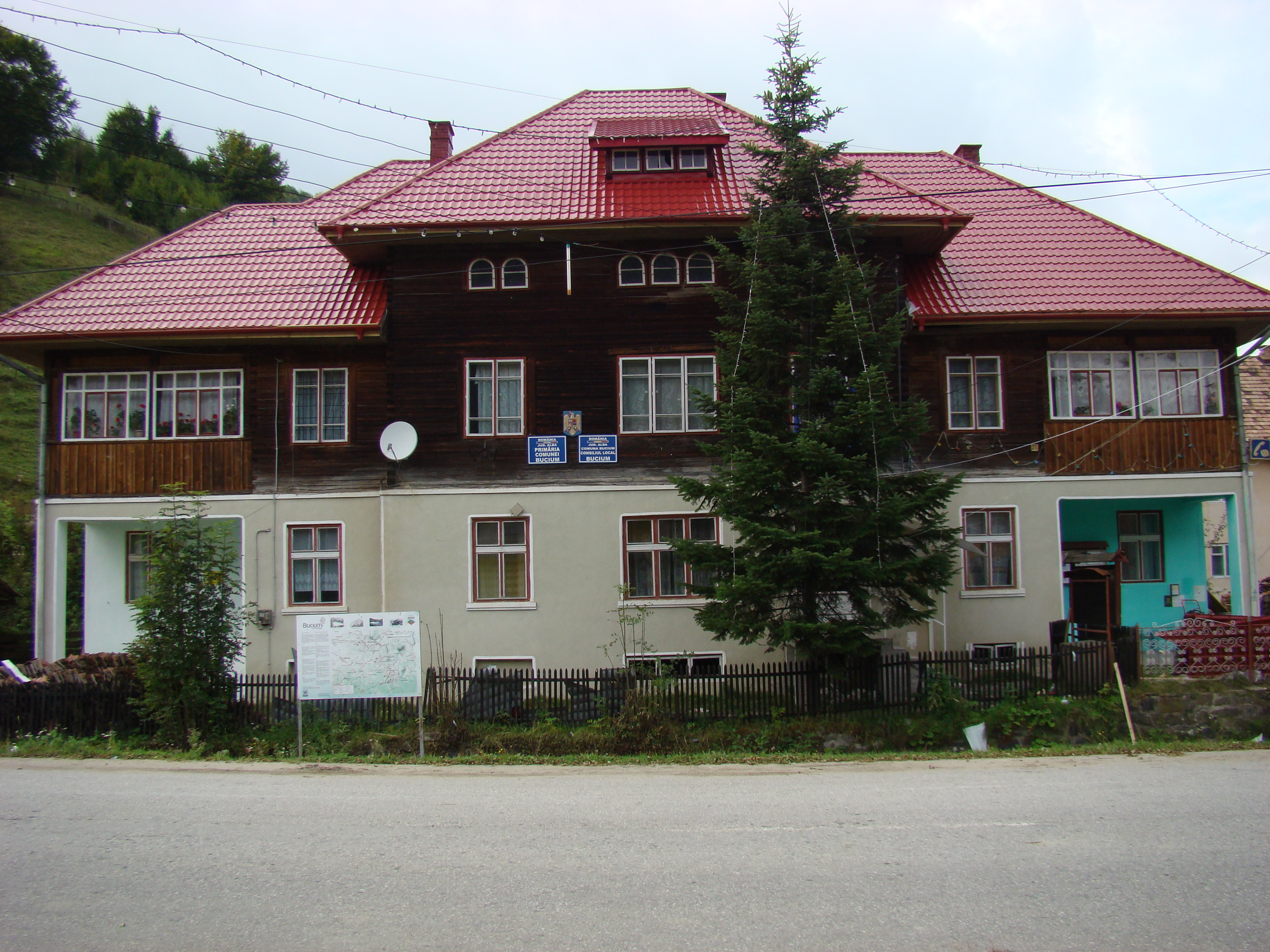
- Bucium City Hall

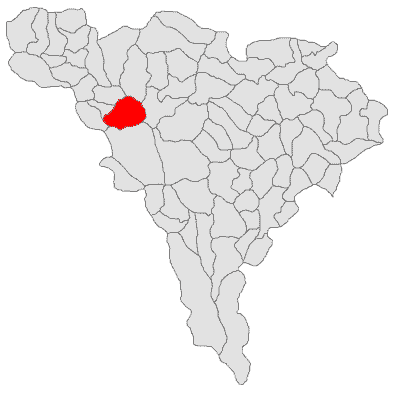
- Location in Alba County

- Location in Romania
- Coordinates: 46°15′50″N 23°10′34″E
- Country: Romania
- County: Alba

Government
  - Mayor (2020–2024): Cornel Napău (PSD)
- Area: 85.7 km^{2} (33.1 sq mi)
- Elevation: 951 m (3,120 ft)
- Population (2021-12-01): 1,272
  - Density: 14.8/km^{2} (38.4/sq mi)
- Time zone: UTC+02:00 (EET)
  - Summer (DST): UTC+03:00 (EEST)
- Postal code: 517165
- Area code: +40 x58
- Vehicle reg.: AB
- Website: comunabucium.ro

Bucium (German: Baumdorf; Hungarian: Bucsony) is a commune located in Alba County, Transylvania, Romania. It has a population of 1,272 as of 2021. It is composed of thirty villages: Anghelești, Bisericani, Bucium, Bucium-Sat (Bucsum-Szát), Cerbu (Bucsum-Cserbu), Ciuculești, Coleșeni, Dogărești, Ferești, Florești, Gura Izbitei, Helești, Izbicioara, Izbita (Bucsum-Izbita), Jurcuiești, Lupulești, Măgura, Muntari (Bucsum-Muntár), Petreni, Poiana, Poieni (Bucsum-Pojén), Stâlnișoara, Vâlcea, Valea Abruzel, Valea Albă, Valea Cerbului, Valea Negrilesii, Valea Poienii, Valea Șesii, and Văleni.

The commune is situated 10 km (6.2 mi) east of Abrud. On its territory can be found a Roman castrum, as well as the ancient open-pit mining sites at Ieruga and Gaura Perii. The Bucium gold deposits are located within the northernmost volcanic belt of the "Golden Quadrilateral," near the Roșia Montană mining town.

The physicist Ion I. Agârbiceanu was a native of Bucium. His father, the writer Ion Agârbiceanu, served as Greek-Catholic parish priest at the church in Bucium–Șasa village (now Ciuculești).

In Béla Bartók's Romanian Folk Dances, the fourth dance is called "Buciumeana", meaning a dance from Bucium.

Historical population
| Year | Pop. | ±% |
|---|---|---|
| 1850 | 3,590 | — |
| 1880 | 3,846 | +7.1% |
| 1900 | 4,634 | +20.5% |
| 1920 | 3,476 | −25.0% |
| 1941 | 4,119 | +18.5% |
| 1977 | 2,499 | −39.3% |
| 1992 | 2,115 | −15.4% |
| 2002 | 1,792 | −15.3% |
| 2011 | 1,454 | −18.9% |
| 2021 | 1,272 | −12.5% |
Source: INS, Census data
