= George Barițiu National College =

Romanian educational institute

Coordinates: 46°46′14″N 23°35′06″E

George Barițiu National College (Romanian: Colegiul Național George Barițiu) is a high school located at 10 Emil Isac Street, Cluj-Napoca, Romania, named after George Bariț.

Nearly a year after the union of Transylvania with Romania, the school opened in October 1919 by order of the Directing Council, making it the first Romanian high school in Cluj. Alexandru Ciura was the inaugural director. The school periodical was published beginning in 1923. In 1940, following the Second Vienna Award, which returned Northern Transylvania, including Cluj, to Hungary, two Romanian sections functioned in the same building, one for boys and another for girls, the latter until 1942; neither used the Barițiu name. In 1941, these were merged into a co-educational state school. In 1944, after the Hungarian occupation ended, the old name was restored and the school initially operated with eight classes of boys. It was then co-educational from 1945 to 1947.

In 1948, after the onset of the communist regime, the name of Barițiu was again dropped. In 1950, the school moved into its current building, previously a commercial high school for boys. Girls were again admitted in 1955, and the Barițiu name returned in 1957. In 1977, it became an industrial high school. In 1990, following the Romanian Revolution, this status ended, and the school began to focus on mathematics, physics, Romanian and Italian. It was declared a national college in 2000.

== People ==
=== Faculty ===
- Laszlo Alexandru
- Teodor Boșca
- Ion Chinezu
- Alexandru Ciura

=== Alumni ===
- Ion I. Agârbiceanu
- Ioan Alexandru
- Nicolae Balotă
- Teodor Boșca
- Petru Creția
- Valeriu Cristea
- Tudor Drăganu
- Emil Giurgiuca
- Dumitru Micu
- Ion Negoițescu
- Francisc Păcurariu
- Marian Papahagi
- Ion Rațiu
- Cornel Regman
- George Sbârcea
- Petre Țuțea
