= Alexandru Ciura =

Austro-Hungarian-born Romanian journalist, short story writer and priest

Alexandru Ciura (15 November 1876 – 2 March 1936) was an Austro-Hungarian-born Romanian journalist, short story writer and priest.

Born in Abrud, Ciura was descended from a long line of Greek-Catholic priests in the Țara Moților region of Transylvania; family members had fought in the 1848 revolution alongside Avram Iancu. After attending high school at Blaj and Sibiu, graduating in 1894, Ciura studied theology and philology at the University of Budapest from 1894 to 1902. He earned his degree in 1903 with a thesis on Mihai Eminescu and George Coșbuc. Ciura made his published debut with a serial that appeared in the Sibiu newspaper Tribuna in 1895. His first book, the 1903 Visuri trecute, featured sketches and ephemera. He was the first editor-in-chief of the Budapest-based Luceafărul (1902–1903), contributing assiduously until its suppression in 1914. Ciura also wrote for Lupta (Budapest), Cosânzeana, Familia, Revista politică și literară, Pagini literare, Gând românesc, and Societatea de mâine. He led the Blaj-based Unirea in 1918, transforming it into a national daily and actively using the newspaper to prepare the Great National Assembly of Alba Iulia that would proclaim the union of Transylvania with Romania. He sometimes used the pen names Al., Alfa, Simin, Petronius, and Pribeag.

Ciura taught at the Blaj Archdiocesan School from 1913 to 1918, and then directed George Barițiu High School in Cluj until his death. He was deeply involved with cultural activities under the aegis of Astra. In prose volumes such as Icoane (1906), Amintiri (1911), În război (1915), and Sub steag strein (1920), he evoked the primitive world of the Apuseni Mountains, the anxieties of the younger generation of Transylvanian Romanian intellectuals and the sufferings brought by World War I, all in a traditional manner close in theme and style to Ion Agârbiceanu.
