= Tudor Drăganu =

Romanian jurist

Tudor Drăganu (December 2, 1912 – August 21, 2010) was a Romanian jurist who specialized in constitutional law.

Born in Năsăud, in what was then Austria-Hungary, his father was linguist Nicolae Drăganu. After completing primary school in his native town, he went to George Barițiu High School in Cluj, followed by the law faculty of the University of Cluj. There, he successively worked as assistant, associate and full professor of constitutional and administrative law. He was elected an honorary member of the Romanian Academy in 2003.
