= Mircea Zaciu =

Romanian literary historian (1928–2000)

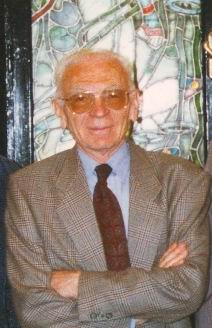
Zaciu in old age

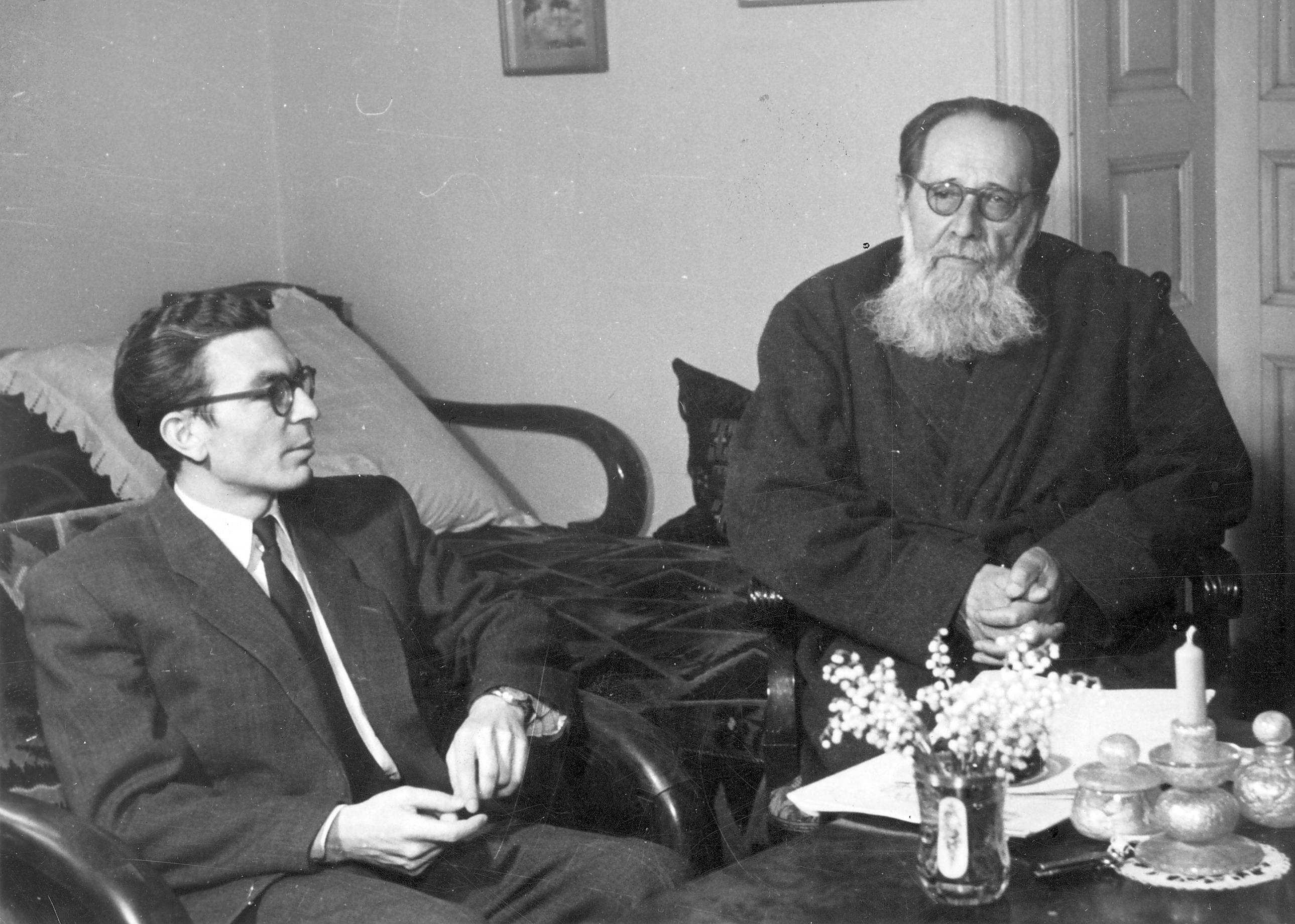
Zaciu (left) with Ion Agârbiceanu

Mircea Zaciu (August 27, 1928 – March 21, 2000) was a Romanian critic, literary historian and prose writer.

== Biography ==
Born into a Greek-Catholic family in Oradea, his parents were Adrian Zaciu, a lawyer, and his wife Otilia (née Muth), a high school secretary. The family had peasant origins in the Coaș area, and was possibly Aromanian at its roots. He attended primary school in Satu Mare from 1935 to 1939, followed by one year at Mihai Eminescu High School in the same city. Following the Second Vienna Award, when the area was ceded to Hungary, the family took refuge in Arad. There, he took years two through six at Moise Nicoară High School. He attended the final two years and graduated from Emanuil Gojdu High School in Oradea, by then back under Romanian administration. From 1947 to 1951, he attended the Romanian language and literature section of the literature faculty at the University of Cluj, earning a degree in 1952. Meanwhile, he took up but abandoned the study of law. Beginning in his fourth year, Zaciu worked as an associate instructor at the Romanian literature department, under the supervision of Dumitru Popovici.

He rose to teaching assistant (1952), assistant professor (1952-1962), associate professor (1962-1972), and full professor (1972-1990). From 1990, he was consulting professor, abandoning this role in 1997; during this period, he was thesis adviser, having twice previously been denied the position. He served as dean of the Cluj philology faculty from 1962 to 1966, and earned a doctorate in Romanian philology in 1967. From 1967 to 1970, he lectured at the universities of Cologne, Bonn and Aachen, teaching Romanian language and literature. In 1970, his contract was not renewed and he was fired from the position of chairman within the contemporary Romanian literature and literary theory department, a post he had held since 1967. He was received into the Romanian Writers' Union in 1956, forming part of its leadership for three successive terms, and again from 1990 to 1995. Through this organization, he was able to take part in conferences and colloquia in Germany, Italy, Turkey, Iraq, Denmark, and Finland. He moved to Germany in 1990, but spent lengthy periods in Romania, and from that time was honorary director of Vatra magazine, based in Târgu Mureș. In 1997, he was elected an honorary member of the Romanian Academy. He died in Cluj-Napoca.

== Work ==
Zaciu's first published work was a short biography of Duiliu Zamfirescu that appeared in Ecoul newspaper in 1944. His first prose fiction ran in Flacăra magazine in 1948, at the beginning of the communist regime, while his first book-length fictional work was the 1954 Amiaza unei revoluții. His debut non-fiction volume was Masca geniului (1967), which featured criticism and literary history. A number of further critical essays and studies, as well as works of literary history, appeared in book form: Ion Agârbiceanu (1964; second edition, revised and enlarged, 1972), Glose (1970), Colaje (1972), Ordinea și aventura (1973), Bivuac (1974), Lecturi și zile (1975), Alte lecturi și alte zile (1976), Lancea lui Ahile (1980), Cu cărțile pe masă (1981), Viaticum (1983), Clasici și contemporani (selections from previous books, 1994), Scrisori nimănui (1996), Ca o imensă scenă, Transilvania (1996; selection of prior essays about Transylvanian literature). Teritorii (1976) recorded his travel impressions; his massive diary, covering the period 1979–1989, was published in four volumes as Jurnal (I, 1993; II, 1995; III, 1996; IV, 1998); three theater plays appeared in the volume Sechestrul (1972). These were written in collaboration with Vasile Rebreanu; the two had previously worked on the screenplay for the 1965 film Gaudeamus igitur. He prepared and prefaced numerous editions of classical and contemporary Romanian authors, also putting together an anthology of Romanian short prose, Cu bilet circular (1974).

Together with Marian Papahagi and Aurel Sasu, he initiated and coordinated a dictionary of Romanian writers, Scriitori români. Mic dicționar (1978). Expanded as Dicționarul scriitorilor români, with two volumes ready for printing in 1984, the revised work was banned the following year by the communist censors. The first volume was published only in 1995, after the Romanian Revolution, with the last appearing in 2002. Zaciu coordinated the "Restituiri" collection of Editura Dacia from Cluj; after 80 titles were published from 1972 to 1985, the series was suppressed for hidden reasons. He conceived and edited the volumes Ceasuri de seară cu Ion Agârbiceanu (1982) and Liviu Rebreanu după un veac (1985). He was awarded a number of prizes: the Academy prize for literary history (1975), the Cluj writers' association prize (1970), the Writers' Union prize for literary criticism (1976; 1981), the Octav Șuluțiu Prize of Familia magazine (1992), the Bihor scientists' society prize (1993), the Satu Mare cultural prize (1994) and the Writers' Union prize for memoirs (1993). As the writers' dictionary coordinator, he won five awards in 1995: the national book salon prize, the Oradea book salon prize, the Flacăra magazine prize, the Bacău excellence prize and the Writers' Union Opera Magna prize. Mircea Zaciu, Interviuri, a volume of some forty interviews the author gave starting in 1972, was published in 2007.

== Assessment ==
Following his monograph on the work of Ion Agârbiceanu, Zaciu's criticism exclusively took the form of studies, essays and literary reviews, illustrating the author's interest both for the writings of previous centuries and for contemporary works. As a literary historian, he was devoted to an "active sentiment for tradition", analyzing older works for elements that would be taken up by later writers. His essays, invariably researched with care, had a marked ability to evoke the socio-literary environment of the period they describe, and to draw characters. In his writings, the archival sensibilities of the Cluj critical school merged with the example of George Călinescu; in his vision, literary history became a sui generis "novel" in which an era, a number of representative figures and "scenes" came alive.

When writing about current literature, Zaciu reacted promptly, with assured verdicts and sometimes veering decidedly into polemics. He cherished precision and his criticism was sometimes colored by emotion, overall balancing the cool polemicist. In his need to be an active presence in ongoing developments, Zaciu mirrored the earlier example of Eugen Lovinescu. His talent for fiction was less developed, but a fine example of his prose can be found in Teritorii, the journalistic account of his German stay, together with impressions of Paris during the turbulent year 1968 as well as London. The publication of his journal was a literary event; it detailed moments, emotional states and events from the final years of the Nicolae Ceaușescu dictatorship, which he dubbed the "Satanic decade". The diary is a valuable document for reconstituting the somber and hopeless atmosphere of those years, with special attention devoted to the writers' milieu. In often memorable sketches, he recorded its main figures and the public disguises they wore.
