= Petru Creția =

Romanian essayist, poet and translator

Petru Creția (January 21, 1927–April 15, 1997) was a Romanian essayist, poet and translator.

Born in Cluj, his parents were Aurel, a civil servant, and his wife Călina (née Humița). He started at George Barițiu High School in his native city, followed by Spiru Haret High School in Bucharest, graduating in 1945. He earned a degree in Classical Studies from the University of Bucharest in 1951. From 1952 to 1971, Creția was teaching assistant, then lecturer in classical languages at his alma mater. From 1971 to 1975, he was a researcher at the Bucharest philosophy institute. From 1975 to 1993, he worked as a researcher at the Museum of Romanian Literature.

During the June 1990 Mineriad, he addressed the protesters from the balcony of the university building overlooking University Square, and was subsequently violently beaten by the coal miners. He retired in 1993, meanwhile becoming honorary director and chief researcher at the Eminescu center in Ipotești. He died in Bucharest in 1997, aged 70.

Creția's first published article, “Sensul morții la Poe”, appeared in Națiunea in 1947. His first book, Norii (1979, definitive edition 1996) won the Writers' Union of Romania prize. His articles appeared in the magazines România Literară, Manuscriptum, Viața Românească, and Revista de filosofie. Other books included: Epos și logos (1981), commentary on comparative literature and philosophy; Poezia (1983), Pasărea Phoenix (1986); Oglinzile (1993) and Luminile și umbrele sufletului (1995) – essayistic prose; Catedrala de lumini. Homer. Dante. Shakespeare (1997), studies of literary hermeneutics regarding the Iliad, Odyssey, Divine Comedy and The Tempest.

He gained a reputation through his translations from Plato (Symposium, Phaedo, Meno and, in collaboration, Hippias Minor and Euthyphro), Plutarch, Longus, Ovid (Metamorphoses, in collaboration), Appian, Dante Alighieri (De vulgari eloquentia, Epistulae, Eclogues), Francesco Colonna, as well as modern authors: Emilio Cecchi, Massimo Bontempelli, Adriano Tilgher (Life and Immortality in the Greek Vision), Marguerite Yourcenar (Oriental Tales, 1993 – Writers' Union Prize; Alexis and The Dark Brain of Piranesi), Imre Toth (Palimpsest), François Bluche, Virginia Woolf, T. S. Eliot, John Wain, Emil Cioran (An Anthology of Portraits).

Between 1976 and 1993, together with Constantin Noica and Gabriel Liiceanu, he edited the Romanian translations of Plato. He translated five books of the Bible, taking the text attested by modern exegesis and accompanying it with commentary: Job, Ecclesiastes, Jonah, Ruth and the Song of Songs (1995). Between 1977 and 1993, Creția devoted intense work to Mihai Eminescu: establishing a text and variants for volumes VII-XVI of the complete critical edition of his writings, continuing the project initiated by Perpessicius; an introductory study, notes and commentary for volume VIII, Teatru; corrections and emendations to the princeps edition of Titu Maiorescu; the volume Teatru. Decebal. Cornul lui Decebal. Alexandru Lăpușneanu (1990), with critical analysis; the volume Constelația Luceafărului, Sonetele, Scrisorile (1994), established and commented text; he edited Poezii inedite, which appeared as a special edition of Manuscriptum in 1991. He was awarded the Romanian Academy’s Timotei Cipariu Prize for volume VII of Eminescu's works.

In 2005, the Petru Creția National Prize for History and Literary Criticism was established by the Ipotești Memorial – National Center for Mihai Eminescu Studies. The prize was awarded annually from 2006 to 2010 to researchers, literary critics and historians, and translators from Romania and the diaspora.

A street in Cluj-Napoca bears his name.
