= Ion Rațiu =

Romanian newspaper editor and politician (1917–2000)

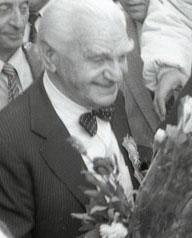
- Rațiu in the early 1990s

Member of the Chamber of Deputies of Romania
- In office 1990–2000

Personal details
- Born: Ion Augustin Nicolae Rațiu; 6 June 1917 Torda, Austria-Hungary (now Turda, Cluj County, Romania)
- Died: 17 January 2000 (aged 82) London, United Kingdom
- Resting place: Central Cemetery of Turda
- Party: National Peasants' Party (PNȚ); Christian Democratic National Peasants' Party (PNȚCD)
- Spouse: Elisabeth-Blanche Pilkington
- Children: Indrei-Stephen; Nicolae-Christopher
- Parents: Augustin Rațiu (father); Eugenia Rațiu (mother)
- Relatives: Mircea Rațiu (brother); Indrei Rațiu (son); Nicolae Rațiu (son); Tudor Rațiu (nephew)
- Education: St John's College, University of Cambridge (UK); Babeș-Bolyai University (RO)
- Occupation: Businessman, lawyer, diplomat, journalist, writer, and politician
- Known for: Re-founding the historical PNȚ as PNȚCD and contributing to the reinstatement of democracy in Romania after 1989

Ion Rațiu (Romanian pronunciation: [iˈon ˈrat͡sju]; 6 June 1917 – 17 January 2000) was a Romanian lawyer, diplomat, journalist, businessman, writer, and politician. In addition, he was the official presidential candidate of the Christian Democratic National Peasants' Party (PNȚCD) in the 1990 Romanian presidential election in which he subsequently finished third, behind the post-communist Ion Iliescu of the National Salvation Front (FSN) and Radu Câmpeanu of the National Liberal Party (PNL), with only 617,007 votes (or 4.29%).

Subsequently, on more than one occasion, he was named by major newspapers and online publications in Romania as "the best president Romania never had". During his years spent in exile, Rațiu met and discussed with important political figures of the Western world such as former British Prime Minister Margaret Thatcher (former leader of the British Conservative Party), former American President Jimmy Carter (of the American Democratic Party) as well as Republican Senate Majority Leader Bob Dole (also former presidential candidate on behalf of the Republican Party in the 1996 United States presidential election).

Although he wasn't the winner of the 1990 Romanian presidential election, Ion Rațiu successfully managed to remain in a significant part of the Romanian collective mindset as one of the most influential politicians of the 1990s, being admired and publicly revered by generations of subsequent Romanian politicians, some of whom had previously claimed to have even voted for him back in 1990, most notably, at least reportedly according to one of his books, the 5th and former President of Romania, Klaus Werner Iohannis.

== Biography ==
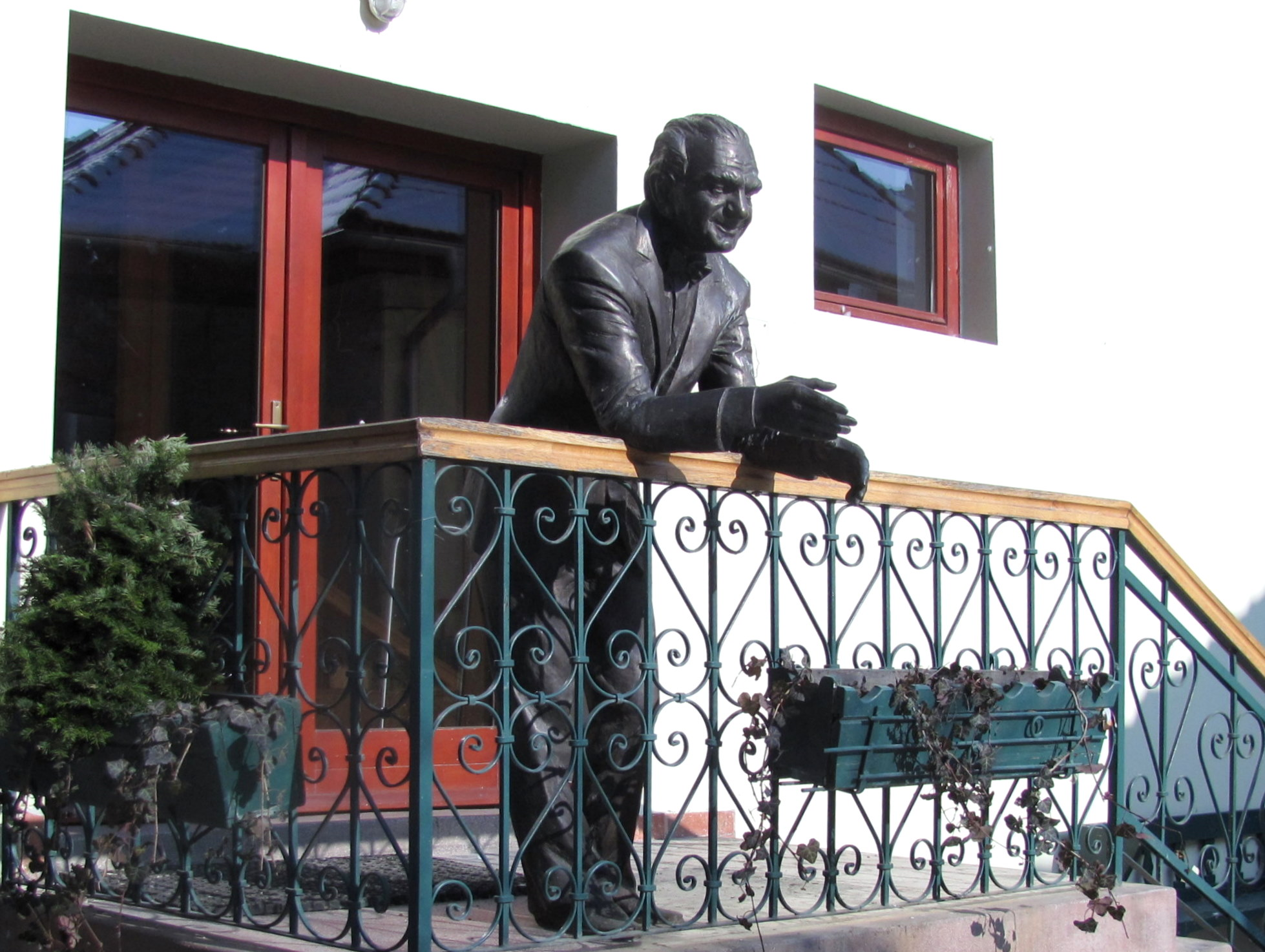
Statue of Rațiu at the Rațiu Centre for Democracy in his native Turda, Cluj County, Romania (2010)

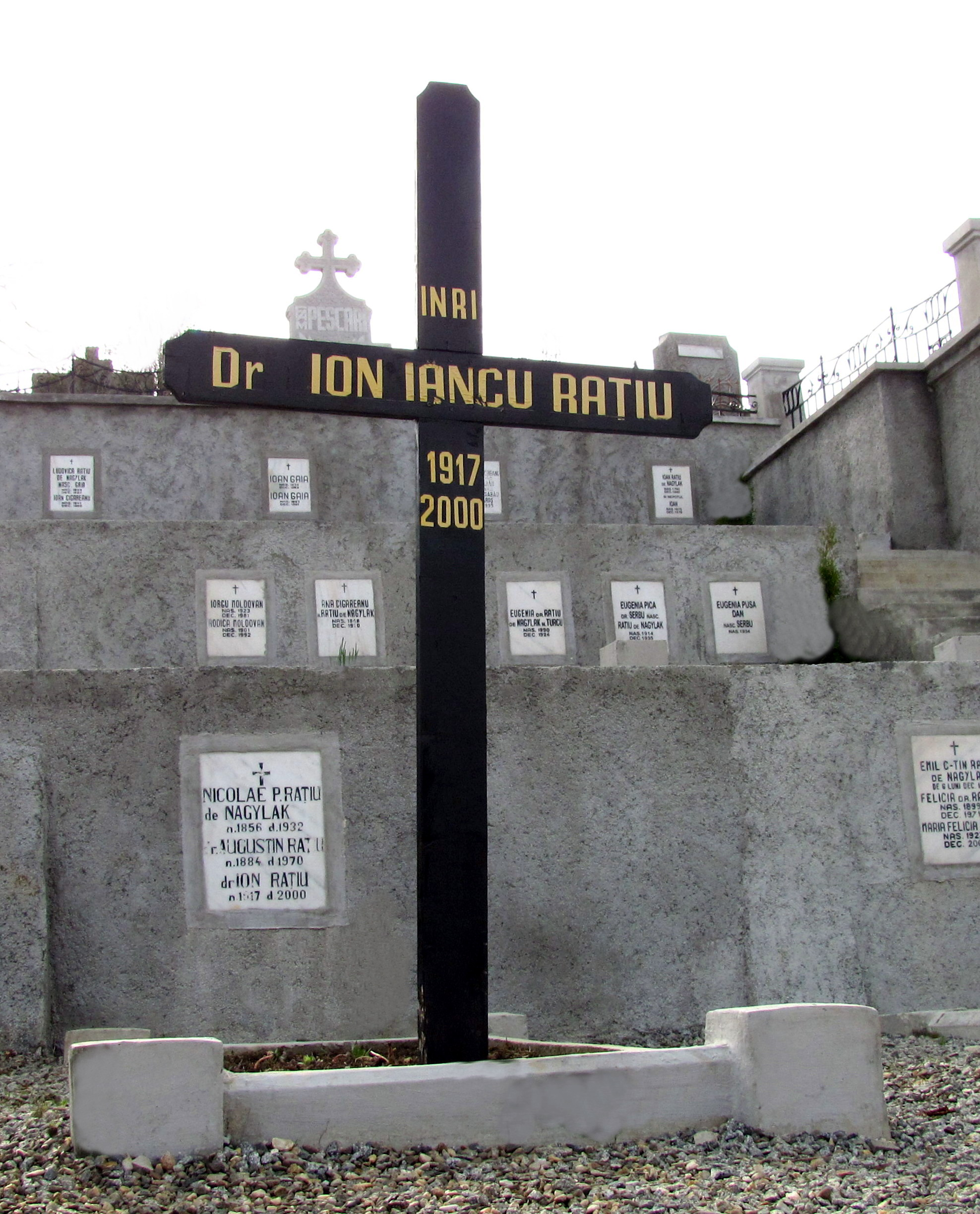
Ion Rațiu's resting place at Turda Cemetery in his native Turda

=== Early life and academic studies ===
Born in Turda, Cluj County, Romania, Ion Rațiu was the son of Dr. Augustin Rațiu, and a great-grand-nephew of Dr. Ioan Rațiu, the leader of the Transylvanian Memorandum. His grandmother, Eugenia Turcu, was the daughter of Romanian activist and journalist Ion Codru-Drăgușanu. He attended school in Turda and from 1928 to 1933 the George Barițiu High School in Cluj, and in 1938 he earned a law degree from King Ferdinand I University in Cluj.

In 1940, Rațiu was named Counsellor at the Romanian Legation in London, under Minister Viorel V. Tilea. In September 1940, King Carol II fled Romania and this led to the formation of the National Legionary State. As a result, Rațiu resigned from the Foreign Service, and requested political asylum in the United Kingdom. In 1943, Rațiu earned an economics degree from the University of Cambridge. In 1945, Rațiu married Elisabeth Pilkington, the daughter of colonel Guy Pilkington; the couple had two children, Indrei and Nicolae.

=== Life in exile in the United Kingdom after World War II ===
Rațiu remained in exile in London after the Communist Party (PCR) came to power in Romania in 1947. From the start of World War II, he joined the fight against totalitarianism of any political colour, helping to organize the Central European Student and Youth Society (or Central East European Students for a New Society).

In 1961, he started publishing the Free Romanian Press, a weekly news bulletin, in association with FCI, Holland Road, London, directed by another prominent exile, Josef Josten. He also contributed regularly to the BBC Romanian service, Radio Free Europe, and Voice of America. In 1957, Rațiu published his critique of Western attitudes towards the Soviet Union and communism, ‘Policy for the West’.

In 1975, the year he published Contemporary Romania, he decided to devote all his energy to the pursuit of a free Romania. He played a key role in the setting up of the World Union of Free Romanians (Romanian: Uniunea Mondială a Românilor Liberi), of which he was elected president at its first congress in Geneva (1984). Shortly after this, he started publishing The Free Romanian/Românul liber, a monthly newspaper in English and Romanian.

=== Political activity in post-1989 Romania ===
An electoral map of the 1990 Romanian presidential election showcasing Ion Rațiu's vote share nationwide. (Note: He obtained the highest electoral results in various counties across Banat and Transylvania (most notably Timiș, Sibiu, and Brașov) as well as in the capital of Bucharest.)

After he returned to Romania in January 1990, he helped to re-establish the National Peasants' Party (PNȚ), serving as its vice-president. Shortly thereafter, he unsuccessfully ran for president in the 1990 election on behalf of the PNȚCD while also being endorsed by the PSDR; subsequently, he was elected deputy of the Romanian Chamber of Deputies for Cluj County in both 1990 and 1992, and then Arad, in 1996. He also served as vice-president of the Chamber of Deputies as well as ambassador and negotiator for Romania's integration in NATO's structures. In 1991, he re-founded the newspaper Cotidianul.

Paraphrasing Evelyn Beatrice Hall, Rațiu offered in a televised debate in 1990 the most elegant definition of democracy: "I will fight until my last drop of blood so you have the right not to agree with me!"

After a short illness, Rațiu died in London on 17 January 2000, surrounded by his family. In accordance with his wishes, he was buried in his Transylvanian hometown, Turda.

== Publications ==
Ion Rațiu published a series of self-biographical literary volumes known as 'Jurnalul' in Romanian. The respective literary volumes (or journals), narrate and detail his life in exile in the United Kingdom as well as his comeback in post-1989 Romania and the story of his 1990 presidential candidacy respectively. In addition, Ion Rațiu also published other literary volumes such as the 'Note zilnice' series (i.e. 'Daily notes') throughout the 1990s, revolving around national politics and geopolitics. Those volumes were published through the Univers (i.e. Universe) Romanian publishing house.

== Electoral history ==
=== Presidential elections ===
| Election | Affiliation | First round | | | Second round | | |
| Election | Affiliation | Votes | Percentage | Position | Votes | Percentage | Position |
|---|---|---|---|---|---|---|---|
| 1990 | PNȚCD | 617,007 | 4.29% | 3rd | | | |
