= Cenade =

- Commune
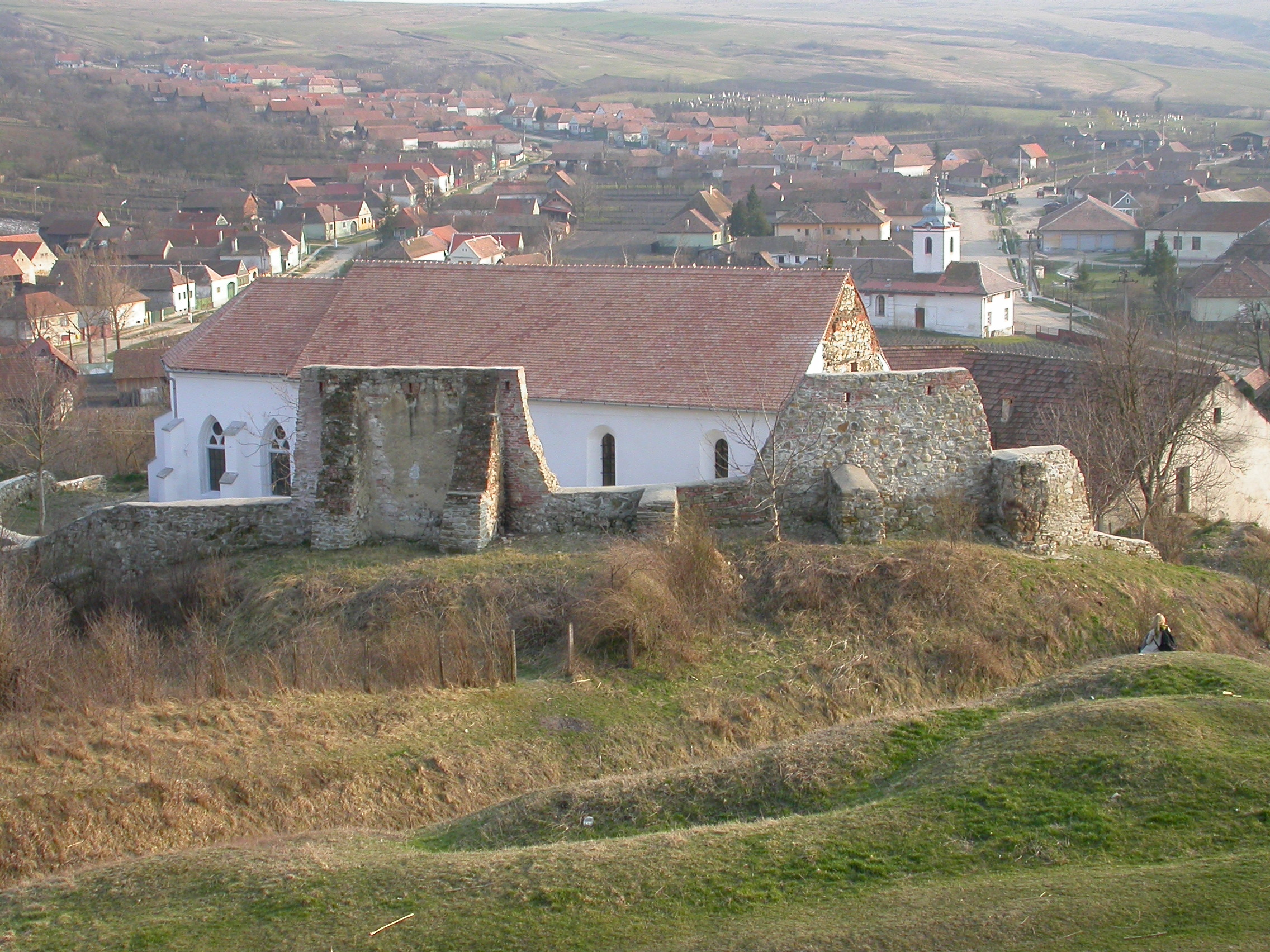
- View of Cenade

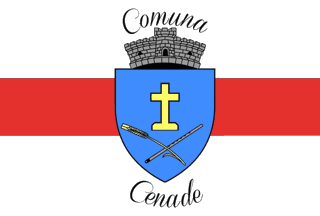
- Flag Coat of arms

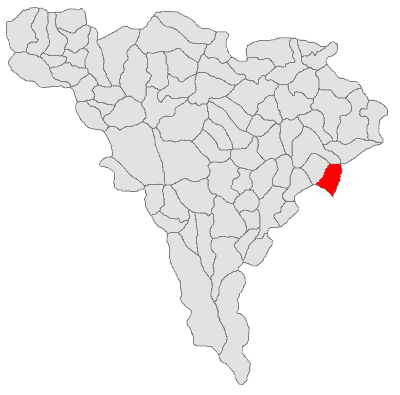
- Location in Alba County

- Location in Romania
- Coordinates: 46°03′N 24°01′E
- Country: Romania
- County: Alba

Government
  - Mayor (2020–2024): Ilie Neamțu (PNL)
- Area: 44.31 km^{2} (17.11 sq mi)
- Elevation: 320 m (1,050 ft)
- Population (2021-12-01): 1,031
  - Density: 23.27/km^{2} (60.26/sq mi)
- Time zone: UTC+02:00 (EET)
  - Summer (DST): UTC+03:00 (EEST)
- Postal code: RO–517210
- Area code: (+40) 02 58
- Vehicle reg.: AB
- Website: comunacenade.ro

Cenade (German: Scholten; Hungarian: Szászcsanád) is a commune located in Alba County, Transylvania, Romania. It has a population of 1,031 as of 2021. It is composed of three villages: Capu Dealului (Hegyitanyák), Cenade, and Gorgan.

Ion Agârbiceanu was a native of Cenade.

Historical population
Year	Pop.	±%
1850	1,423	—
1941	2,400	+68.7%
1977	1,534	−36.1%
2002	1,015	−33.8%
2011	943	−7.1%
2021	1,031	+9.3%
Source: INS, Census data
