= Ion Agârbiceanu =

Romanian writer and priest (1882–1963)

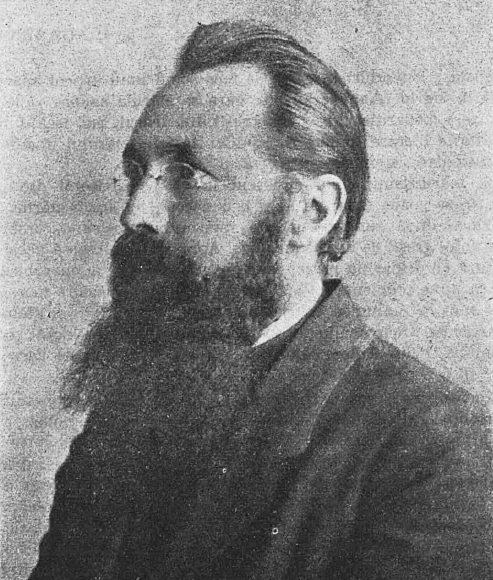
- Photograph of Agârbiceanu, published 1926
- Born: 12 September 1882; Cenade (Szászcsanád), Alsó-Fehér County, Kingdom of Hungary
- Died: 28 May 1963 (aged 80); Cluj, Romanian People's Republic
- Occupations: Priest; theologian; teacher; journalist; activist; politician; librarian
- Writing career
- Pen name: AG; Agarbi; Alfius; Potcoavă
- Period: c. 1900–1962
- Genres: Psychological novel; novella; short story; sketch story; essay; political satire; feuilleton; closet drama; fairy tale; prose poem; ballade; ode
- Movements: Sămănătorul; Poporanism

Ion Agârbiceanu (first name also Ioan, last name also Agărbiceanu and Agîrbiceanu; 12 September 1882 – 28 May 1963) was an Austro-Hungarian-born Romanian writer, journalist, politician, theologian and Greek-Catholic priest. Born among the Romanian peasant class of Transylvania, he was originally an Orthodox, but chose to embrace Eastern Catholicism. Assisted by the Catholic congregation of Blaj, he graduated from Budapest University, after which he was ordained. Agârbiceanu was initially assigned to a parish in the Apuseni Mountains, which form the backdrop to much of his fiction. Before 1910, Agârbiceanu had achieved literary fame in both Transylvania and the Kingdom of Romania, affiliating with ASTRA cultural society in 1912; his work was disputed between the rival schools of Sămănătorul and Poporanism. After a debut in poetry, he became a highly prolific author of novels, novellas, and other forms of prose, being rated as "Chekhovian" or "Tolstoyan" for his talents in describing the discreet suffering of common folk.

Agârbiceanu became involved politically with the Romanian National Party, siding with its more radical offshoot, under Octavian Goga. Committed to social and cultural activism in Transylvania, Agârbiceanu spent the 1910s officiating near Sibiu, with a break during World War I that saw him taking refuge in Russia, the Ukrainian People's Republic, and eventually the Moldavian Democratic Republic. He served as a chaplain for the Romanian Volunteer corps, and was decorated for his service. In 1919, Agârbiceanu moved to Cluj, where he lived for most of the remainder of his life. After the war, he involved himself in both the political and cultural life of Greater Romania. He moved between the National Peasants' Party, the People's Party, and the National Agrarian Party, all while remaining engaged with organizing specifically Greek-Catholic interest groups. Already in the 1920s, Agârbiceanu expressed disappointment with the cultural decline he felt was encouraged by an emerging political class, embracing instead radical-right positions and eugenics, while also demanding administrative decentralization and encouraging the peasantry to improve its economic standing. Voted into the Romanian Academy, he served terms in the Assembly of Deputies, and assumed the office of Senate vice president under the National Renaissance Front dictatorship.

As editor and columnist at Tribuna, Agârbiceanu decried Hungarian revisionism and openly supported the politics of King Carol II as a means to solidify union. He was eventually forced out of Northern Transylvania during World War II. He spent his last decade and a half under a communist regime that outlawed his church, an act in which he refused to cooperate. Much of his work, with its transparent Christian moralizing, proved incompatible with the new ideology, and was banned by communist censors; however, especially after 1953, the regime found him useful for its image, and bestowed honors upon him. He was never allowed to publish his complete works, and continued to struggle with his censors during his final years. Agârbiceanu's full contribution has been made available and reappraised since the 1990s, but he remains a largely forgotten author, with the possible exception of his Apuseni-based novella, Fefeleaga.

== Biography ==
=== Early life ===
Born in Cenade village in Transylvania's Alba County (at the time in Alsó-Fehér County), Agârbiceanu was the second of eight children; his parents were Nicolae and Ana (née Olariu). Ion's father and grandfather were both woodcutters, while he believed his great-grandparents were cowherds—as indicated by the surname of his grandfather, Vasile Bouaru, who originated in the Sibiu area. The name Agârbiceanu came from the family's ancestral village, Agârbiciu. According to various report, at least some members of the family were traditionally Orthodox, and he was himself originally baptized as such. Writer Ion Breazu argues that Ana Agârbiceanu was not tied to either Orthodoxy or Eastern Catholicism, and instead channeled a religious sentiment shared by both denominations.

Breazu describes the Agârbiceanus as engaged in the economic struggle for Romanian emancipation, with competition structured along ethnic lines. The adversaries were Saxons, Hungarians, and Hungarian Jews, who occupied positions of power: "[Agârbiceanu] would not spare any sympathy for either one of these groups, in his work as a writer." From about 1900, Nicolae became a respected forester and estate administrator, described upon his death in 1931 as a "cultured peasant". According to the novelist's own notes, his father subscribed to a number of Romanian-language publications that appeared in Transylvania. His mother, although a great lover of stories and storytelling, was illiterate.

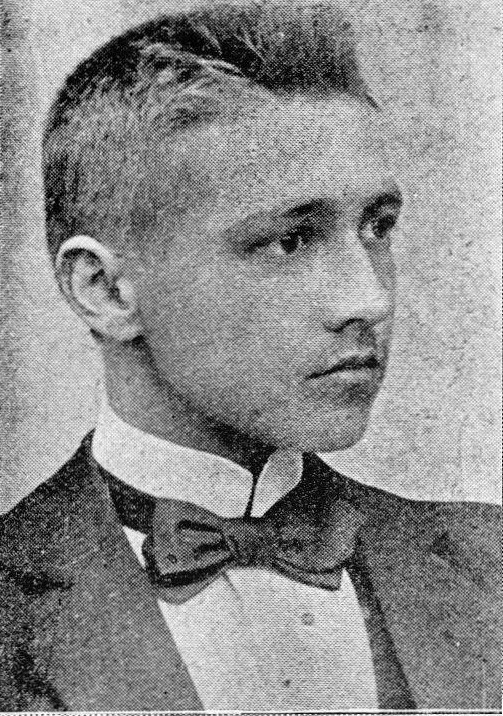
Agârbiceanu in 1900

Agârbiceanu recalled an idyllic childhood, with summers spent tending to his father's sheep and sleeping in a stick hut. An avid reader of stories by Petre Ispirescu and poems by George Coșbuc, he was also accustomed to prayer books, which would help him deal with his feeling of isolation, once he was made to attend school. He completed the primary and secondary cycles in his native village and in Blaj, graduating from the Superior Gymnasium in 1900. His teachers included Gavril Precup, who introduced Agârbiceanu to world philosophy and the tenets of Romanian nationalism, and Ambrosiu Chețianu, who cultivated his taste for natural sciences. His later works suggest that, aged eleven, Agârbiceanu was in the Romanian crowd which greeted the Transylvanian Memorandum leaders, arrested by the Hungarian authorities and paraded through Blaj.

During fifth-grade classes in Romanian, Precup noticed Agârbiceanu's skill as the pupil read his own review of Vasile Alecsandri's poem, Bărăganul. His actual debut was a collaboration with Unirea newspaper. There, Agârbiceanu published a feuilleton (signed as Alfius), poetry, and, in 1900, the short story "În postul Paștelui" ("At Lent"). Agârbiceanu also served as secretary of the Blaj Literary Society, at the time the city's only Romanian-speaking literary body still tolerated by the Hungarian administration. He was matched in these activities by his older brother Nicolae Jr, who in 1902–1907 was putting out a handwritten magazine, Steluța; this Nicolae died shortly after, while studying abroad (at the University of Graz).

Ion soon became a correspondent of Rĕvașul, a Cluj-based newspaper, signing his first pieces there with the pen name Alfius, then as Agarbi or Potcoavă ("Horseshoe"). One of his essays there, published when he was aged twenty, was a critique of social democracy (defining its adherents as "enemies of Jesus Christ [and] of any people, save the Jews"), with some praise reserved for Christian socialism as a non-revolutionary alternative. Agârbiceanu also noted that the Hungarian Social Democrats could not prevail among the Romanians, despite the success of propagandists in "duping" some destitute Transylvanians: "When has our salvation ever come from a kike, and not even from a kike, but from any sort of foreigner?" In other pieces, Agârbiceanu denounced publicist Imre Salusinszky for his claims that social democracy was compatible with the Romanians' Christian faith.

Agârbiceanu formally converted to Eastern Catholicism as a youth, but, according to his own testimony, was secretly an atheist during much of his adolescence. The Blaj-based Făgăraș and Alba Iulia Archdiocese arranged for Agârbiceanu to study at the theology faculty of Budapest University between 1900 and 1904. As he himself confessed later in life, it was here that he became truly convinced of his faith and calling, with a self-described theophany. It was also at this stage that he became fluent in Hungarian, having already picked up German and Latin at Blaj, and continuing his individual study of Italian and French. His reading list widened to cover the classics of modern French and Russian literature—absorbing themes and elements of style from Balzac, Gogol, Dostoevsky, Flaubert, and Count Tolstoy. Publishing more works in Tribuna and Familia, he soon became "the most constant presence" in Luceafărul of Budapest, which hosted in 1912 his first version of the novel Legea trupului ("The Law of the Flesh"). Agârbiceanu returned to Blaj after his graduation and supervised the local boys' boarding school, working there during the 1904–1905 academic year. Urged by friends and receiving a church scholarship, he returned to Budapest to study literature. He spent just one semester there, during which he also taught primary school catechism. In March 1906, he married Maria Reli Radu, the daughter of an archpriest from Ocna Mureș.

Also in 1906, following an ordination ceremony held on Easter Sunday, Agârbiceanu was appointed parish priest in Bucium, in the Apuseni Mountains. For four years, he observed the difficult lives of the mountain dwellers and the problems encountered in the nearby gold mines. As parish administrator, he took steps to increase the pay of schoolteachers; from 1907, he was also curator of the village library, an endowment of the Reunion of Romanian Women. During this time, he wrote several notices in the magazine Ramuri, later published as În întuneric ("Into the Darkness", 1910), the novella Fefeleaga, and the novel Arhangelii ("The Archangels"), all of them based on the mining experience. He also started writing frequently for literary magazines that included Luceafărul, Unirea and Lupta. His other literary works of the period include De la țară ("From the Countryside", 1906), În clasa cultă ("In the Cultured Class", 1909), Două iubiri ("Two Loves", 1910), Prăpastia ("The Abyss", 1912), and a collection of Schițe și povestiri ("Sketches and Short Stories", 1912).

=== PNR recruitment and World War I ===
Agârbiceanu visited Bucharest, the Old Kingdom capital, in 1906, and sent enthusiastic travel notes for Unirea. At the kingdom's Jubilee Expo, he chanced upon critic Eugen Lovinescu, who recalled him as visibly a "poet's soul [...] descended from his mountains into the citadel of our worries, pride, and aspirations." He became a regular contributor to the Bucharest nationalist review Sămănătorul, which gave De la țară a sonorous welcome, and later to Sămănătorul's leftist rival, Viața Românească. As Agârbiceanu recalled some fifty years later, his indifference to the ideological clash between the two clubs caused him to be publicly reprimanded by Nicolae Iorga of Sămănătorul, who never fully pardoned his transgression. With his occasional investigations of life in the Old Kingdom before and after the 1907 peasants' revolt, Agârbiceanu also turned to critiquing its institutions. One of his first contributions in Iorga's Neamul Românesc magazine was an article celebrating King Carol I's decision to pardon the rebels, and joining in the array of voices demanding more, and more substantial, reforms. From 1909, after reconciling with Iorga, he was also one of the regular writers for that magazine.

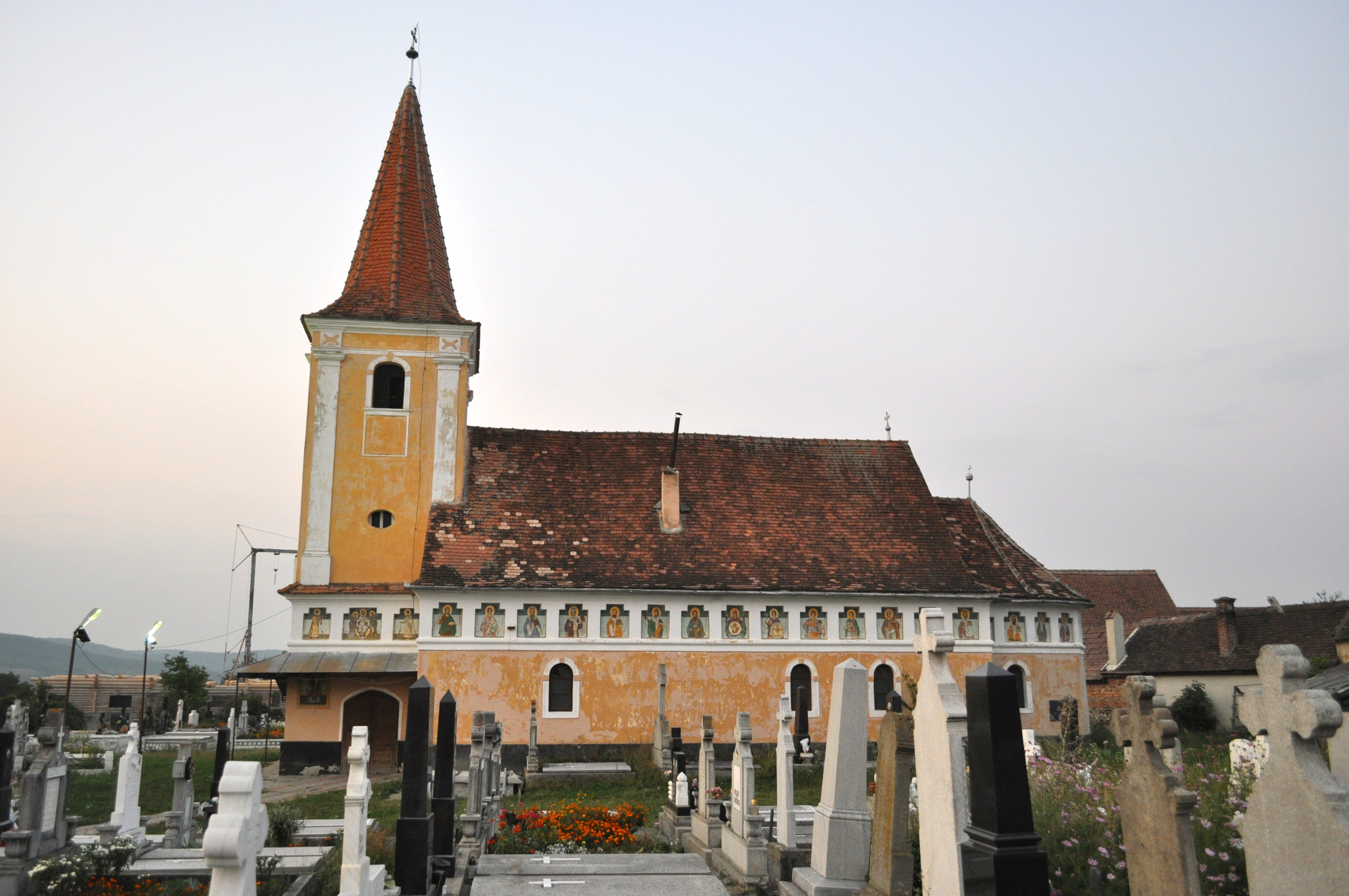
Saint Nicholas Church in Orlat, where Agârbiceanu served during the 1910s

From 1910 to 1916 (nominally to 1919), Agârbiceanu was parish priest at Orlat in Szeben County. He traveled frequently to neighboring villages—including Gura Râului, where he met and became close friends with literary critic Ilarie Chendi. During this interval, Agârbiceanu also became interested in professional politics, as a member of Austria-Hungary's Romanian National Party (PNR). Ideologically, he supported PNR youth leader Octavian Goga, his colleague at Luceafărul and Tribuna. In 1910, he followed Goga as he parted from the PNR and launched his own independent faction. As reported at the time by Chendi, Agârbiceanu was fully committed to Goga's radical-nationalist agenda, to the point where anyone who had earned Goga's favors could also count on Agârbiceanu's loyalty. Agârbiceanu reputedly refused to write for the more centrist PNR newspaper, Românul (which favored boycotting elections for the Diet of Hungary, rather than political confrontation), even after being offered an increase in pay; the accuracy of this claim was publicly denied by the PNR leader, Vasile Goldiș, who went on to accuse Agârbiceanu of "betrayal".

In November 1912, the two groups reached an uneasy settlement: Agârbiceanu headlined a Românul announcement which promised that Goga's men would return to writing for the PNR's mainstream press. He was subsequently allowed to join the editorial boards of both Românul and Poporul Român. For his parallel literary activity, Agârbiceanu was elected a corresponding member of ASTRA in 1912, and was promoted to full membership in 1925. In 1911, he had also been awarded the Romanian Academy's Eliade-Rădulescu Prize for În întuneric; Anton Naum authored the committee's favorable report. However, his literature was also becoming the focus of attacks by the Neoclassical novelist Duiliu Zamfirescu, who, as part of a larger critique of Poporanism, alleged that Agârbiceanu was unreadable.

By the time World War I broke out, Agârbiceanu had three sons and a daughter, including Ion Jr, the future physicist. During 1914, the first year of war, he finally published Arhanghelii, as well as the stories in De la sate ("From the Villages"). These were followed, in 1916, by a work of Christian theology, Din viața preoțească ("From Priestly Life"). In September 1916, during the Battle of Transylvania, his Orlat house was shelled by the German Army; Agârbiceanu fled Austria-Hungary with his family, following the Romanian Army on its hasty retreat. Their first destination was Râmnicu Vâlcea in the Old Kingdom; they then headed for Roman in Western Moldavia. Similarly exiled and sheltered, Goga put out the propaganda paper Gazeta Ostașilor, with contributions from both Agârbiceanu and Iorga; after a hiatus caused by the fall of Bucharest in December, it was reissued as România in February 1917.

Alongside other Transylvanians whom the Romanian authorities wished to protect from the likelihood of being captured by the Austro-Hungarian Army, the family was evacuated to Russia in August 1917. As reported by Onisifor Ghibu, on 4–5 August they were still stranded with their train at Ungheni. The Agârbiceanus finally settled near Yelisavetgrad in Kherson Governorate. The writer personally witnessed the life of Romanians in southern Ukraine, leaving notes on their exceptional agricultural skills, and implying that they were seen as a superior caste in Kherson's society. He proposed that the "Moldavians" he encountered here were Romanians of the "Nordic type"; though they never self-defined as "Romanian", and were "devoid of any geographical knowledge", they were fully aware of their kinship with the refugee group. He also noticed that they were generally much better fed than Romanians of Bihar and Máramaros, with fresh bread consumed each day and no signs of rickets. While there and alongside other refugee Transylvanians, Agârbiceanu took part in a choir organized by Nicolae Colan, a future bishop in the Orthodox Church. In researching Romanian folklore as found in the villages outside Yelisavetgrad, he introduced local Moldavians to the Păcală stories, while noticing that they were already familiar with Prâslea the Brave and some could still recite Plugușorul.

Agârbiceanu was condemned by the loyalist leaders of his church for his defection, and "endured unimaginable hardships" as a result, having special trouble in providing for his children. For a while, he felt depressed and "entirely unsupported", preparing his and his family's emigration to America. He continued to write at a steady pace in his places of exile, completing as many as eight books during wartime (all of which were to be published in later years), and returning as a contributor to Neamul Românesc, published out of Iași. After having been evicted from the newly formed Ukrainian People's Republic later in 1917, the Agârbiceanu family found shelter with in Borogani village, near Leova in Bessarabia (which, though peopled by Romanian speakers, was still governed as a Russian Governorate). They occupied rooms in a manor owned by the Macrea family, with an understanding that they would spend the winter. According to one report by Ovid Țopa, who was serving in the Bessarabian Directorate for Schools and Churches, he and other Romanian activists obtained that Agârbiceanu be assigned as priest to an Orthodox church in downtown Chișinău; none of his parishioners was ever aware that he was a Catholic. The October Revolution soon broke out, and the Agârbiceanus made their way back to Moldavia, where Ion became a military chaplain for the Hârlău-based Romanian Volunteer Corps in Russia. In December, Bessarabia proclaimed self-rule as the Moldavian Democratic Republic, and began the process of Romanianizing its educational system. In that context, Agârbiceanu was formally presented with an offer to take up a teaching job of one of the Bessarabian high schools. In January 1918, at a time when Bessarabia could embark on its merger into Romania, Agârbiceanu joined Nichifor Crainic, Ion Minulescu, Radu D. Rosetti, Mihail Sadoveanu, Mihail Sorbul and various other writing professionals in calling for the cultural unification of all Romanian-inhabited regions.

The following month, as Goga sunk into depression and prepared to leave the country altogether, Agârbiceanu took temporary office as the unsigned editor of România. He was still living in Hârlău as Romania surrendered to the Central Powers—news of which reached him only with a significant delay. By August 1918, he had been approached by General Alexandru Averescu of the People's League (later known as "People's Party"): Averescu outlined his plan for a sweeping land reform and a political coup; while Agârbiceanu did not disagree with this agenda, he insisted that the League be reformed to include only "true nationalists and democrats". In October, he was again living at Roman, where he and G. Caliga founded the newspaper Vestea Nouă, but often visited his fellow priest Ioan Bălan in Iași. It was during one of these journeys that he fell ill with the Spanish flu, which Bălan treated with leftover pills provided by a French nun. Agârbiceanu was at Iași when Romania announced her reentry into the war, which saw Romanian troops moving into Transylvania. He returned to Orlat in December 1918, days after the union of Transylvania with Romania. He was enthusiastic about the unionist process, describing it in Neamul Românesc as the culmination of efforts by "all the long-gone sowers, the teachers and apostles of yesteryear, that whole sacrifice made by a Romanian generation in its entirety."

=== At Patria ===
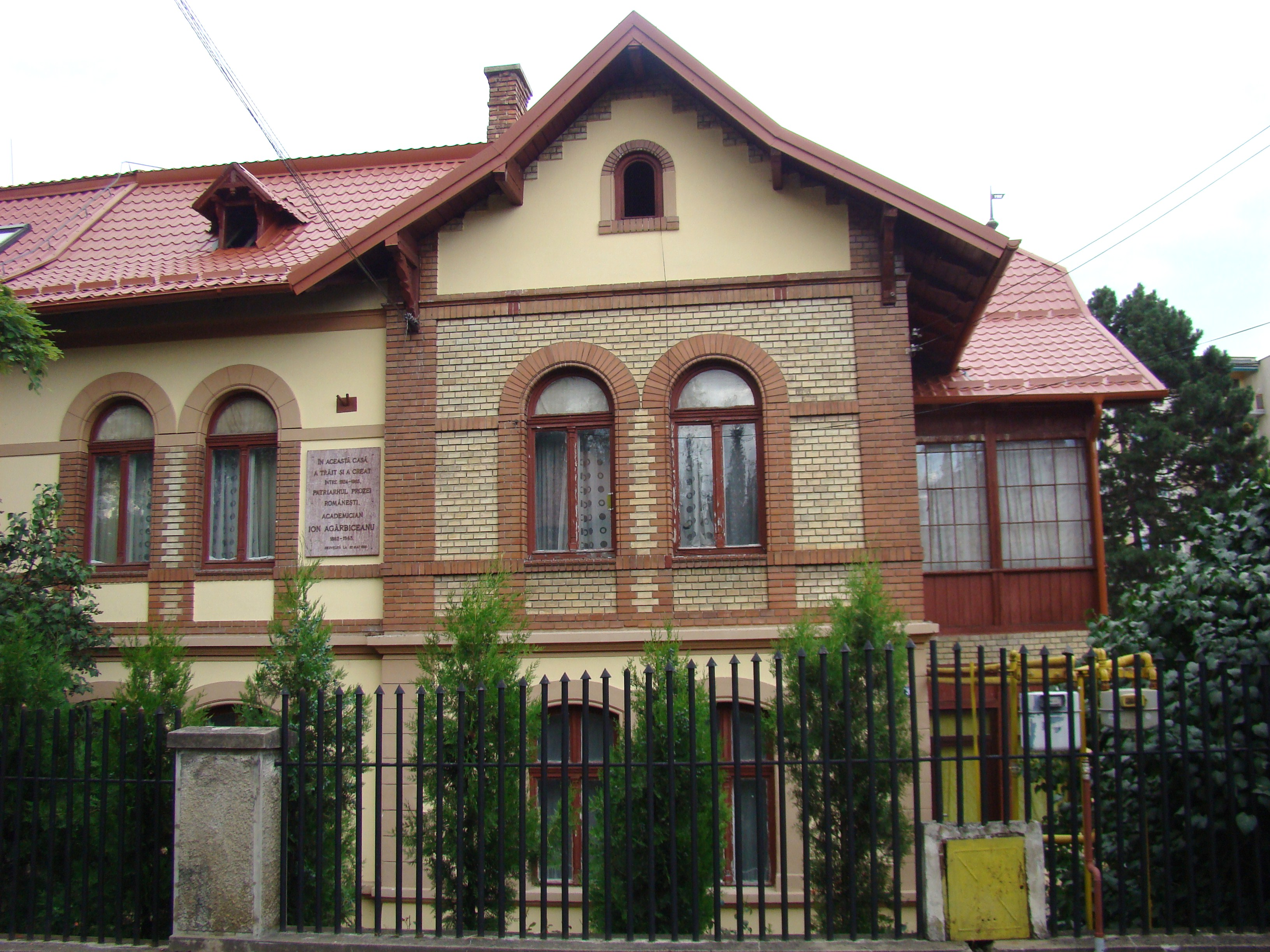
Agârbiceanu's villa in Cluj, where he lived from 1924 until his death

In late 1918, immediately after returning from exile, Agârbiceanu collected his patriotic articles as the brochure O lacrimă fierbinte ("A Burning Tear"). For his role in combat, Agârbiceanu was made a Knight of the Order of the Crown in April 1919. In March, he had been named director of Patria newspaper, which was edited by the province's Directing Council. One of his articles was an homage to Iorga and other Old-Kingdom nationalists, highlighting the "absolute necessity of for the convergent labor of all that is sound and healthy in our Romanian nation." In his other editorials of 1919, he chided Transylvanians for their claims of moral superiority, while acknowledging that the Old Kingdom had endemic issues with corruption. Another piece welcomed the debut of poet Lucian Blaga, and was remembered by the latter as "one of my life's greatest joys". Overall, Agârbiceanu was dissatisfied with his activity in journalism, but found himself unable to walk out. In 1962, he noted: "from as early as the first days of 1919, I was asked to find employment in journalism, and, as it turns out, political journalism, as there was no independent kind to speak of. I found myself writing not sketches and stories, but daily political articles, draining me of my literary inspiration for almost a decade."

In October 1919, the newspaper's headquarters moved to Cluj, and Agârbiceanu followed. Thanks to his literary activity, he was part of the leadership of the Romanian Writers' Society, and was elected corresponding member of the Romanian Academy in May 1919. The proposal was advanced by Ioan Lupaș, a fellow PNR man, and seconded by linguist Sextil Pușcariu, who gave the reception speech. In November of that year, Agârbiceanu became a junior member of the PNR Executive Committee, to which he was reconfirmed in March 1920. Though he considered moving to Bucharest as a parish priest in 1920, his wife disliked the accommodations, and he decided against it. He was at the time contributing to the reviews Gândirea of Cluj, and Flacăra and Cuget Românesc of Bucharest. In 1922, he accompanied other Writers' Society members on a celebratory tour of Transylvania. Like several of his colleagues, Agârbiceanu preserved a bitter memory of the war, and his articles of the time make a point of referring to the Hungarians as a "barbarian horde".

Also in 1922, Agârbiceanu joined the editorial staff of Iorga's Ramuri and Drum Drept, which were bound together as a single weekly magazine (put out from Craiova), and where he was also the main contributor of literary prose. Though additionally working on the Sibiu-based ASTRA magazine Transilvania (where he sometimes used the signature AG), he remained the editor of Patria until 1927, and also resumed his collaboration with Viața Românească. He was disappointed by the cultural and economic decline which came as a consequence of Transylvania's incorporation: the local press, he noted, had largely lost its purpose and could not hope to survive competition. This stance was reviewed by Hungarian-Romanian intellectual Sándor Keresztury, who wrote about the "greatest living Romanian storyteller in Transylvania" documenting the collapse of regional cultural institutions. As noted by reviewers from Ilie Rad to Răzvan Voncu, some of Agârbiceanu's more valuable work saw print in minor provincial reviews.

Despite such setbacks, Agârbiceanu published new works in quick succession: Popa Man ("Father Man", 1920), Zilele din urmă ale căpitanului Pârvu ("Captain Pârvu's Latter Days", 1921), Luncușoara din Păresemi ("The Little Meadow of Păresemi", 1921), Păcatele noastre ("Our Sins", 1921), Trăsurica verde ("Green Gharry", 1921), Chipuri de ceară ("Wax Figures", 1922). These were followed by Stana (1924), Visările ("Reveries", 1925), Dezamăgire ("Disappointment", 1925), Singurătate ("Loneliness", 1926), by a definitive version of Legea trupului (also 1926), then by Legea minții ("The Law of the Mind", 1927), Ceasuri de seară ("Evening Hours", 1927), Primăvara ("Spring", 1928), Robirea sufletului ("A Soul's Bondage", 1928), and Biruința ("Victory", 1931). His other works of the period include various tracts on biblical topics, including homilies and discussions of theodicy: Ieșit-a semănătorul ("A Sower Went Out to Sow His Seed", 1930), Rugăciunea Domnului ("Lord's Prayer", 1930), Răul în lume ("Evil in the World", 1931), Preacurata ("The Immaculate", 1931), Căile fericirii ("Paths toward Happiness", 1931).

A member of the PNR Executive Committee in 1919, Agârbiceanu presented himself for the elections of November—the first ones following the creation of Greater Romania. He took a seat the Assembly of Deputies for Târnava-Mare County, receiving "much applause" with his first speech. At that stage, he supported fusing the PNR, the Democratic Nationalists, and the Peasants' Party into a political monolith, going against wishes expressed by PNR leader Iuliu Maniu. In early 1920, he and Sever Dan split with the PNR's mainstream in agreeing to support Averescu as Prime Minister of Romania, objecting in particular to the attempted rapprochement between the Nationalist opposition and the National Liberal Party. During the repeat elections of May, he was able to win a PNR seat at Aiud—a chiefly Orthodox fief where the party's Catholic elite still had much prestige. However, as editor of Patria he found himself mediating religious disputes, after initially allowing Lupaș to criticize Catholicism in its pages. In 1925, he was accused by Goldiș of pushing Catholic propaganda, after articles in which Agârbiceanu criticized Orthodox missionaries for their work in Transylvania.

Alongside Goldiș and Lupaș, Agârbiceanu was vocal in demanding the preservation of Transylvanian liberties against Old-Kingdom centralism. This pitted them against other Transylvanians, who accepted a more solid unification. In early 1922, retired PNR activist Ioan Mihu accepted a visit from the three men in Orăștie, but only as a formal gesture of diplomacy, privately referring to them as "autonomists" and "Bolsheviks". Reelected to the Assembly in March 1922, Agârbiceanu tried to oppose the new Constitution, which he and his party defined as "absolutist". His speeches in the Assembly alleged that unification had made Transylvanians victims of cronyism and of wanton violence by the Gendarmerie, suggesting that "hatred of this system" was rising throughout the region. For his public attempts to obstruct voting, he had to be escorted out of the parliamentary hall during one session in March 1923. Agârbiceanu still viewed himself as strongly opposed to the dissolution of Greater Romania, and in particular to the revisionist policy embraced by the Kingdom of Hungary. At Patria, he engaged in a polemic with Constantin Costa-Foru, who had published reports detailing alleged human right abuses by the Romanian state; though Agârbiceanu censured nationalist students for physically assaulting Costa-Foru in 1925, he agreed with them that Costa-Foru's writings provided fodder to the revisionist campaign. According to the political and literary columnist Gheorghe Bogdan-Duică, Agârbiceanu also spoke for the PNR's Catholic wing in objecting to a fusion with the Peasantists, at a time when most of his Orthodox colleagues supported it.

Late in 1923, Agârbiceanu was involved in by-elections for the Senate at Reghin, ensuring victory for a PNR ally, Vasile Stroescu. He himself served in the Assembly until 1926, while also obtaining reelection as a member of the PNR Executive Committee. In 1923, he and Patria clashed with the local structures of the PNR, for publishing a notice that Sever Dan's brother, Liviu, was collecting a state salary in Cojocna, without ever showing up for work. His political stances continued to fluctuate, and, by 1925, he was using Patria to defend Maniu in his conflict with Goga, drawing controversy with his apparent claim that the latter was a more minor figure in Romanian nationalist politics. Initially joining the National Peasants' Party (PNȚ) ultimately formed by the PNR and the Peasantists in 1926, Agârbiceanu left in March 1927, allegedly because he felt "disgusted" by the group's practices. He then joined Averescu's People's Party, of which Goga was also a member.

=== Radical nationalism ===
Defaced flag of Romania, as used by Șoimii Carpaților

In June 1927, the Știrbey cabinet appointed Agârbiceanu as the official "cultural propagandist" in Transylvania. Also a recipient of the National Prize for Literature, he headed the Cluj chapter of ASTRA and edited Transilvania to 1928. It was in this magazine that he wrote a number of articles in support of eugenics, calling on priests to promote the movement in their parishes. Given the secular values of the movement's leaders in Romania, his participation was somewhat incongruous, but Agârbiceanu did not see a conflict between his religious creed and a current centered around supposedly objective natural laws. From 1930, he participated in ASTRA's literary section and headed its cultural congress, in which capacity he lectured on the organization's role in Romanian cultural life. Additionally, he played a prominent role during its annual congresses and committed himself to social activism. That year, Iuliu Hațieganu set up Șoimii Carpaților as ASTRA's children's organization, asking Agârbiceanu to contribute as educator on spiritual matters. Also during that period, Agârbiceanu's homage to Queen Marie of Romania was included in the national primer.

The novelist was also involved in ASTRA's literacy campaigns, inspecting and fundraising for village libraries in places such as Aleșd. His critique of modern life and the constitutional system extended into the realm of language policy: with a series of articles published in Goga's Țara Noastră in 1928, he argued that political journalism had destroyed linguistic honesty; he also complained that parliamentary procedures were perfunctory, "even when speakers are in the opposition." Ahead of elections in December 1928, Agârbiceanu restated his mistrust toward the political system, this time aimed against the PNȚ. He argued that Maniu, recently appointed Prime Minister, had inherited a policy of terror which prevented peasant voters from even considering voting for the opposition; he also claimed that the party was undergoing a shift toward the left and far-left, with dangerous consequences for the country as a whole.

His cultural preoccupation extended into Bessarabia, which had by then been merged into Greater Romania. With editorial pieces in Cuvânt Moldovenesc (1929–1930), he called on Bessarabians to relearn Romanian and purge it of Eastern Slavic loanwords. His report on the Romanians of Yelisavetgrad, carried by Transilvania in 1928, included his thoughts on the need to maintain contact with the isolated community: Agârbiceanu proposed that Romania approach the Soviet Union with offers to mass-educate children in the Moldavian ASSR. However, in a 1930 issue of Țara Noastră, he denounced the Soviets' intensified anti-religious campaign, asking for "Christian solidarity in the face of Red insanity." His press contributions also included sporadic attempts in theater criticism, including his 1928 articles on the two dramatizations of the Meșterul Manole myth, respectively provided by his friends Goga and Blaga.

Also in 1930, Agârbiceanu was elevated to the rank of archpriest for the Cluj district, and in 1931, he became canon for the Cluj-Gherla Diocese. In November 1931, he was in Oradea, where gave the opening sermon and a report "on the gutter press" for the national congress of AGRU (a Greek-Catholic lay organization modeled on the Fédération Nationale Catholique). He still affiliated with the People's Party, and, during the general election of May, headlined its list in Sălaj. In 1932, after inner-party schisms, he followed Goga into the new National Agrarian Party. In so doing, he lost control over Patria to ASTRA's Ion Clopoțel. He was nevertheless upset by Octavian and Veturia Goga's corruption, and in particular by their dealings with King Carol II. Shortly after the election of 1932, he returned into the PNȚ and was considered by its leader, Maniu, for a leadership position at AGRU. At a congress in Dej during October 1933, he was elected chair of the AGRU Press Committee, which was tasked with founding a Catholic daily. He returned to publishing with Răbojul lui Sf. Petre ("Saint Peter's Tally"), a feuilleton in Societatea de Mâine (1931–1932), reissued as a volume in 1934. After 1934, he was one of the noted contributors to the official literary magazine, Revista Fundațiilor Regale, put out in Bucharest by Paul Zarifopol.

In November 1933, Agârbiceanu officiated with the Orthodox priest Elie Dăianu at the funeral of Amos Frâncu, informal leader of the Moți community and long-time rival of the PNȚ. Agârbiceanu himself was becoming a noted critic of the National Liberal governments which took power in 1933. By July 1935 he was involved with a mass movement of priests opposing the reduction of state salaries for all clergy, though he also stood out among the clergy for also proposing that those found guilty of lassitude should be stripped of their pay. The same month, with an article in Adevărul, he defended Greek-Catholic priest Iuliu Hossu, a PNL sympathizer, from libelous claims published by his own party press. In November of the following year, he was present at the Cluj Reunion of Romanian Craftsmen, Traders and Workers, an event monitored by Siguranța police for its airing of far-right and nationalist grievances. He expanded on his social criticism with a new set of articles in Universul daily, all of them published before 1940. As an AGRU representative, he was opposed to Orthodox proposals for a rapprochement between the Romanian churches and, in July 1936, wrote that reunification could only mean communion with Rome. The Orthodox staff writer at Renașterea responded: "When 'theologians' will learn to keep out [of the issue], the people shall proclaim a union of the most simple and natural kind, as dictated by its governing common sense."

In February 1937, the fascist Iron Guard made a public display of its popularity with the Moța–Marin funeral cortege. Agârbiceanu was on show at its station in Cluj, paying his respects on behalf of the Greek-Catholic Church. This period ended in a clash between Carol II and the Guard. In late 1938–early 1939, having outlawed all parties, Carol set up his own National Renaissance Front (FRN). Agârbiceanu embraced the authoritarian constitution of February 1938, lecturing about its merits at ASTRA. He was enthusiastic about the introduction of corporate statism, with which the "great electoral bargain" could come to an end. As he put it, in the constitutional plebiscite, "only five thousands people throughout the country were on show to vote against it. And these did so by error, or for who knows what sort of delusion." Rumors circulated that the king considered Agârbiceanu, alongside Nicolae Brînzeu and Victor Macaveiu, as representatives of the Greek-Catholic clergy in the FRN Superior Council, but that he ultimately decided against it, simply appointing Agârbiceanu to the revamped Senate. He went on to serve as Senate vice president, allegedly collecting a monthly income of 150,000 lei. From 1938 to 1940, Agârbiceanu edited a new edition of Tribuna in Cluj, as both the FRN's official paper and Transylvania's only daily.

=== World War II ===
Eugen Titeanu, as the FRN Minister of Propaganda, argued in November 1938 that Agârbiceanu and his paper stood to "reunite all shades of cultural forces in Transylvania". Though Tribuna declared itself apolitical, it spoke passionately against the insurgent Iron Guard. It hosted pieces condemning political violence and asking for "de-solidarization" with the movement; editorial opinion signed by Agârbiceanu, included the promise of a "Romanian sort of vengeance" for assassination of Armand Călinescu by an Iron Guard death squad (September 1939). Toward the end of the 1930s, Agârbiceanu wrote in explicit opposition to Hungarian revisionism. In 1936, he had voiced ASTRA's outrage that the Kingdom of Italy, through Benito Mussolini, had come to support Hungarian territorial demands. At Tribuna, he wrote about the progressive aspects of Romania's policy on minorities, whose cultural assets, he argued, far surpassed those made available for Romanian Transylvanians. He still promoted cultural protectionism and a degree of segregation (or "Romanianization"), arguing that Romanian journalists could only be ethnic Romanian and "passionately serve the national ideal". However, he never allowed his old friend Brînzeu to publish an article promoting natalism, since "the church ought to preserve its standing". Literary historians are divided about the degree to which Agârbiceanu embraced the regime's explicit antisemitism: Mircea A. Diaconu argues that the novelist never spoke on the "Jewish Question" in Romania during the 1930s; by contrast, Ilona Nagy highlights a 1939 speech of his, taken up in Almanahul Albina, for being "over-saturated with xenophobia [and] antisemitism".

The Munich Agreement, the Slovak–Hungarian War, and then the start of World War II alarmed Agârbiceanu, who also wrote Tribuna articles expressing distress over the fall of France. During February 1940, the newspaper's reputation was harmed when its assistant editor Liviu Hulea allowed Victor Eftimiu to publish a piece which was widely seen as anti-Christian; resuming full control of Tribuna, Agârbiceanu retracted the piece and demoted Hulea. In June 1940, Agârbiceanu made direct and controversial contributions to Carol's personality cult by signing a piece in the collective volume Zece ani de domnie. According to historian Petre Țurlea, his text was "downright hilarious", since it honored the king for having "organized the entire Nation for guarding and defending the borders"—"not two weeks later", Romania was forced by the Soviets to relinquish control over Bessarabia.

In late August, after the Second Vienna Award granted Northern Transylvania to Hungary, Agârbiceanu fled Cluj for Sibiu. The new authorities called for his expulsion, but he received the order after he had departed Cluj. On 1 September, he was in Bucharest, representing his Greek-Catholic community as a technical adviser to the Ministry for Religious Affairs and the Arts. With the downfall of Carol and his Front occurring just five days after, he withdrew from politics and journalism. He could consequently return to writing, "realizing I would never again have this much free time on my hands". However, in 1941, he supported Romania's war on the Eastern Front, including the recovery of Bessarabia and the occupation of Transnistria. In an official magazine that was itself named Transnistria, Agârbiceanu suggested that God had "even greater plans with us". He also agreed with the Romanian military dictator, Ion Antonescu, that "our fight for Bessarabia is one for all of Europe and for the treasures of her civilization." According to critic Mircea Zaciu, at this stage an attempt was made by "fascist groups" to confiscate Agârbiceanu's previous work and align it with blood and soil ideas. Possibly due to sheer geographical proximity, Agârbiceanu was also sought out and praised by members of the liberal Sibiu Literary Circle, including Ion Negoițescu and Cornel Regman.

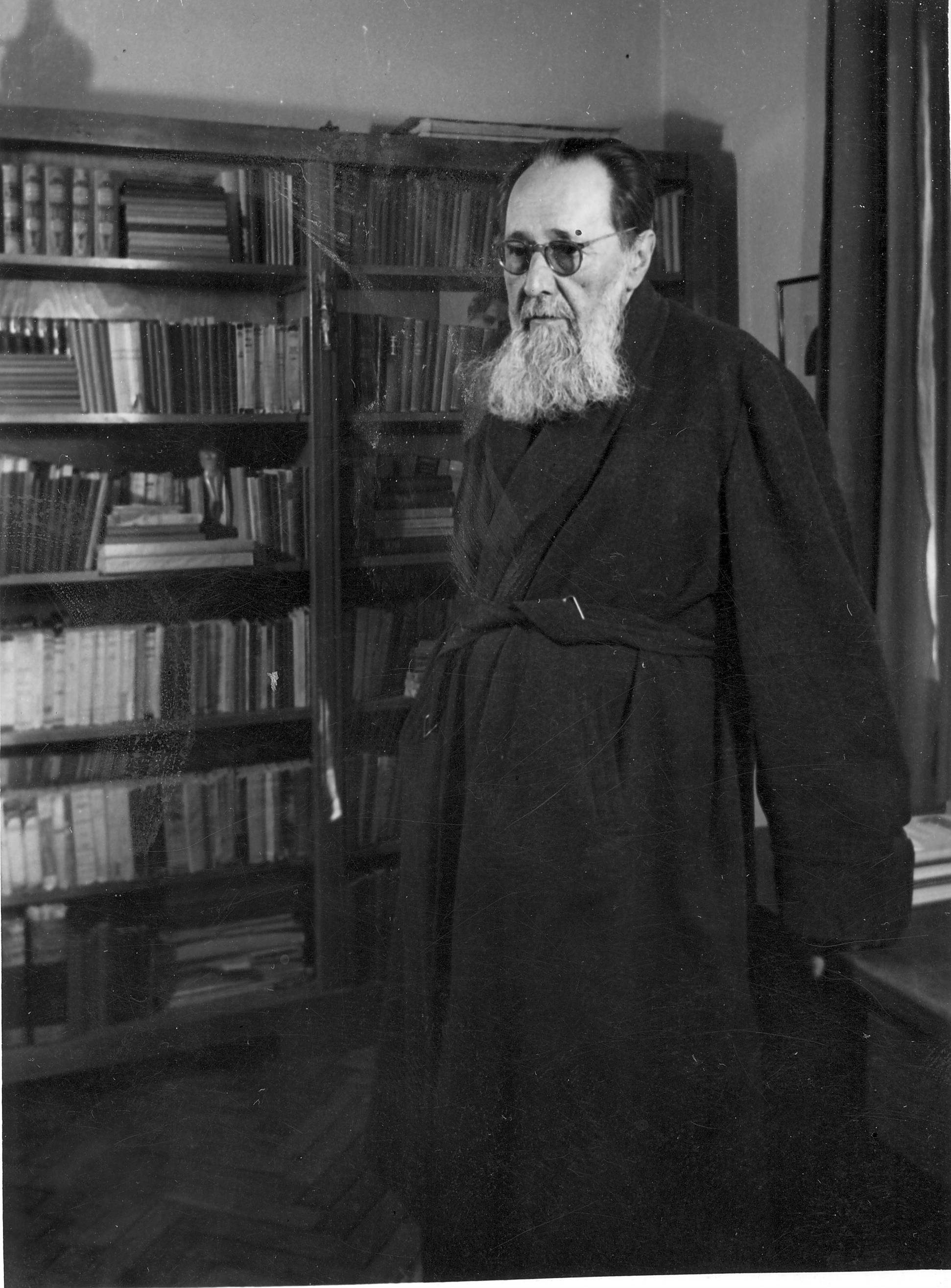
Photograph of the aging Agârbiceanu in his cassock

Agârbiceanu continued to write and publish literature throughout the Carol regime and much of World War II. In 1938, he put out the "bordeline novel-novella" Pustnicul Pafnutie și ucenicul său Ilarion ("Pafnutie the Hermit and Ilarion His Apprentice"), with illustrations by Lena Constante, and the satirical novel Sectarii ("The Schismatics"). These were followed by Licean... odinioară ("Once upon a Time... a Pupil", 1939), Amintirile ("The Recollections", 1940), Domnișoara Ana ("Miss Ana", 1942), alongside more theological and moralizing essays such as Din pildele Domnului ("The Lord's Parables", 1939) and Meditații. Fața de lumină a creștinismului ("Meditions. On the Luminous Visage of Christianity", 1941). In December 1941, Revista Fundațiilor Regale put out his fragmentary memoirs, from notes first collected in 1932.

Agârbiceanu's tract Preotul și familia preoțească. Rostul lor ethnic în satul românesc ("The Priest and the Priestly Family. Their Ethnic Role within the Romanian Village") appeared at ASTRA's eugenic department in 1943. It hinted at the restoration of Greater Romania, but cautioned that its borders could only be defended by a people of peasants, one who would have "maintained unaltered its biological potential". The novel Vâltoarea ("The Whirlpool") was serialized by Convorbiri Literare and came out as a volume in 1944; another novel, Vremuri și oameni ("Times and People"), being critical of Nazi Germany, was not given imprimatur by the Antonescu regime. Many more works, including Sfântul ("The Saint") and Strigoiul ("The Ghost"), were completed but also remained unpublished; as reported by Agârbiceanu himself, "Antonescian censorship" had him blacklisted.

Following the fall of Antonescu's regime and the campaign to recover Northern Transylvania, Agârbiceanu became a contributor to a new political weekly, Ardealul. He remained in Sibiu until 1945 and then returned to Cluj. Agârbiceanu was banned from publishing his lay work by Law No. 1021 of February 1945, which punished writers for their wartime stances. He could still access the religious press, and in 1947 contributed a tract on Familia creștină ("The Christian Family"). In summer of that year, Ion Jr was reportedly caught up and briefly arrested during the Tămădău affair, which ended with the outlawing of the PNȚ by the Bloc of Democratic Parties. One account by Nicolae Balotă of the Sibiu Literary Circle suggests that Agârbiceanu Sr was also briefly arrested, and that his manuscripts were confiscated in a raid.

=== Under communism ===
In 1948, when the new communist regime outlawed the Greek-Catholic Church and forcibly merged it into the Orthodox Church, Agârbiceanu Sr refused to join the latter denomination, thus setting himself up against the authorities. However, these found his reputation as a writer valuable for their own interests, and preferred to try and co-opt him. Agârbiceanu's home in Cluj was partly nationalized, and he was forced to share it with a communist official. Hungarian philosopher Győző Rácz, who lived on the same street, deplored the "narrow-minded, dogmatic approach to literature and politics" which left 1950s youths unfamiliar with Agârbiceanu's work. By contrast, older readers still treated the writer with a "silent respect". Struggling to support himself, Agârbiceanu relied on selling his books to a "handful of buyers". According to one account, his situation improved somewhat when an unnamed dignitary from Socialist Czechoslovakia inquired about him and asked to pay him a visit.

In 1953, after a five-year marginalization for his refusal to turn Orthodox, Agârbiceanu joined the editorial board of Anatol E. Baconsky's semi-official literary magazine, Steaua. His return was made possible by de-Stalinization measures, as well as by the personal intervention of Petru Groza, the acting Head of State and former People's Party legislator. Agârbiceanu was also received into the Writers' Union of Romania (USR), but was an inactive participant. Philologist and memoirist Ionel Oprișan reports that he and Lucian Blaga attended USR sessions together, but that neither ever spoke a word, "as if they had a running bet [to see] who could keep quiet the longest." It was at this stage that Agârbiceanu met writer-editor Ion Brad, who hosted his work in the Young Pioneers' magazine, Cravata Roși.e.. Brad was eventually sidelined for allowing the magazine to publish discreet religious references, including Agârbiceanu's "folk-style poem" that referred to bees as the "flies of God". Agârbiceanu himself was granted the Order of Labor in 1954, and promoted to titular member of the Academy the following year. On the occasion of his 80th birthday in 1962, he was also awarded the Order of the Star of the Romanian People's Republic, first class.

From 1957, Agârbiceanu could also contribute to a new edition of Tribuna, where he also resumed his contacts with Eftimiu. In 1958, it put out his animal-themed sketch Spre odihnă ("Bound for a Rest"). Agârbiceanu's old and new writings came out in several editions: Pagini alese ("Selected Works", 1956), Din munți și din câmpii ("From Mountains and Plains", 1957), Din copilărie ("Childhood Memories", 1957), File din cartea naturii ("Pages from the Book of Nature", 1959), Povestind copiilor ("Stories for Children", 1961) and Faraonii ("The Pharaohs", 1961). He was identified as one of the most important contributors to early-reader literature, alongside Sadoveanu and Tudor Arghezi, in a 1960 review by Gheorghe Achiței. Despite such honors, Agârbiceanu still fell out with its censorship apparatus. According to various accounts, he allowed the censors to operate multiple changes, as long as the substance of his writing was not itself altered; critics are led to believe that any added similarities with the prevailing school of socialist realism can be attributed to such interventions. Portions of his work were cut out during reediting, and a novel, Prăbușirea ("The Downfall"), serialized in Gazeta Literară, was so crudely handled that seven of its pages were lost forever.

Agârbiceanu also continued to write Christian tales which he did not expect would be published, as with the 1960 Cartea legendelor ("Book of Legends"). The series includes his own collected sermons (as Pe urmele Domnului—"Following the Lord") and a translation from Ottokár Prohászka, Pâinea vieții ("Bread of Life"); as well as a 500-page manuscript, Cutezări cu gândul ale ieromonahului Visarion ("Daring Thoughts of Visarion the Hieromonk"). In 1956–1958, Securitate informants noted that Greek-Catholic priest Nicolae Brînzeu intended to draw Agârbiceanu in efforts to restore their church and grant it official recognition. Agârbiceanu frequently visited the now-Orthodox Transfiguration Cathedral, greeted by parishioners who still viewed him as their priest.

In 1962, Agârbiceanu still lacked a biographical entry in the standard literary textbook for high school students—a matter which was brought up in Contemporanul review by philologist Dimitrie Păcurariu. Expecting to die soon, Agârbiceanu complained that editors were not diligent enough in the effort to revisit and republish his pre-1944 contributions. He was eventually allowed to oversee a definitive corpus of his own writings, which began printing at the state-run Editura pentru Literatură under the care of G. Pienescu and Mihai Șora. When he was led to believe that many of his works would not be allowed for publishing, he retook possession of all the manuscripts he had sent in, including some previously unpublished writings. The volumes were already available by that time.

A few days before his death, Agârbiceanu, telling fellow novelist Vasile Rebreanu that the "proper moment to leave for those other places" was imminent, had "gotten his house in order". The writer died in Cluj (though some sources suggest Bucharest) on 28 May 1963. The authorities allowed his body to be put on display at University Hall, which, according to poet Constantin Cubleșan, was packed full with men and women paying their respects; no religious service was allowed until right before the actual burial. Essayist Marian Papahagi, who recalls attending the funeral as a youth, described the body being driven in a "hearse as old as time, crumbling under the weight of shrouds that were just too black". Agârbiceanu was buried in Hajongard Cemetery in a grave topped by a white marble cross.

== Literary contribution ==
=== Ideology and style ===
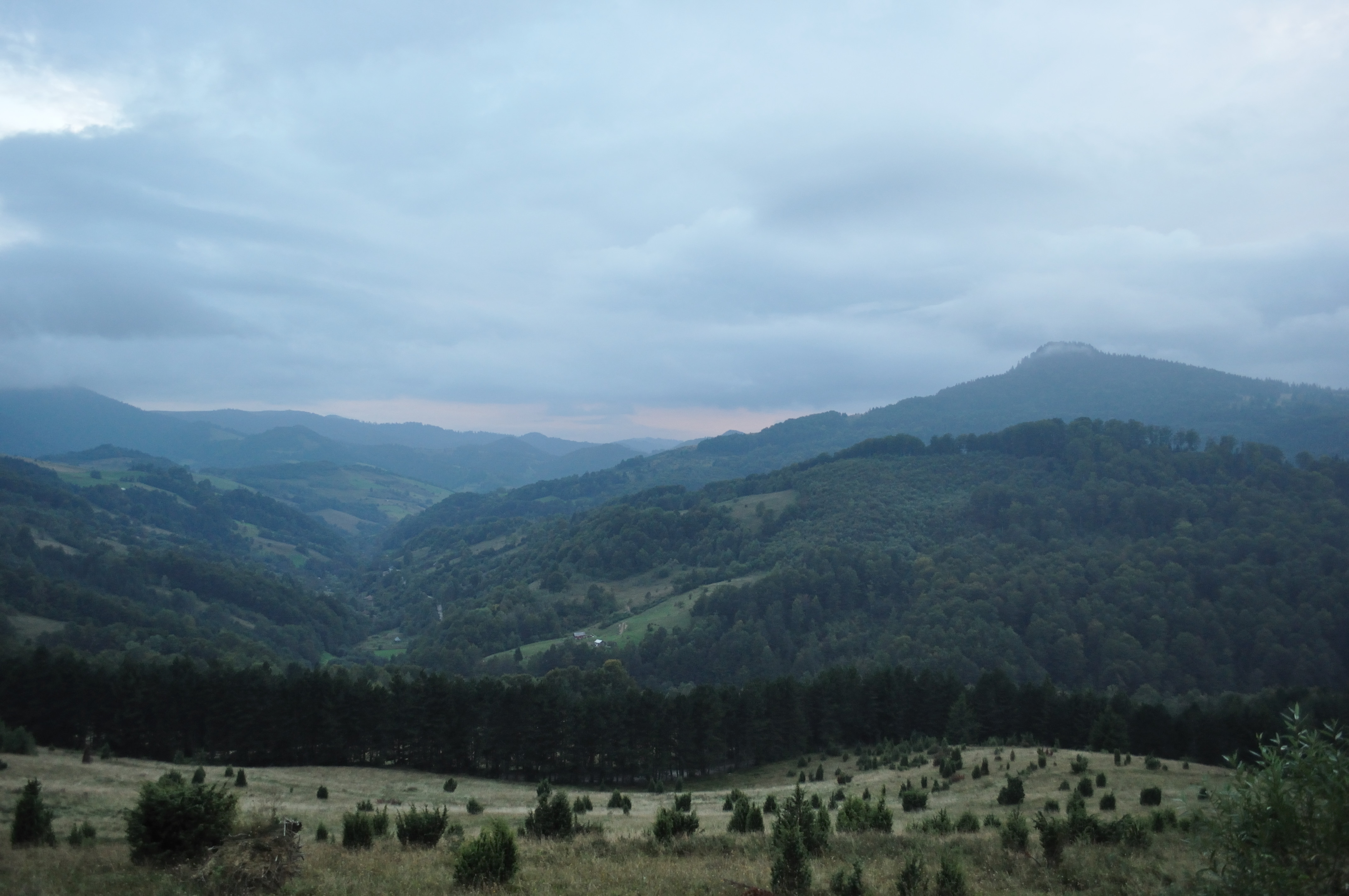
View of the Apuseni Mountains from Bucium, site of formative experiences for Agârbiceanu

Agârbiceanu entered literary life as a poet: in 1900, he composed an ode modeled on Horace, with which he celebrated the Catholic Church as a guarantee of the Romanians' Latinism. According to his Sămănătorul patron, Nicolae Iorga, he was great as the author of ballades, and is seen by historian Radu Brateș as heavily indebted to George Coșbuc and János Arany (or, in Breazu's words, as "typically Coșbucian"). When he abandoned this focus on poetry, it was probably on Goga's advice. During his Românul years (1910–1914), Agârbiceanu experimented with closet drama, which offered him the opportunity to highlight electoral debates and family crises. The bulk of his career focused on vignettes (often prose poems), short stories and novels, intended to represent daily life in the Apuseni Mountains. His favorite theme was the life of a Transylvanian country priest at the turn of the 20th century, but his "gallery" of protagonists also included shepherds, foresters, rafters, thieves, teachers, village doctors, Romani metalworkers, and the rich industrialists ("Transylvanian nabobs"). A prolific writer, possibly the most productive one in Romania before 1930, he completed some 65 volumes, by his own account, both long and short. According to Breazu, this output meant that: "Father Agârbiceanu's generation could find itself depicted in his work, down to the most insignificant details."

Ideologically, Agârbiceanu was most closely aligned with Sămănătorul's ethnic traditionalism, and was always a marginal among the Viața Românească Poporanists, who were rather more inspired by Marxism. However, this affiliation, which was troubled by conflicts between Iorga and Agârbiceanu, was challenged as early as 1912 by Alexandru Ciura, who noted that there was nothing edulcorated in Agârbiceanu's rendition of rural life. As an exponent of the Sibiu Literary Circle, Cornel Regman emphasized (and, according to critic Gabriela Gavril, grossly overstated) Agârbiceanu's links with Russian classics, seeking to downplay any Sămănătorist residue. Among later critics, Voncu proposes that, unlike the Sămănătorul school, Agârbiceanu was a professional of literary realism, who favored individual psychology over class identity, and would not condemn the city as a decomposed and decomposing environment. His stories, Voncu notes, had an "ethical, even philosophical, vision", and "the dignity of grand literature."

While she highlights the Sămănătorul connection, art historian Iulia Mesea points to Agârbiceanu's rejection of peasant idylls. She sees a visual correspondence for his literature in the art of Octavian Smigelschi, with "faces that are deeply marked by labor and by struggle against individual or collective, national, obstacles." Building on the observations of various other critics, scholars Roxana and Antonio Patraș highlight Agârbiceanu's sociological talents, his links with literary modernism and behavioralism, especially in his willingness to investigate the social and economic upheavals of the interwar. Likewise, Cristian Bădiliță rejects any reading of Agârbiceanu's works in purely Sămănătorist terms, proposing instead that Agârbiceanu was the "Greek-Catholic Tolstoy", one worth of "trans-linguistic magic". His naturalness was even highlighted by Iorga, who praised Agârbiceanu as "the liveliest storyteller" of the early 20th century: "he doesn't go looking for the folkish ingredient; he just cannot separate himself from it, because he lives therein, heart and soul."

According to Eugen Lovinescu, the modernist literary critic and cultural theorist, Agârbiceanu is the "essential exponent" of Transylvanian Sămănătorists. His literature is one that "by the people and for the people". As Lovinescu puts it, his work blends an "aggressive affirmation of nationhood" and "healthy ethics pushed to the limit of tendentiousness and didacticism" with a cultivation of dialectal speech patterns. The "Chekhovian" stories he contributed in his early twenties were very particular to that social and political context: in Marcu, he describes a Transylvanian priest's discovery of Romanian nationalism, beginning with his private worship of Avram Iancu, called "Emperor of the Romanians"—as noted by historian Ovidiu Pecican, the piece shows Agârbiceanu's subtlety, which was needed in order to confound his Hungarian censors. Another characteristic note of his pre-1911 writings was a layer of antisemitism, which Agârbiceanu later toned down, then removed almost entirely. One such sample is Plutașii ("The Rafters"), wherein peasants exert their revenge on a conniving Jewish merchant by drowning him in the Tisa. The original ending, removed from all editions after 1921, suggested that foreigners were pests that needed to be expunged from Transylvania. In the short story "Gruia", the eponymous protagonist uses violence against a Jewish tavern-keeper, whom he accuses of poisoning his Romanian clients.

While openly committed to nationalism, Agârbiceanu found himself criticized and satirized for his debt of inspiration to the Apuseni environment. In a 1922 piece in Țara Noastră review, Moise Nicoară accused Agârbiceanu as living inside the "lair" of "intellectual regionalism", unable or unwilling to speak to the country as a whole; such claims were refuted in the 1930s by Transylvanian journalists such as Teodor Murășanu and Gheorghe Popa. In this immediate context, Agârbiceanu seems to have been inspired by Ion Pop Reteganul and Ioan Slavici, the founders of Transylvanian realism. This regional tradition is underscored by critic Ilona Nagy, who finds "intersections" of style and themes between Agârbiceanu and contemporary figures in Hungarian literature—Károly Kós, János Kemény, and especially Áron Tamási; however, she notes, Agârbiceanu openly scorned Transylvanianism's claim to represent a trans-ethnic affiliation.

Traditionally, reviewers have been put off by Agârbiceanu's plot devices and epic mannerisms, and in particular by his explanatory comments and notes, which they deem superfluous and distracting. As Lovinescu notes, Agârbiceanu and other Transylvanian realists will "accumulate in details", but will remain "incapable of narrating on more than one level": "for all their dynamism, his sketches are not exciting in the dramatic sense." The moralizing aspect of Agârbiceanu's fiction makes it hard to separate between it and his purely theological productions; as reported by Oprișan, Agârbiceanu's friend Blaga was privately critical of his "just too ethical" style. Such traits were celebrated in 1942 by Catholic historian Coriolan Suciu: "With his writing, this Romanian Chateaubriand has sparked a religious revival in our literature." The ideological and stylistic implications were poorly reviewed by Lovinescu, who notes that, whenever Agârbiceanu depicts village drunks, it is as if "for an anti-saloon exhibition." Critic Mihail Dragomirescu argues that Agârbiceanu's work amounts to a set of humanitarian "directives", although, he concludes, its depiction of "the bleak and mystical recess of life" is a fine literary contribution, "rising above" his generation's.

Dragomirescu states: "Agârbiceanu is a socializing Poporanist or Sămănătorist only when he is at his weakest". According to exegetes such as Iorga, Constantin Șăineanu and Voncu, the moral lesson of Agârbiceanu's lay works is only hinted at, with much subtlety. Voncu sees in Luncușoara din Păresemi the "refinement and objectivity" of novels by Georges Bernanos. On the other hand, Voncu observes that the writer uses his artistic talents in theological works such as Despre minuni ("About Miracles") and Din pildele Domnului, ably narrating simple texts that can appeal either to their intended audience of rural believers or to a more cultivated set of readers. As Z. Ornea notes, Agârbiceanu's least known works are particularly moralizing. This category includes two stories of moral redemption, Sfântul and Pustnicul Pafnutie, which are "entirely tactless". Other critics also defend Agârbiceanu against allegations of preachiness—including Breazu, who believes that "Tolstoy the artist could never be expunged by the preacher within, [...] and neither did that happen with Father Agârbiceanu." Pecican notes that Agârbiceanu avoided blunt moralism "from the very time of his literary debut".

=== Major works ===
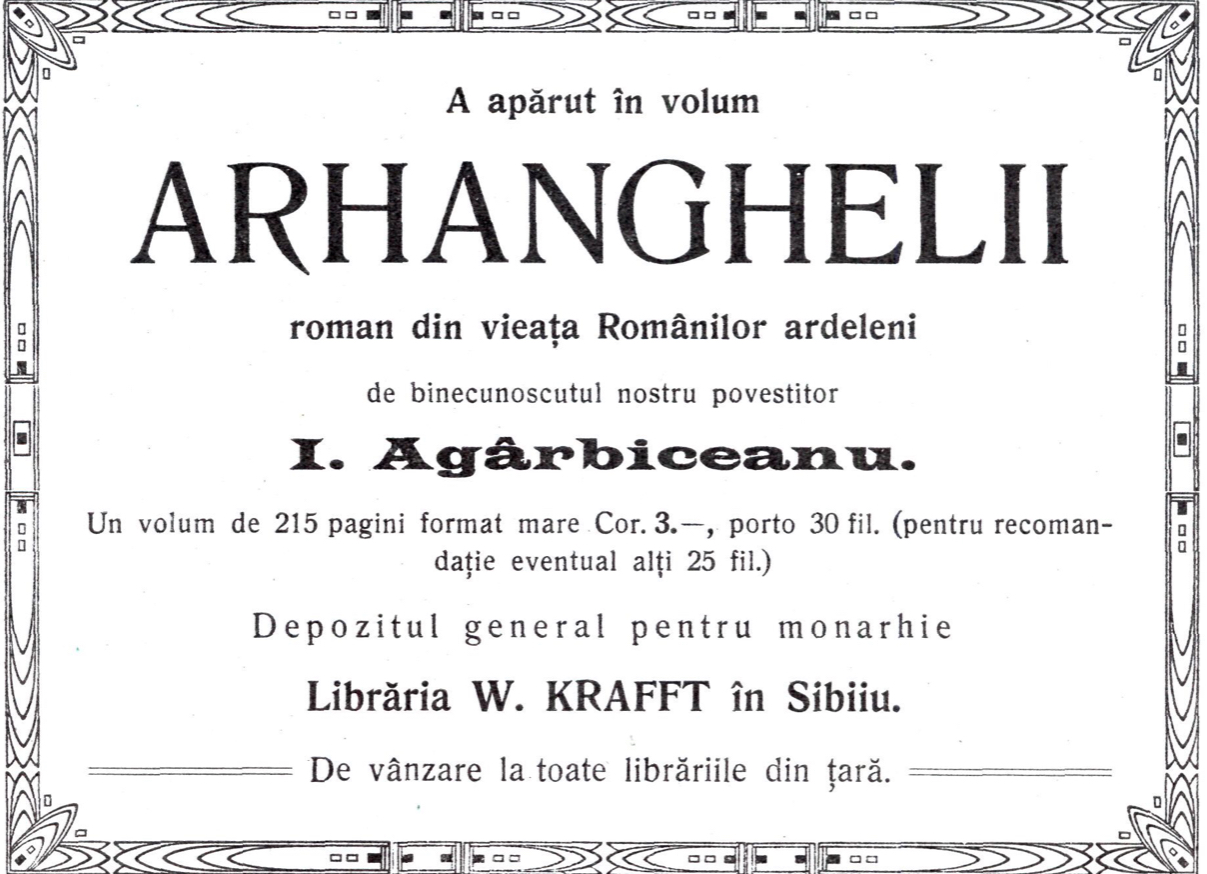
Advertisement for Arhanghelii, Luceafărul, April 1914

Arhanghelii, which has some 400 pages in the published edition, was written in one single effort over a few weeks, and published with no corrections. The work contains an implicit Christian lesson is about the love of money and its devastation of an Apuseni get-rich mining community; it is also one of Agârbiceanu's literary studies into the economic mindset as transformed by the arrival of credit, by the "alienating effects of existence outside the logic of agricultural labour." The work includes minute descriptions of Bucium topography and social history. As argued by Marxist writer-documentarist Dumitru Radu Popescu, most such records point to the indifference of rich miners toward more destitute inhabitants.

At the heart of the novel is a former notary, Iosif Rodean, whose gold claim appears to be endlessly productive and corrupting. As Șăineanu writes: "with emotion and mounting interest, we witness here the ephemeral joys and disasters that this modern-day Moloch pours over this once-peaceful village." The novel, Lovinescu argues, is overall "awkward", but still interesting as a social fresco, called a "frightening human torment" by Iorga; Șăineanu, however, deplores its "prolixity" and arcane mining terminology. As argued by Dragomirescu, the climax, where Rodean runs from the card table to see his mine collapsing, "has remarkable qualities of literary vividness and vigor." Nicolae Manolescu offers praise to the work, a "solidly realistic novel" that, although widely seen as a pastiche from Slavici, should still be taken into account for its "originality and newness". He sees Agârbiceanu as an "unlucky" novelist, whose work was eclipsed by that of Liviu Rebreanu, Mihail Sadoveanu, and Gala Galaction, which it only resembles coincidentally. Patraș and Patraș see Arhanghelii as directly modeled on Slavici's 1881 novella, Moara cu noroc, while also identifying Rodean with William Faulkner's Sutpen.

In Legea trupului, a psychological novel about a young man torn between the love for a mature woman and her daughter, Agârbiceanu turned his attention to the sins of the flesh. The erotic dilemma is one of several narrative threads: Legea trupului is also a story of inter-ethnic conflict (Romanians versus Hungarians), and a probe into the regional politics in Transylvania (a theme that also preoccupied him when writing În clasa cultă). Lovinescu sees Legea trupului as a "solid social and psychological study, for all its tendentiousness", but still harmed by Agârbiceanu's "lack of stylistic expressiveness and verbal insufficiency." The narrative structure is alluded to in Legea minții, which is about discovering one's true calling. The plot follows its protagonist, a scholarly priest by the name of Andrei Pascu (understood by readers to be Agârbiceanu's alter ego), as he finds himself in his work as a missionary of religion and cultural nationalism, despite being set back by poverty and revisited by his worldly past.

Similar themes are developed elsewhere. In Popa Man, a lapsed priest and smuggler is suddenly confronted with the consequences of his actions, and destroys himself with drink. In Stana, named after its female protagonist, a war invalid is a passive witness to his wife's moral decay. Agârbiceanu suggests that both characters have secrets to hide from the village society, with its traditional mores—the husband, Andrei, because he is no longer able to present himself as a good laborer, and Stana, because she is increasingly driven by sensual urges; this results in them making a "strange deal" with each other. When Andrei dies, his wooden leg serves as a haunting reminder of his virtues, driving Stana to despair. By contrast, other "Chekhovian" stories of the 1920s outline the fate of insignificant people crushed by existential disaster, who find a "tragically sublime" purpose—this is the case with Trăsurica verde, about a paralytic child and his suicidal father. As noted by author Ion Arieșanu, "few Romanian writers of prose have been able to capture with such laceration the inner workings of suffering and pity".

Despite enduring tensions between critics as to the mainstays of his work, the novella Fefeleaga had drawn critical consensus for being Agârbiceanu's true masterpiece—either his best story or one of two, alongside the short story Luminița. At the center of the narrative is a woman who makes a meager living quarrying stones for gold panning, with her many children killed off by a respiratory disease. She was based on a real-life Moț, Sofia Danciu or David, with only some details changed. In the defining moment of the narrative, seen by Dragomirescu as symbolic for the plight of Romanian Transylvanians, Fefeleaga sells off her emaciated draft horse and only friend, to prepare for her daughter's funeral. According to Arieșanu, the protagonist never seems aware of her tragic condition, being simply "driven forward by a stubborn, determined stoicism, never expecting anything out of life". However, as Iorga notes, this is not a pessimistic outcome: "kindness is present, but hidden, in this world, but will reveal itself in the hours of pity and those of justice". Luminița shows the final moments in a woman's life, and her inability to grant herself one last wish, and, according to Dragomirescu, is a "universal" work, worthy of a Count Tolstoy.

=== Secondary novels ===
Very early during the interwar, fellow novelist Cezar Petrescu opined that Agârbiceanu was widely read by the public, but that literary professionals simply refused to acknowledge his success; Agârbiceanu himself noticed the declining interest of critics, "a low regard that I couldn't understand." On his 50th birthday in 1932, as Breazu reports, he had only been honored with "two articles, hidden away in some newspaper and a local magazine". According to Manolescu, his stories of the period were largely outdated, with more experimental work was being put out by Hortensia Papadat-Bengescu and Camil Petrescu; Agârbiceanu "could only strike the figure of a naive moralist, reeking of a parson's mindset, in all ways incompatible with the emancipated Romanian society of the interwar." The novelist regarded modernist expression with some disdain, referring to George Bacovia and Tudor Arghezi as the "Laurel and Hardy" of Romanian poetry; on the modernist scene, Ion Vinea reciprocated this feeling, noting that Agârbiceanu's output was almost entirely "worthless".

Scholar Vistian Goia reserves some praise for Agârbiceanu's modern fairy tale, Răbojul lui Sf. Petre, in particular for its humorous touches. It shows Peter returning to Earth as a protector of Greater Romania, which he tries to defend from infestation by ruthless politicians and decadent writers; the saintly figure is especially troubled by the Romanians' inability to distinguish right from wrong, by their being "fragile in front of temptation". Sfântul develops on similar themes, tackling modern religious revivalism and, possibly, the Petrache Lupu affair. Among other such writings, Pustnicul Pafnutie borrows the found manuscript motif from Romantic literature—Cubleșan defends the result as readable, showing Agârbiceanu as both a good narrator and an "illustrious preacher". Cartea legendelor is a fragmentary retelling of the Gospel for children; it has drawn attention for immersing Biblical figures into a Romanian folk setting, as well as for its intertextual references—such as its passages from the Song of Songs, incorporated into the Presentation of Mary, or its borrowings from the Gospel of James. According to writer Olimpiu Nușfelean, Agârbiceanu's Christian messages were almost explicit in his Cravata Roși.e. stories, which inculcate individualistic values during the peak of communization.

Chronicler Vasile Netea argues that Sectarii, a work of political satire, was "read with the same gusto from one end of the country to the other", for giving expression to the Romanians' disgust with democratic politics. It was for this reason a "cruel premonition" of Carol's decision to outlaw traditional parties only months after the book came out in libraries. Ovidiu Papadima celebrated Sectarii for its intent of bridging satire and the epic narrative, to reflect the "bitter" nature interwar conflicts and move away from the easygoing political comedies of Ion Luca Caragiale. However, he noted that the novel overall was a failure, since, while "extremely amusing at times", it only retold familiar political events "without the needed artistic transfiguration". Also touched by contemporary politics, Vremuri și oameni is regarded by Bădiliță as unduly forgotten, and in reality a Romanian equivalent to War and Peace. It details the travails of a Romanian Transylvanian family during World War I, and offers a narrative format to Agârbiceanu's thoughts on nationhood and nationalism—including relapses of antisemitism, as well as Germanophobia. Vasile Scurtu, as an alter ego of the author, is troubled by prophetic dreams echoing the Book of Daniel, but outlining the stages of the war and its implications for the Romanian cause.

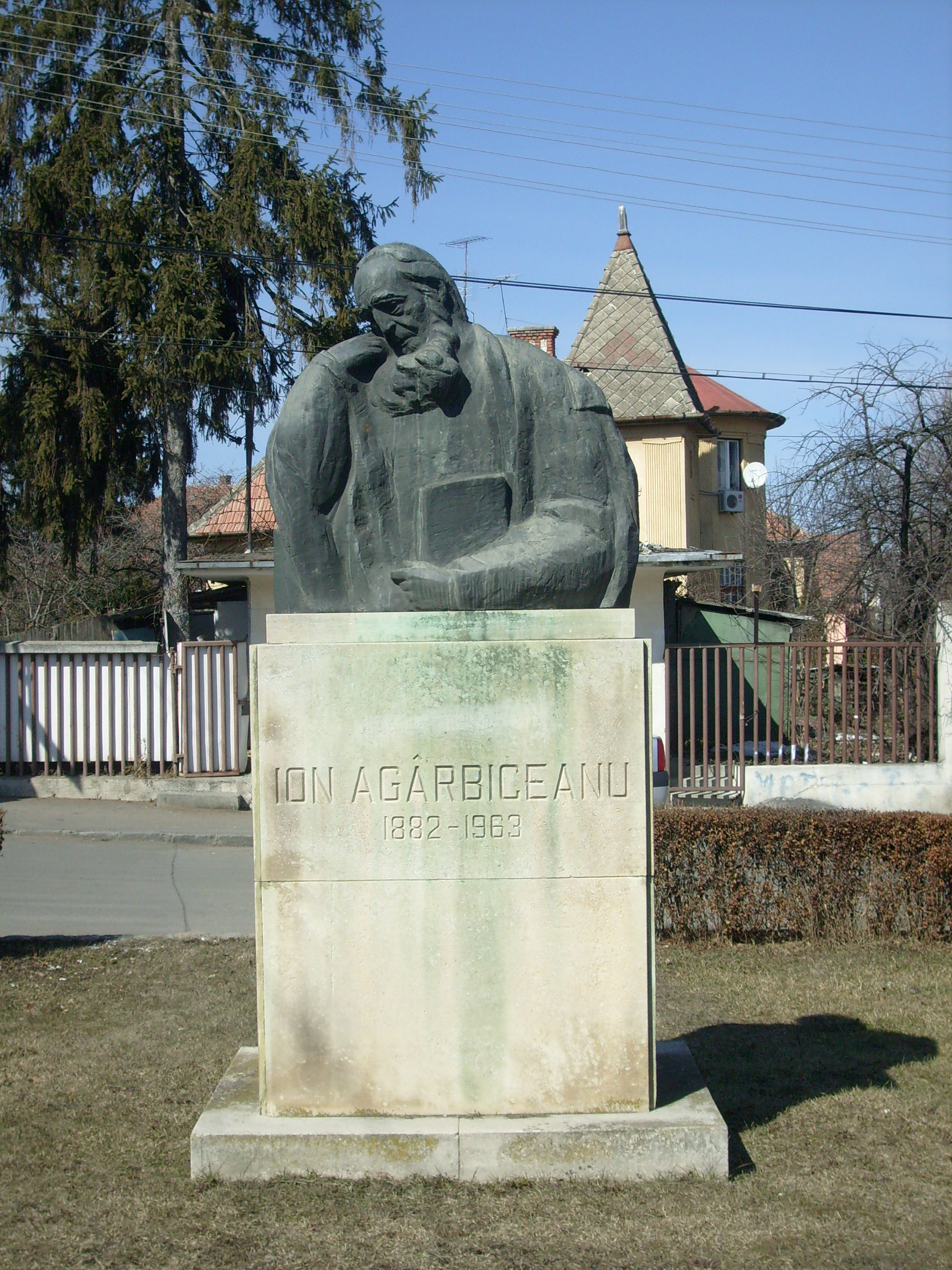
Agârbiceanu's statue in Cluj

Vremuri și oameni veers into describing the unintended consequences of interwar land reform, the spread of communist subversion as embodied by embittered war veterans, and eventually the toning down of discontent and feuds through common-sense solutions as devised by the peasants themselves. Like the economist Virgil Madgearu, Agârbiceanu places his faith ultimately in agricultural cooperatives. Other novels of the period focused on the merits of a sound upbringing, and how they can transform peasants into masters of their own fate. Licean... odinioară depicts the molding of Ionică Albu by the Catholic schools of Blaj and the flowering of Romanian nationalism in pre-1918 Transylvania. Expelled after raising the Romanian tricolor on school grounds, Albu departs for Romania and dies as a World War I hero fighting against Austria-Hungary. Domnișoara Ana shows how a young woman of "healthy" rural origins quickly learns to reject bourgeois society, finding relative happiness in the stability of marriage. As noted in 1942 by cultural journalist Mihai Spiridonică, it is at core a late-Sămănătorist novel, but "without [its] flat romanticism", and, overall, more accomplished than "Father Agârbiceanu's earlier novels." Chronicler Marieta Popescu commented on the narrative as prioritizing responsibility over feeling, but overall improbable, especially since it attempted to "shroud in the veils of love" what stood out as a marriage of convenience. Agârbiceanu himself explained Domnișoara Ana in social terms, as depicting the path forward for emancipated middle-class girls who "kept pure".

== Legacy ==
Agârbiceanu's novelistic style had few disciples—though, according to Pecican, his early stories may have provided a template for the "bitter prose" of Pavel Dan, especially the Urcan Bătrânul pieces. Other critics note that he was a prime inspiration on the more successful interwar novelist Liviu Rebreanu. According to Mircea Zaciu, this list should cover Pavel Dan and Ion Vlasiu, with Rebreanu as more of a contemporary; he also identifies Agârbiceanu's "protective shadow" in the work of communist-era novelists such as Titus Popovici and Vasile Rebreanu. Cultural journalist Ion Vinea similarly described Popovici as a "direct descendant" of Agârbiceanu.

Under communism, Agârbiceanu's lay work began to be fully recovered only in the late 1960s. An important effort in this process was undertaken by Zaciu himself, who had begun a critical re-evaluation as early as 1955, with a short monograph that took up George Călinescu's observation whereby Agârbiceanu was not a moralizer but an artistic narrator of moral situations. Zaciu went further, seeking to detach the Sămănătorist label and place him within the framework of ethical Transylvanian prose. Agârbiceanu's work as presented in literature textbooks sampled two short stories, one of which was Fefeleaga. His other work, re-edited and amplified in 1964 and 1972, revived interest in the writer by precisely cataloguing his corpus and opening new directions for its critical analysis.

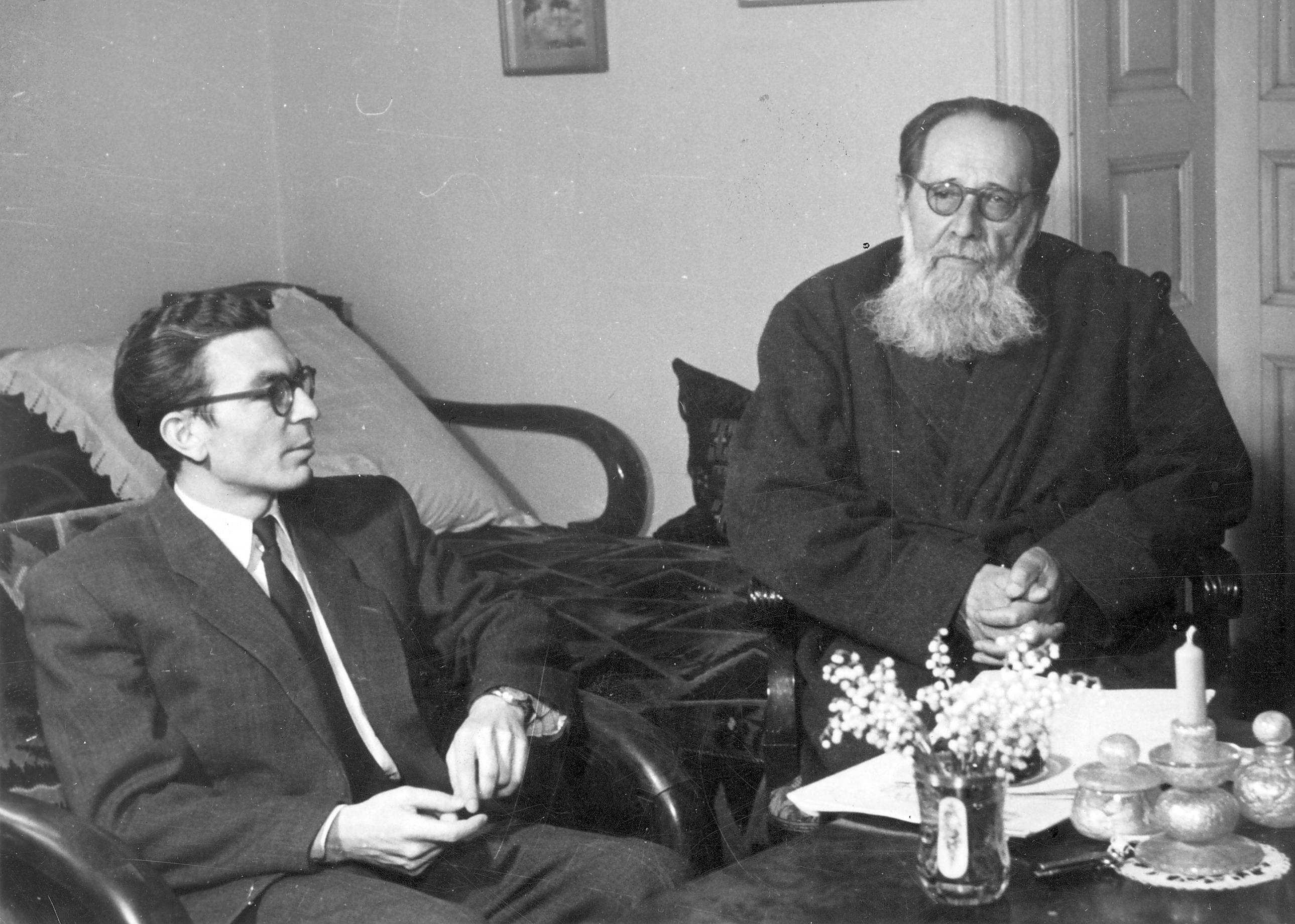
Agârbiceanu with Mircea Zaciu, 1962

The recovery was limited: according to Voncu, the arrival of national communism left critics unsure about whether to reintroduce Agârbiceanu's "uncompromising vision of rural life" into the literary canon. An interview with Agârbiceanu, taken by Dumitru Caracostea in 1932 or 1933, was republished in 1971 by Iordan Datcu, but entire portions were cut out, making it hard to understand Agârbiceanu's intended meaning. In 1968, Dumitru Stan Petruțiu and Nicolae Pîrvu completed a stage version of Stana, which was produced at Sibiu National Theater. Not long thereafter, the film-directing team of Dan Pița and Mircea Veroiu found that Agârbiceanu's short stories supplied ideal material for their interest in formal experimentation, leading to two films, each based on a pair of his stories: Nunta de piatră (1972) and Duhul aurului (1974). In September 1982, Agârbiceanu's centennial was celebrated with "unusual fastidiousness". The 1983 film Return from Hell, directed by Nicolae Mărgineanu, was very loosely based on Agârbiceanu's story Jandarmul. Five years later, Mărgineanu and Ion Brad also filmed their version of Arhanghelii, as Flames over Treasures.

Agârbiceanu's prose earned an international following even before the end of Austria-Hungary, when fellow conservative Alois Koudelka translated samples of it into Czech. During the interwar attempts for a cultural rapprochement between Romania and Hungary, Sextil Pușcariu's Cultura and Erdélyi Helikon both featured Hungarian-language translations from Agârbiceanu. Nine of his stories, including Fefeleaga, were translated into Italian by Nella Collini in 1930. The collection, edited by Claudiu Isopescu as Due amori, was presented to Mussolini. His prose became more internationally known from 1968, when Nelson Vainer and Civilização Brasileira company published a Portuguese translation of one of his stories (as O girassol); it was one of the few works from Communist Romania to be published in the right-wing Fifth Republic of Brazil, and possibly allowed there only because of Agârbiceanu's residual Catholicism.

Work on the Pienescu edition was resumed by Mariana and Victor Iova, who published two more volumes right before the anti-communist revolution of 1989. Both were still affected by censorship, with entire pages of content bracketed out. Cartea legendelor was only published in 2000, by philologist Mircea Popa; it was not until 2004 that other theological writings started being reprinted. The fall of communism also signified that the full corpus of Agârbiceanu's literature could be presented, with work on his complete writings was taken up by the Iovas. Prăbușirea and other manuscripts only saw print in and after 1997. The project ended in 2002 and, Voncu notes, Agârbiceanu returned to a "discouraging anonymity" until 2014, when Ilie Rad began work on a revised critical edition. This also included material never published in the Pienescu edition—adding as much as 75% new content. Meanwhile, his articles for the AGRU paper were collected into a 2013 volume, Adâncirea creștinismului ("Inculcating Christianity"). Fragments from Cutezări cu gândul eventually appeared in Apostrof magazine in 2018. As suggested by Manolescu in 2013, Agârbiceanu once seemed "the most promising Transylvanian writer of the dawn of a new century, after Coșbuc and before Rebreanu." However, and despite Fefeleaga being a constant feature of literature textbooks, Agârbiceanu became "two-thirds forgotten". According to Ornea, and to various others, Agârbiceanu mostly endures in cultural memory as a "second-shelf writer".

Ion I. Agârbiceanu (1907–1971), the author of pioneering work in spectroscopy and professor at the Polytechnical Institute from 1951, is famed for his invention of a gas laser in 1962. His younger brother Nicolae (1908–1991) was a sculptor, and in his youth studied composition at Schola Cantorum in Paris. He drew critical acclaim for one overture that was first performed in 1940, for which he drew heavily on the traditional music of Transylvania. He lived in France as "Nicolas Alba"; incapacitated by Pott disease from 1948, he was cared for by the Roman Catholic Diocese of Châlons until his death. Another one of the writer's sons, Tudor, was a surveyor. He and his family remained in possession of Agârbiceanu's large villa in Cluj, which was later declared a historic monument. The writer's grave was awarded the same status by Romania's Culture Ministry in 2012. Among the localities associated with Agârbiceanu's work, Bucium is home to a Fefeleaga Memorial House, a modern reconstruction which used Romanian folk houses as a blueprint; Sofia Danciu's actual home burned down in summer 2014.
