= Ion I. Agârbiceanu =

Romanian physicist (1907–1971)

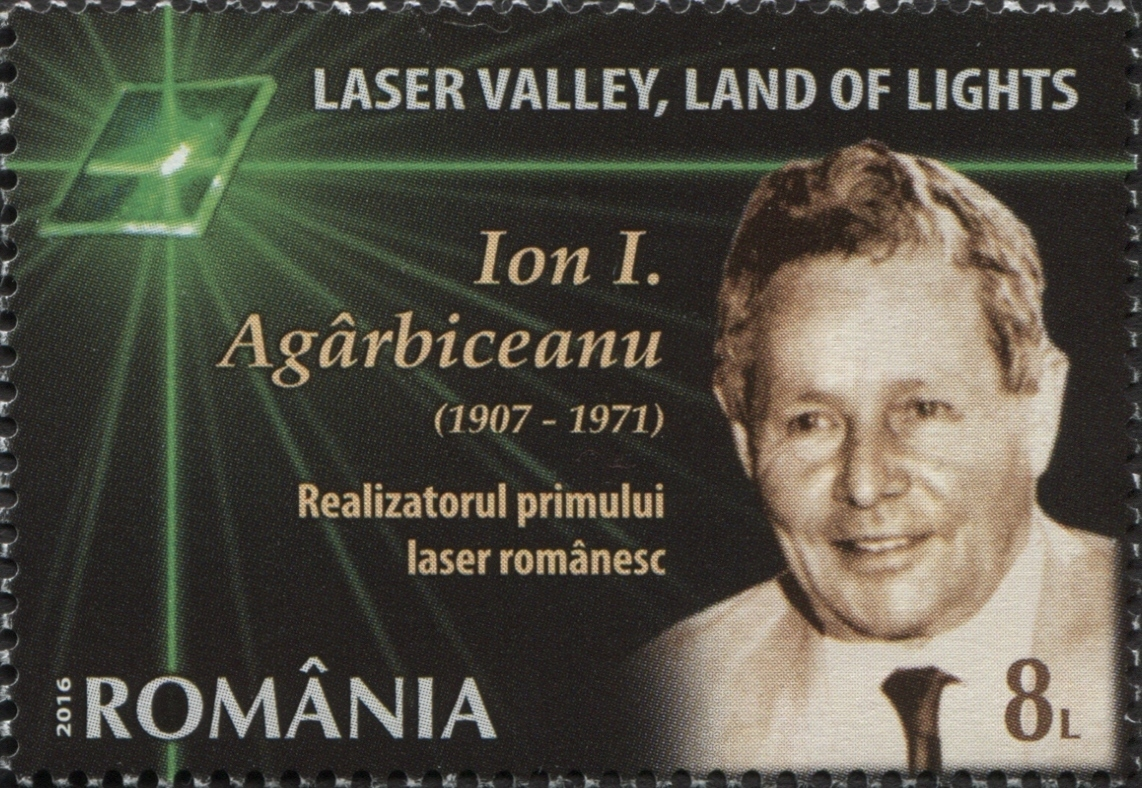
- Ion I. Agârbiceanu on a 2016 stamp of Romania
- Born: January 6, 1907; Bucium, Transylvania, Austria-Hungary
- Died: March 9, 1971 (aged 64); Cluj-Napoca, Socialist Republic of Romania
- Education: Politehnica University of Bucharest; University of Paris
- Parents: Ion Agârbiceanu (father); Maria Reli Radu (mother)
- Scientific career
- Fields: Physicist
- Workplaces: University of Bucharest; Politehnica University of Bucharest
- Thesis: Recherche sur le spectre de fluorescence et d'absorption des vapeurs de Iodine (1934)
- Doctoral advisor: Aimé Cotton

Ion I. Agârbiceanu (6 January 1907 – 9 March 1971) was a Romanian physicist born in Bucium, Alba County in Transylvania. He was the son of the writer and Greek-Catholic priest Ion Agârbiceanu and his wife Maria.

After completing his secondary education at the George Barițiu High School in Cluj, Agârbiceanu studied from 1925 to 1929 at the Electrotechnic Institute of Bucharest. He then pursued his studies at the University of Paris, where he obtained in 1934 his Ph.D. in Physics under the direction of Aimé Cotton; his thesis, Recherche sur le spectre de fluorescence et d'absorption des vapeurs de Iodine, was published in Annales de physique. From 1951 to 1955 he was a professor in the Faculty of Mathematics and Physics of the University of Bucharest, after which he transferred to the Polytechnic Institute of Bucharest.

He invented the gas laser in 1962, the first major improvement on laser technology, which was discovered by Theodore Maiman. Agârbiceanu's laser used a mixture of helium and neon to function. This laser was invented during Agârbiceanu's long tenure as head of Physics Lab 1 at the Polytechnic Institute of Bucharest, which lasted from 1955 to 1971. He was elected a corresponding member of the Romanian Academy in 1963.

Agârbiceanu died in Cluj on 9 March 1971, a scant few months after he stopped working for the Polytechnic Institute of Bucharest.
