= List of presidents of Romania by time in office =

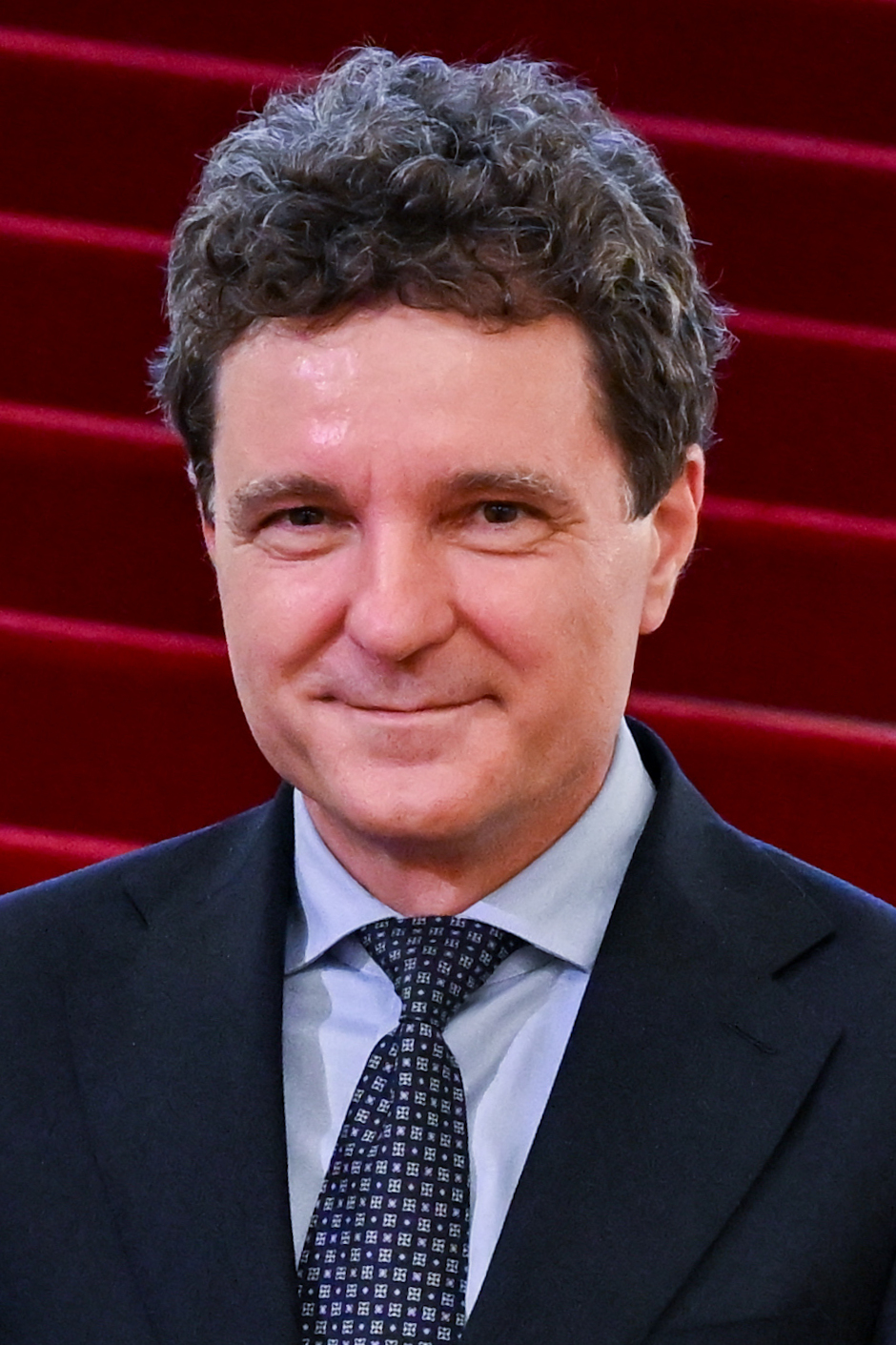
Nicușor Dan is the current President of Romania, since 26 May 2025 (photographed here in September 2025). Total time spent in office since the beginning of his term: 1 year, 148 days.

This is a list of presidents of Romania by time in office. This is based on the difference between dates; if counted by number of calendar days all the time periods would be one day greater.

The political party column in the table below denotes the political party or political alliance that sustained/supported their candidacy, as the president is legally forbidden by the Romanian constitution to be a member of any party while still in office. The first exception was Nicolae Ceaușescu, who was president under a different constitution, and who consequently was both a member of the PCR and president of Romania at the same time. Ion Iliescu also held party leader positions during his first term (1989–1992). The third exception is Nicușor Dan, who was the only president who did not officially belong to any political party at the time of his inauguration.

Both Nicolae Ceaușescu and Ion Iliescu won presidential elections three times, but Iliescu's last two terms were non-consecutive, and Ceaușescu was never popularly elected (being elected by the Great National Assembly). Emil Constantinescu was the only president to hold the office for a single term, and did not seek re-election. Traian Băsescu was the only president to date to be suspended/impeached twice (once in each of his two mandates, more specifically in 2007 and 2012). Klaus Iohannis was the only president who resigned from his post (2025).

If the president's term ends prematurely within five years, they are replaced by the President of the Senate, who serves as acting president until the inauguration of a new popularly elected candidate. Since the Romanian revolution of December 1989 this has happened three times; with Nicolae Văcăroiu (2007), Crin Antonescu (2012) and Ilie Bolojan (2025) filling the office temporarily.

Nº in office	President	Political party	Time in office	Rank
1st	Nicolae Ceaușescu	PCR	15 years, 276 days	1
2nd	Ion Iliescu	FSN/FDSN/PDSR/PSD	10 years, 343 days ^{1}	2
5th	Klaus Iohannis	PNL	10 years, 53 days ^{2}	3
4th	Traian Băsescu	D.A. (PD/PDL)	10 years, 1 day ^{3}	4
3rd	Emil Constantinescu	CDR (PNȚCD)	4 years, 33 days	5
6th	Nicușor Dan	Independent	1 year, 148 days	6
–	Ilie Bolojan (ad interim/acting)	PNL	103 days	–
–	Crin Antonescu (ad interim/acting)	PNL	48 days	–
–	Nicolae Văcăroiu (ad interim/acting)	PSD	33 days	–

Notes:

^{1} His first 176 days between 1989 and 1990 was served as acting president;
^{2} Although he was ineligible for re-election after serving two 5 year terms, the Constitutional Court, citing an emergency situation, allowed him to stay in office until the inauguration of a successor;
^{3} Suspended/impeached from office for 33 days in 2007, then for a second time in 2012 for 48 days.
