= List of presidents of Romania =

The president of Romania serves as the head of state of Romania. The office was created by the Communist leader Nicolae Ceaușescu in 1974 and has developed into its modern form after the Romanian Revolution and the adoption of the 1991 constitution. The current president is Nicușor Dan, who has been serving since 26 May 2025.

== List ==
Key regarding the political parties of affiliation

Romanian Communist Party (PCR)
National Salvation Front (FSN)
Romanian Social Democratic Party/Social Democratic Party (PDSR/PSD)
Christian Democratic National Peasants' Party (PNȚCD)
Democratic Liberal Party (PDL)
National Liberal Party (PNL)
Independent

=== Socialist Republic of Romania (1965–1989) ===
No.	Portrait	Name (Birth–death)	Elected	Term of office			Political Party	Ref.
No.	Portrait	Name (Birth–death)	Elected	Took office	Left office	Time in office	Political Party	Ref.
1		Nicolae Ceaușescu (1918–1989)	1974; 1980; 1985	28 March 1974	22 December 1989 (Note: Ousted from office.)	15 years, 249 days	Romanian Communist Party (PCR)	
1		Nicolae Ceaușescu (1918–1989)	1974; 1980; 1985	Despite his country's membership in the Warsaw Pact, Ceaușescu recognised the state of Israel, supported Romanian nationalism, and denounced the 1968 Warsaw Pact invasion of Czechoslovakia. With his 1971 July Theses speech, Ceaușescu launched a quasi-Maoist and Neo-Stalinist cultural reform. He and his wife, Elena Ceaușescu were deposed during the 1989 Romanian Revolution and were both executed three days later.				

=== Romania (1989–present) ===
No.	Portrait	Name (Birth–death)	Elected	Term of office			Political Party	Ref.
No.	Portrait	Name (Birth–death)	Elected	Took office	Left office	Time in office	Political Party	Ref.
—		Ion Iliescu (1930–2025)	1990	26 December 1989	20 June 1990	176 days	National Salvation Front (FSN)	
—		Ion Iliescu (1930–2025)	1990	A former Romanian Communist Party (PCR) high-ranking member and subsequent relative dissident, Iliescu was one of the main founders of the National Salvation Front (FSN) during the 1989 Revolution. As a member of the FSN triumvirate, Iliescu served as the acting head of state of Romania for almost six months during the beginning of its slow transition to a market economy and multi-party democracy.				
2		Ion Iliescu (1930–2025)	1990; 1992	20 June 1990	29 November 1996	6 years, 161 days	National Salvation Front (FSN) (Note: Ion Iliescu was briefly member of the Democratic Front of National Salvation (FDNS) in 1992;); Romanian Social Democratic Party (PSDR)	
2		Ion Iliescu (1930–2025)	1990; 1992	The first Romanian president to have been freely and democratically elected, Ion Iliescu was an independent social democrat in geopolitical regards. He subsequently earned a negative reputation after his handling of the Mineriad's miner interventions in Bucharest. Under his first term, the current Constitution of Romania was introduced.				
3		Emil Constantinescu (born 1939)	1996	29 November 1996	20 December 2000	4 years, 21 days	Christian Democratic National Peasants' Party (PNȚCD) (Note: Emil Constantinescu was the candidate of the Christian Democratic National Peasants' Party (PNȚCD) whose candidacy was supported as part of the larger right-leaning Romanian Democratic Convention (CDR) in both 1992 and 1996;)	
3		Emil Constantinescu (born 1939)	1996	Constantinescu was the successful candidate of the right-leaning Romanian Democratic Convention (CDR) which won the 1996 general elections, consequently paving the way for the first peaceful transfer of power in post-1989 Romania. During his term as president, Constantinescu struggled with the slow implementation of the modernization and privatization process which was bogged down by excessive bureaucracy. Nonetheless, the CDR coalition managed to secure three prime ministers who initiated liberalizing economic reforms under Constantinescu's presidency, although the overall progress was meagre.				
(2)		Ion Iliescu (1930–2025)	2000	20 December 2000	20 December 2004	4 years	Social Democratic Party (PSD)	
(2)		Ion Iliescu (1930–2025)	2000	Iliescu was elected to his third non-consecutive term in 2000. In March 2004, at the end of his last term, Romania joined the North Atlantic Treaty Organization (NATO), as part of the second largest wave of expansion in Central and Eastern Europe.				
4		Traian Băsescu (born 1951)	2004; 2009	20 December 2004	21 December 2014	10 years, 1 day (Note: Impeached twice, first time in 2007 and the second time in 2012.)	Democratic Liberal Party (PDL) (Note: Traian Băsescu was the presidential candidate of the Democratic Party (PD) whose candidacy was supported as part of the larger right-leaning Justice and Truth Alliance (DA) in 2004, alongside the National Liberal Party. In 2009, his re-election was supported only by the Democratic Liberal Party (PDL) along with a certain faction of the Christian Democratic National Peasants' Party (PNȚCD);)	
4		Traian Băsescu (born 1951)	2004; 2009	Elected with the support of the right-leaning Justice and Truth Alliance (DA), Băsescu won the presidency in 2004 on a platform targeting widespread political corruption. During his first term, Romania joined in the European Union (EU). In spite of the harsh opposition of the left-leaning parties (especially the PSD and the PRM), he publicly condemned the former communist regime. His second term was marked by a landslide victory of the opposition coalition, specifically the Social Liberal Union (USL), in both the local and the legislative elections of 2012, amidst heavy losses for the presidential party (i.e. the Democratic Liberal Party). Internationally, Băsescu aligned Romania closer to the United States, the European Union (EU), and NATO, maintaining a pro-Western foreign policy throughout both his terms. He was suspended twice, namely in 2007 and 2012. Both impeachment referendums were invalidated by the Constitutional Court on the grounds of low turnout, thus paving his way for a comeback to presidency.				
5		Klaus Iohannis (born 1959)	2014; 2019	21 December 2014	12 February 2025	10 years, 53 days	National Liberal Party (PNL)	
5		Klaus Iohannis (born 1959)	2014; 2019	Elected with the support of the right-leaning Christian Liberal Alliance (ACL), Iohannis won against former USL ally and coalition partner Victor Ponta in the run-off of the 2014 Romanian presidential elections. During the presidential campaign, his platform focused on anti-corruption, judicial independence, and fiscal relaxation. He is also the first Romanian President to have stemmed from an ethnic minority, as he is of German (more specifically Transylvanian Saxon) origin. In the wake of the 2016 legislative elections, his first presidential term was marked by the frequent change of prime ministers made by his former and current close allies, the social democrats, as well as by the most massive and widespread series of protests to have ever occurred in the history of Romania (which were directed against the political corruption supposedly endorsed by the social democratic governments). After defeating PSD candidate Viorica Dăncilă by a landslide in both presidential election rounds during late 2019, his second term has been marked by the COVID-19 pandemic and by further political instability (resulting in the 2021 Romanian political crisis) and democratic backsliding. In 2023, Iohannis faced a general strike of the Romanian teachers. His second term was also subject to multiple political errors and controversies.				
—			2024	The Constitutional Court of Romania annulled the 2024 presidential election after far-right candidate Călin Georgescu took a shock lead in the first round, over allegations of Russian covert interference and illegal campaign spending by Georgescu. The Court permitted President Iohannis to stay in office beyond the expiration of his term until the inauguration of a successor. However, Iohannis resigned on 12 February 2025 after opposition parties proposed an impeachment vote.				
6		Nicușor Dan (born 1969)	2025	26 May 2025	Incumbent	1 year, 152 days	Independent (Note: Nicușor Dan was not a member of any party, but he was elected with the support of the Justice and Respect in Europe for All Party (DREPT), People's Movement Party (PMP), Force of the Right (FD), Renewing Romania's European Project (REPER), Romania in Action Party (RîA), Green Party (PV), Health Education Nature Sustainability Party (SENS) and Hungarian Alliance of Transylvania (EMSZ), as well as the Save Romania Union (USR) which had previously endorsed Elena Lasconi.)	
6		Nicușor Dan (born 1969)	2025	In December 2024, shortly after that year's presidential election was annulled, Dan announced his intention to run in the new presidential election scheduled for 2025. The incumbent Mayor of Bucharest since 2020, he was backed by a coalition of liberal, centre-right, and pro-European parties. Dan ran on a strongly pro-Western, anti-corruption platform, contrasting sharply with the nationalist and Eurosceptic stance of the election's then front-runner, George Simion. While Simion placed first in the election's first round, Dan defeated him in the second round amidst a vast mobilization of the pro-European electorate.				

=== Acting presidents (2007; 2012; 2025) ===
No.	Portrait	Name (Birth–death)	Term of office			Political Party
No.	Portrait	Name (Birth–death)	Took office	Left office	Time in office	Political Party
—		Nicolae Văcăroiu (born 1943)	20 April 2007	23 May 2007	33 days	Social Democratic Party (PSD)
—		Nicolae Văcăroiu (born 1943)	Văcăroiu, the president of the Senate, served as interim president following Băsescu's first impeachment.			Social Democratic Party (PSD)
—		Crin Antonescu (born 1959)	10 July 2012	27 August 2012	48 days	National Liberal Party (PNL)
—		Crin Antonescu (born 1959)	Antonescu, the president of the Senate, served as interim president following Băsescu's second impeachment.			National Liberal Party (PNL)
—		Ilie Bolojan (born 1969)	12 February 2025	26 May 2025	103 days	National Liberal Party (PNL)
—		Ilie Bolojan (born 1969)	Bolojan, the president of the Senate, served as interim president from Iohannis' resignation ahead of an impeachment vote until Dan's inauguration.			National Liberal Party (PNL)

== See also ==
- Domnitor
- King of Romania
- List of heads of state of Romania
- List of presidents of Romania by time in office
