= György Frunda =

Romanian politician (born 1951)

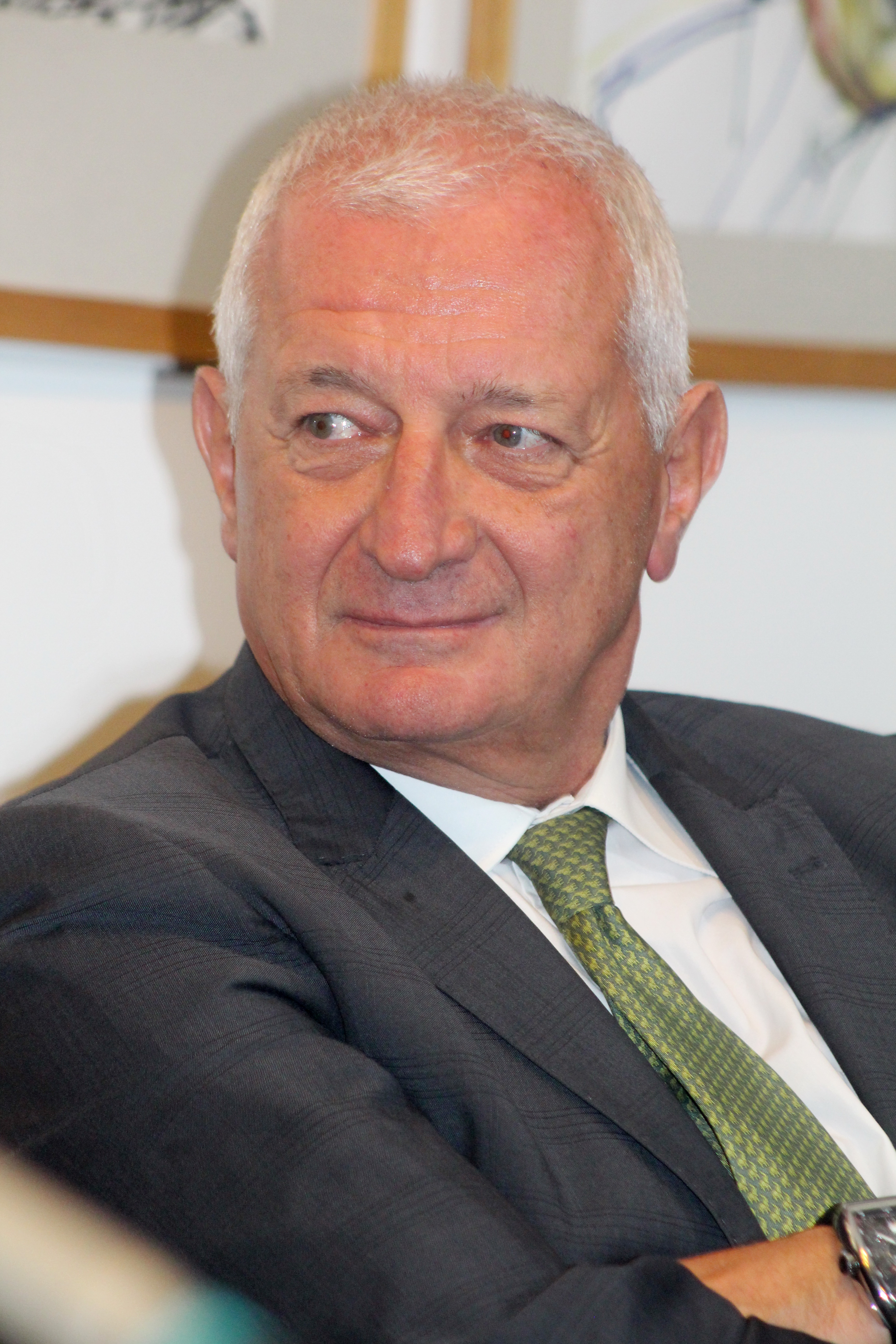
György Frunda, Foto: László Horváth

György Frunda (born July 22, 1951) is a Romanian jurist, politician, and lawyer. A member of the Democratic Alliance of Hungarians in Romania (UDMR), he has been a member of the Romanian Senate for Mureș County since 1992, and was twice the UDMR's candidate for the office of Romanian President (in 1996 and 2000). Since 1992, Frunda has been a member of the Parliamentary Assembly of the Council of Europe (PACE), serving as president of the delegation since September 2004, and sitting with the European People's Party (EPP). A member of the Constituent Assembly in 1990–1992, he served on the commission drafting the Romanian Constitution.

On December 18, 2004, György Frunda was awarded the Hungarian Republic's Grand Cross of the Order of Merit by President Ferenc Mádl. He is married to a physician, and has fathered two daughters.

== Biography ==
=== Early life and career ===
He was born to ethnic Hungarian parents in Târgu Mureș, at the time in Mureș Region, Romanian People's Republic and is a member of the Reformed Church. His father Károly (known in Romanian as Carol) was a member of the resistance movement in opposition to the Communist regime: in 1956, he joined Ioan Faliboga and other young people in organizing clandestine committees that took inspiration from the Hungarian Revolution. He was arrested in January 1958, and sentenced to 12 years in prison, but was set free by the general amnesty of 1964.

Frunda completed secondary studies at the Papiu Ilarian High School in the city in 1970, before enrolling at the University of Cluj (the present-day Babeș-Bolyai University), where he completed Law studies in 1974. In 1991–1992, he took postgraduate classes at the Salzburg Seminary and the Future of Europe classes in London. Between 1975 and 1995, Frunda worked as a barrister in his native city, operating a private law practice after 1996.

Following the 1989 Revolution, he joined the newly created UDMR and represented it in Chamber, serving as Secretary of the Committee for Drafting the Constitution and a member of the Chamber's Judicial Committee. He successfully ran on UDMR lists for the Senate in the 1992 election, serving as Vice President of its Judicial Committee and envoy to the PACE after 1993. He was appointed PACE Rapporteur for Lithuania in 1995, and became Vice President of the EEP's Parliamentary Group in 1996 (reelected in 2000 and 2004).

=== 1996–2000 ===
Running in the 1996 presidential election, which were eventually won by the Romanian Democratic Convention's Emil Constantinescu, Frunda was supported by the UDMR and received 761,411 votes (6.02% of the ballot). Commenting on the electoral debates of that year, analyst Tom Gallagher contrasted the rhetoric of incumbent President Ion Iliescu, who had become noted for his polemic views regarding the UDMR, with that of Frunda; contending that Iliescu was adopting a nationalist discourse which had been discarded by the majority of voters, Gallagher described Frunda as the UDMR's "most moderate and fluent parliamentarian, who improved the UDMR's image for many Romanian voters".

Confirmed a senator by the legislative election of the same period, he became Secretary of the Judicial Committee, also serving on the Committee for Monitoring and the Committee for Territorial Improvement and Local Authorities, as well as on the Committee for Human Rights (in 1999–2000) and, as Secretary, on the Judicial Committee for Appointments, Discipline, Immunities and Validations. Additionally, Frunda was Second Vice President of the PACE Judicial Committee.

Welcoming reconciliation with Hungary and measures leading to the Romania's European integration at a time when the UDMR joined Victor Ciorbea's Democratic Convention cabinet, Frunda argued that this process had made unlikely the resurfacing of violent incidents such as the March 1990 ethnic clashes in Târgu Mureș. In reference to the bilateral treaty signed by the two states, he stated: "from 1918 till now no leading figure in Romanian politics ever had the courage to say 'let us normalise relations with Hungary'".

During the early 1990s, György Frunda represented in court Pál Cseresznyés, an ethnic Hungarian accused of taking part in the Târgu Mureș clashes. Previously sentenced to 10 years in prison, Cseresznyés was the recipient of a pardon issued by President Constantinescu (December 1996). Speaking at the time, Frunda stressed that Romanian courts investigating the 1990 incidents had only sentenced ethnic Hungarians and Roma, and that Romanians had escaped punishment.

=== 2000–2005 ===
He was nominated the UDMR candidate for the presidential election of November 2000, after winning the nomination in an inner-party race with the more radical László Tőkés, the Union's Honorary Chairman. Frunda was endorsed by UDMR leader Béla Markó, who advised party members not to vote for a change in policy; in reaction, Tőkés stressed that his adversary winning was going to "set in stone the wrong political line for a long time" (additionally, he accused the UDMR's leadership of displaying "moral decay"). Frunda was eventually voted by 59 members of the UDMR Council (Tőkés received 34 votes).

During the electoral campaign, Frunda invited the gay rights organization Accept to take part in a meeting with youth in Bucharest, at a time when Article 200 of the Romanian Penal Code, which criminalized homosexual relations, was being brought under public scrutiny. He received 696,989 votes (6.22%) in the national suffrage. During the second round of voting, when the Social Democratic Party's Iliescu faced the Greater Romania Party's Corneliu Vadim Tudor, he urged all political forces to isolate the latter, who is generally viewed as an extremist. Stating that he was "worried by the high score Mr. Vadim Tudor achieved", he declared that: "All political parties in Romania now have an obligation to isolate him and his party". Frunda was reelected a senator during the legislative election of the same month, serving as President of the Committee for Human Rights after 2002.

In January 2001, Frunda was among the 38 parliamentarians from 18 countries who signed an appeal to have Ilie Ilașcu, an ethnic Romanian Moldovan citizen who had been tried and sentenced to death by a Transnistrian court, to be retried in a Council of Europe member state. He noted that the matter was problematic, since Ilașcu was confirmed to have "shot and killed two people" by the Moldovan Supreme Court, but pointed out that the Transnistrian authorities were holding Ilașcu in "inhumane conditions" (a situation which he defined as "inadmissible"). Beginning 2003, Frunda sparked controversy when he called for the posthumous rehabilitation of Albert Wass, a Hungarian writer convicted in Romania for participation in the Holocaust. His statement to the press argued that Wass, unlike Romania's World War II dictator Ion Antonescu (who had been tried in a similar context), was the victim of procedural mistakes.

Frunda did not run in the presidential election of 2004, and gave his backing to Markó, who was the UDMR's nominee; at a time when political parties were considering announcing candidatures for the post of Romanian Premier, Frunda was the one designated by the UDMR. During the televised debate hosted by TVR 1, in an unprecedented gesture, he summarized parts of the discussion in Hungarian.

Reelected a senator during the 2004 legislative election, he became President of the Senate Committee for Human Rights, Religions and Minorities, and, inside the Council of Europe, First Vice President of the Monitoring Committees, member of the Committee on Human Rights, member of the Subcommittee on Human Rights, and member of several other committees and subcommittees; additionally, Frunda was the council's Rapporteur for Nations, Minorities and Religion, and Rapporteur for the Judicial Committee on the "Concept of Nation".

=== Monitoring in Latvia and Russia ===
During October 2005, he visited Latvia as Monitor, with the goal of establishing "whether Latvia is successfully fulfilling the commitments it undertook upon joining the Council of Europe" (part of the post-monitoring process).

He notably met with Premier Aigars Kalvītis, and gave a positive assessment of the way in which Latvia had carried out its obligations, while pointing out that Russian Latvians still faced some problems in naturalization and voting rights. He called on the country to discard its reservations to the Framework Convention for the Protection of National Minorities (in respect to the status of Latvian language as the sole language of administration), and to abandon the loyalty principle from its law on acquiring citizenship. President Vaira Vīķe-Freiberga indicated that the official status of Latvian was not subject for negotiation, and that social integration was a priority for the leadership. Based on Frunda's memorandum to the Council of Europe, the Committee on the Honoring of Obligations and Commitments by Member States recommended an end to post-monitoring, although Frunda himself proposed to prolong post-monitoring.

In November, as Russia prepared for taking over the presidency of the European Council's Committee of Ministers, Frunda visited the country on behalf of the Monitoring Committee, and attempted to convince the Russian leadership to ratify the 6th additional protocol of the European Convention on Human Rights, restricting the application of the death penalty to times of war or national emergency (see Capital punishment in Russia). While he clarified that the council was not going to sanction Russian representatives if the measure was not enforced, he argued that the country had to decide between siding with the majority of European states and the group of states represented by North Korea, China, and the United States.

=== Report on the "Concept of Nation" ===
In early February 2006, concluding his report on the "Concept of Nation", Frunda caused controversy in his country after promoting the PACE Recommendation 1735, which, through its reference to a previous PACE document, Recommendation 43 (1998), was interpreted as a call for ethnic and regional autonomy in respect to regions such as Transylvania. In addition, Frunda was quoted as saying he did not endorse the nation-state as defined by the Romanian Constitution, and as stating "I do not represent Romania [in the Council of Europe]. I am the head of the Romanian Delegation, elected by 10 members who represented Romania at a parliamentary level". In reaction, the National Initiative Party, represented by independent Romanian parliamentarians, called for Frunda to be reprimanded by the Senate. Replying, Frunda indicated that the Recommendation was ineffectual in respect to Romania, and pointed out that all states who agreed to join the European Union implicitly accepted to delegate powers of their respective national governments, stressing that his argument about the nation-state made reference to this latter process.

In the PACE Report, he concluded: "I do not think it is important to formulate a new concept of nation. The real issue behind the debate about a possible '21st century concept of nation' is not the definition itself, but the acceptance of a new way of thinking, of rethinking the nation, and specifically the transversality of the nation across boundaries – a nation often, but not always, deeply rooted in history. Following the two world wars in the 20th century, national borders were redrawn and, as a result, parts of the kin-state now live in the territory of one of the neighbouring states, where they represent 'national minorities or communities'". According to the text, "The purpose of all these recommendations is to ensure that the concepts of 'nation' and 'national community (minority)' are interpreted flexibly and in good faith and to foster a peaceful and tolerant climate between the majority and national minorities in every Council of Europe member state".

Elaborating on the issue, he expressed his support for enlarging the concept of nation, for cultural autonomy, and for multiculturalism (he stated: "Cultural autonomy means the right of a national minority, at a cultural level, for instance in schools, theaters and radio broadcasting, to decide for itself in the matter concerning it. It has nothing to do with territorial autonomy"). He later defined the way in which he was quoted by the press as "an injustice", and declared: "I have represented and will always represent my country, with dignity and in accordance with my best knowledge. But I have said, and it is true, that I did not draft this report as a Romanian senator, I have drafted it through appointment and with a mandate from the Council of Europe's Judicial Committee [...]".

Frunda received support from UDMR president Béla Markó, who reacted to additional criticism from the Democratic Party's Emil Boc, and indicated that he shared his colleague's views on the nation-state issue ("The concept of nation-state no longer exists in Europe"). He dismissed opposition to Frunda's attitude as "lectures in loyalty", and stated that Frunda's activity at the Council of Europe "deserves praise and appreciation".

=== Securitate file ===
A controversy was sparked in summer 2006, when files kept by the Securitate (Communist Romania's secret police) on Frunda and 28 other politicians, including the UDMR's Markó and Attila Verestóy, were declassified by the Romanian Intelligence Service (SRI). The opening of archived documents uncovered that Frunda had been the subject of a "network file" (a type of document which is generally associated with Securitate informants). Upon reviewing it, Frunda concluded that it was actually evidence of the Securitate having attempted and failed to enlist him, stressing that he never agreed to be drawn into collaboration. He added that he had signed two documents, confirming, respectively, his refusal to collaborate, and his pledge to maintain secrecy over having been contacted by the secret police. According to Frunda, only the latter document was present among those handed down by the SRI, which led him to question whether the file was complete.

The matter was made more problematic by the fact that Frunda had a second file kept on him, which proved that he was also the object of Securitate surveillance. Speaking at the time, the last Securitate chief for Mureș County, Gheorghe Mărieș, claimed that he had first-hand information regarding Frunda's status as an informant, an allegation which the senator dismissed.

In September, György Frunda was interpellated by the National Anticorruption Prosecution Office over, as indicated by Frunda's statement, "several parliamentary debates, regarding a number of parliamentarians". During the same period, he asked to be heard by the CNSAS, an institution charged with investigating Securitate affiliations, and declared to the press that he rejected all notion of ever having been an informant or collaborator of the Securitate (while indicating that public figures who stated otherwise were legally liable).

The CNSAS ultimately cleared Frunda of the allegations (September 14, 2006), with six out of eight votes—the two abstaining members were Mircea Dinescu and Constantin Ticu Dumitrescu. According to Evenimentul Zilei, the deliberation was tense, with Dinescu and Dumitrescu reportedly protesting the verdict during the actual procedures. Several days later, Dinescu, who took the decision of exposing what he saw as the CNSAS' problems, clarified his position in the case involving Frunda: "It was a complicated file and I could not vote in clear conscience, not knowing certain details". The National Initiative Party's Raluca Șandru, an independent member of the Chamber, publicly appealed for the CNSAS to reconsider its decision and recall Frunda for questioning.

In early October, Frunda also proposed that the law regulating CNSAS activities be amended, in order to automatically include among Securitate collaborators those members of the Romanian Communist Party who held political offices at a central, regional, or local level, and who took part in decision-making regarding political repression. The project drew opposition from the Social Democratic senator Șerban Nicolae, who argued that the text was purposely designed to incriminate former President Ion Iliescu. Defending his bill, Frunda stressed that "it would be hypocritical to condemn Securitate cadres, but not their bosses". In addition, he proposed changes to define as Securitate collaborators those who had acted "with intent".

=== 2007 debates ===
Later in the same month, in preparation for Romania's accession to the European Union, he was nominated by the UDMR for a position in the European Commission (the National Liberal Varujan Vosganian was selected for the post, before being replaced by Leonard Orban). Speaking in February 2007, Frunda criticized members of his party for having failed to promote a challenger for Markó during elections for its presidency. Referring to the UDMR faction formed around Sándor Kónya-Hamar, Tibor Toró, and Péter Eckstein-Kovács, he argued its alleged policy of "not providing viable written-down alternatives denotes [its] political weakness".

During spring, Frunda supported his party's option to impeach President Traian Băsescu for allegedly unconstitutional conduct. Before the May referendum reconfirmed Băsescu, Frunda commented on the UDMR's choice before TVR 1 cameras, confronted with the pro-Băsescu intellectual Gabriel Liiceanu. On the occasion, Liiceanu asked Frunda to explain how the UDMR could tolerate being on the same pro-impeachment camp as the Greater Romania Party; according to Dilema Veche political commentator Cristian Ghinea, the reply was unsatisfactory. Ghinea sarcastically noted that there was an additional paradox to be noted, since the Greater Romania agenda was "anti-mafia", whereas Frunda "now seems to me the most cleaned-up front for the corrupt system."

In June–July 2007, Frunda was at the center of a controversy provoked when Dick Marty, a Swiss representative to the Council of Europe's Parliamentary Assembly, publicized his report on the existence of black sites allegedly maintained by the American Central Intelligence Agency in several Eastern European countries (Romania included). As Romanian authorities denied the charge, National Liberal senator Norica Nicolai accused Frunda of wanting to discredit Romania by providing Marty with necessary information; in response, Frunda argued that this actually had been furnished by the Romanian institutions, which, he indicated, had a duty to report them. On July 3, 2007, the Democratic Party representatives to the Parliamentary Assembly asked the Romanian Parliament to recall Frunda from his leadership of the delegation, claiming that he had been absent from the Judicial Committee during deliberations over Marty's report (they also indicated that they were not going to attend meetings at the Council of Europe until Marty would come and verify his conclusions on the spot). Chamber leader Bogdan Olteanu, a member of the National Liberal Party, criticized the decision, indicating that such resolutions could only be initiated by Parliament.

=== 2007–2008 candidatures and new Senate term ===
Frunda ran on the UDMR list for the European Parliament election of November 2007. The election was marked by László Tőkés' decision to run as an independent, which caused the UDMR to express its disappointment. Upon announcing his own candidature in September, György Frunda indicated that having two contenders from the Hungarian minority could result in the community not being at all represented in Brussels, and argued that Tőkés would have done best to withdraw from the race. Frunda eventually won the MEP seat but, on December 1, 2007, announced that he was giving it up in favor of party colleague Iuliu Winkler, explaining that he was being instead considered for the presidency of the PACE Judicial Committee. He stated: "I have decided it was more important for me and for the Hungarian community in Romania and, not least, for Romania, if I were to take up [the PACE] office." Frunda was subsequently involved in discussions about prison reform, speaking in favor of judicial methods to tackle the widespread inmate overcrowding, and supporting a more generalized use of parole.

Frunda again won a Senate seat after running in the November 2008 election, the first such suffrage to result in mixed member proportional representation at a newly established electoral college level. In Mureș County, the three main UDMR contenders for the electoral college seats were himself, Béla Markó, and László Borbély. In October, before Social Democratic leader Mircea Geoană was elected Senate Chairman, Béla Markó had announced that he favored Frunda for that office, were UDMR in a position to nominate a candidate.

Frunda's new term in the Senate was touched by controversy. Shortly after he returned to his seat, his new statement of financial interests revealed that he is by far the richest parliamentarian in Mureș. In June 2009, a Parliament administrative report showed that his office had cost the public 103,197 new lei in state-funded expenses (the costliest mandate).

In July 2010, Frunda introduced law amendments which drastically limited powers for the government-backed National Integrity Agency (ANI), an organism previously charged with verifying the assets and revenue statements of politicians; his objections were passed into law, mainly with backing from the opposition Social Democrats and the National Liberals, and with additional votes from the governing Democratic Liberal Party and UDMR. The anti-ANI legislation, unsuccessfully rejected by President Băsescu, was received with strong criticism by various journalists, political commentators and civil society opinion leaders. Revista 22 panelist Andreea Pora summarized Frunda's attempts to fight the ANI law, dating back to Monica Macovei's 2005 proposals, and described Frunda as a "devil's advocate" for those who wanted "a free passage to deals, wrongdoings and theft". She also noted that the senator was himself a reputed target for ANI investigators. Writing in 2002 for România Literară review, academic Mircea Mihăieș contrasted Frunda's "new tone and elegance" of the 1990s with his support of Social Democratic moves to keep dignitaries' fortunes under secrecy. Cristian Ghinea, who spoke of several attempts on Frunda's part to redefine the scope of ANI investigations as favoring the corrupt under the pretext of human rights concerns (and against the scope of European monitoring), ridiculed the association of interests between Frunda and the new National Liberal leader, Crin Antonescu.

Shortly after the Senate vote, Democratic Liberal Party senator Iulian Urban, who had abstained, denounced a political deal between his own group and the UDMR, through which Frunda was selected to uphold a measure coveted by PDL representatives, but unpopular with the electorate. Himself hailing from Democratic Liberal politics, President Băsescu also went on record with a claim that, in proposing the vote, Frunda had acted "against Romania's interests", compromising its standing and credibility within the European Union.

Frunda ran for mayor of Târgu Mureș at the June 2012 local election. He finished in second place with 37.3% of the vote, while incumbent Dorin Florea was re-elected with just over half of ballots cast.

=== Presidential elections ===
Election	Affiliation	First round			Second round		
Election	Affiliation	Votes	Percentage	Position	Votes	Percentage	Position
1996	UDMR	761,411	6.0%	4th			
2000	UDMR	696,989	6.2%	5th			
