= Bardesti =

Bardesti may refer to:

- Bărdești, Mureș County, Romania; a village in the commune of Sântana de Mureş
- Bârdeşti, Alba County, Romania; a village in the commune of Lupșa
