= Nicolae Văcăroiu =

Romanian politician

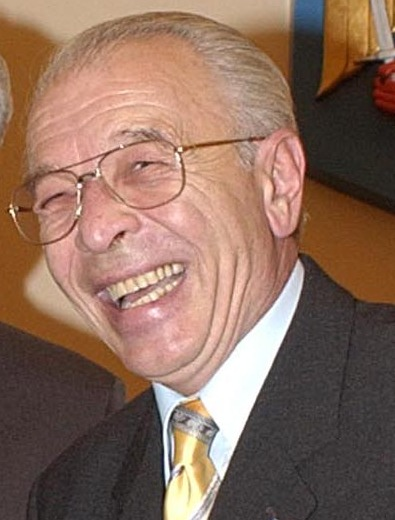
- Văcăroiu in 2004

Acting President of Romania^{[a]}
- In office 20 April 2007 – 23 May 2007
- Prime Minister: Călin Popescu-Tăriceanu
- Preceded by: Traian Băsescu
- Succeeded by: Traian Băsescu

Prime Minister of Romania
- In office 18 November 1992 – 12 December 1996
- President: Ion Iliescu; Emil Constantinescu
- Preceded by: Theodor Stolojan
- Succeeded by: Victor Ciorbea

President of the Senate of Romania
- In office 20 December 2000 – 14 October 2008
- Preceded by: Mircea Ionescu-Quintus
- Succeeded by: Doru Ioan Tărăcilă (Acting)

President of the Romanian Court of Auditors
- In office 14 October 2008 – 14 October 2017
- Preceded by: Dan Drosu Șaguna
- Succeeded by: Mihai Busuioc

Member of the Senate of Romania
- In office 22 November 1996 – 20 October 2008
- Constituency: Argeș County

Personal details
- Born: 5 December 1943 (age 82) Cetatea Albă, Kingdom of Romania (today Bilhorod-Dnistrovskyi, Ukraine)
- Party: Romanian Communist Party (1968–1989); Party of Social Democracy in Romania (1995–2001); Social Democratic Party (2001–present)
- Profession: Economist
- a. During the first impeachment trial of President Traian Băsescu in 2007.

Nicolae Văcăroiu (Romanian pronunciation: [nikoˈla.e vəkəˈroju]; born 5 December 1943) is a Romanian politician, member of the Social Democratic Party (PSD), who served as Prime Minister between 1992 and 1996. Before the 1989 Revolution, he worked at the Committee for State Planning, together with Theodor Stolojan. He was the President of the Senate of Romania for almost eight years, during two legislatures (2000–2004 and 2004–2008).

== Political activity ==
On November 20, 1992, he was appointed to the role of Prime Minister of Romania. His prime ministerial mandate began with some limited economic reforms in the areas of fiscal, budgetary, monetary, and industrial prices, which made possible the resumption of Romania's economic growth starting in 1993. Between 1993 and 1996, the GDP grew by 17.5%, after a contraction of 24.5% in 1990-1992 immediately after the fall of the communist regime. After a drop in industrial production of 49% between 1990 and 1992, there was an increase of 22% in the 1993-1996 period. However, this growth was not sustainable, with many enterprises remaining under the weak management of the state, and produced much in stock just to report rising production figures. At the same time, foreign investment was almost non-existent, as the government opposed any significant privatization in industry, although at that time many enterprises could still be sold at reasonable prices. These delays caused Romania to enter into recession at the end of Văcăroiu's tenure as well as Bulgaria. Instead, Văcăroiu opted for an inefficient privatization method: the distribution of some enterprises to the general population, with the option of subscribing to some state-owned companies, but without providing any real and relevant information on the economic situation of those enterprises. At the end of his term, the situation of most state-owned enterprises was disastrous, even in Bancorex (a foreign trade bank with a prospect of success), which made Romania close to unable to pay its debts.

Internationally, as regards the prospect of accession to the European Union, on 1 February 1993 the European Association Agreement with the European Community, which entered into force on 1 February 1995, was signed, and in June 1995 it obtained the agreement of all the forces policy on the objective of the country's accession to the European Union. Also, the first request for NATO membership was made. As far as relations with neighbors are concerned, the settlement of bilateral treaties has been delayed. As Yugoslavia was under international embargo because of its actions in Croatia and Bosnia, relations with it were frozen. Moldova and Ukraine accused Romania of irredentism, among other things because the coalition that supported Văcăroiu's cabinet included nationalist and conservative-communist forces (the Romanian National Unity Party, the Greater Romania Party, and the Socialist Party of Labour) and because it insisted that the bilateral treaties referring to the 1939 Molotov–Ribbentrop Pact, which had led to territorial losses for Romania to the Soviet Union, from which Ukraine and Moldova had inherited their borders (those tensions diminished after Văcăroiu's and Oliviu Gherman's visits to Chișinău and Kyiv in the first half of 1995). Hungary, for its part, negotiated a basic treaty, but Romania refused to accept the inclusion in this treaty of a commitment to comply with Council of Europe's Recommendation 1201 on Minorities. The Treaty with Hungary was signed in September 1996, and in May 1996 the treaty with Yugoslavia could be signed after the Dayton Agreement and the lifting of the embargo on that country.

Presidential styles of Nicolae Văcăroiu
- Reference style: Președintele (President)
- Spoken style: Președintele (President)
- Alternative style: Domnia Sa/Excelența Sa (His Excellency)

Following the suspension of President Traian Băsescu by the Parliament of Romania on 19 April 2007, Nicolae Văcăroiu became the interim president of Romania after the Constitutional Court of Romania acknowledged the vote of the Parliament, until the impeachment referendum results were announced on 23 May 2007. During his interim presidency, Văcăroiu, according to the Constitution of Romania had all the prerogatives of a president, minus three of them: he could not dissolve the Parliament, he could not address the Parliament, nor organize a public referendum.

On 14 October 2008, he was voted by the Parliament as President of the Court of Audit.

== Professional activity ==
Văcăroiu obtained a bachelor's degree in economic studies from the Bucharest Academy of Economic Studies, Faculty of Credit and Finance (1964–1969).

- In 1969, after graduation, he was employed as a trainee economist at the State Planning Committee (C.P.S.), where he underwent all hierarchical stages from the position of economist to the director of the Finance Department. Coordinated financial, monetary and price activities, conducted tracking, control and reporting, analyzed and prepared annual proposals on performance indicators for state-owned productive enterprises, and participated on the drafting of the quarterly credit plans and cashflow charts, as well as drafting of normative acts in the respective fields.
- Deputy Minister within the National Ministry of Economy (established through C.S.P.’s reorganization). In 1990, he participated in the implementation of normative acts adopted by the Provisional Council of the National Union. He was part of the team, which, under the coordination of academician Tudorel Postolache, elaborated the "Romanian Reform Strategy" to ensure the transition to democracy and the market economy.
- State Secretary within the Ministry of Finance. Văcăroiu served as Head of the Prices Department position from which he coordinated the process of elaborating the strategy of gradual liberalization of prices in the Romanian economy. He participated in drafting laws on price liberalization. Subsequently, he was appointed Head of the Tax and Tax Department, coordinating the tax reform process in order to harmonize with European Union legislation, preparing the introduction of VAT instead of the tax on the movement of goods. Also in this position started preparations for the introduction of the global tax for individuals. In 1992 he was Chairman of the Interministerial Committee of Guarantees and Foreign Trade Credits.
- Prime Minister within the Romanian Government. In November 1992, Văcăroiu was appointed Prime Minister of Romania, without being a member of any political party, at the proposal of the Party of Social Democracy of Romania (P.D.S.R.), a public office he exercised until December 1996. The main objectives of the Governance Program were: economic recovery and rebuilding the macroeconomic stability, undertaking the necessary reforms in all areas of activity in order to ensure their competitiveness and efficiency, ensuring stability and social balance, preparing for accession into European and Euro-Atlantic structures.
  A. Internally, during the period 1993–1996, as a result of the economic reforms in the field of prices, fiscal-budget, monetary and industrial, it was possible to resume Romania's economic growth as follows:
  - Romania's Gross domestic product (GDP) had increased by 17.4%, recovering by 71% of the economic decline from 1990 to 1992, when the GDP had decreased in real terms by 24.5%;
  - The industrial production has increased (since 1993) by 21.7%, recovering 40.2% of the decline registered at the end of 1992 (54%). The entire production increase was due to the increase in labor productivity by 52.8%. Industrial production has been marketed through:
    1. increase in exports from $3.4 billion in 1992 to $4.2 billion in 1993 and $6.5 billion in 1996;
    2. increasing the investment rate from 19.2% of GDP in 1992 to 23.0% of GDP in 1996;
    3. increase in the population's consumption through measures undertaken to restore purchasing power.
  - The average general government deficit in the period 1993-1996 was -2.2% of GDP compared to the one in 1992 of -4.6% of GDP;
  - In order to significantly mitigate the inflation while accelerating the reforms, a mix of measures related to financial, monetary and price policies were required, as it follows:
    - the shock liberalization of prices whilst eliminating subsidies for products and services for the population since the 1st of May 1993;
    - the scope of the products and services whose prices were under supervision decreased from 112 positions to just 24 positions;
    - the number of imported products for the household consumption (bread, pork and poultry, dairy products, etc.);
    - some public services (urban passenger transport, rail transport, postal and communications services, etc.);
    - natural and organizational monopolies (electricity and heat, natural gas);
    - some subsidized products (human medicines, minerals);
    - the shock liberalization of prices led to an increase in inflation from 195.5% in 1992 to 295.5% in 1993. Effects:
      1. reducing the general government deficit from - 4.6% of GDP in 1992 at -0.4% of GDP in 1993;
      2. the current account deficit of the balance of payments decreased from 8% of GDP in 1992 to 4.5% of GDP in 1993;
    - the inflation decreased from 295.5% in 1993 to 61.7% in 1994 and 27.8% in 1995;
    - the introduction since the 1-st of July 1993 of the value added tax which replaced the old tax on the movement of goods. An 18% quota was set except for:
      1. 9% VAT on products of strict necessity in the consumption of the population (bread, milk, meat, etc.), press and publications;
      2. VAT rate 0 (zero) with right to deduct on the heat supplied to the population;
    - reduction of the profit tax rate from 45% to 38% and in agriculture to 25%;
    - 50% reduction of the tax on the profit from exports and the one used for technological modernization;
    - the system of customs duties has been revised by aligning it with the one applied in the Member States of the European Union;
    - gradual reduction of the production subsidies;
    - the excises’ system has been modified either by increasing it or setting it up for some import products that were not strictly necessary, with favorable effects of mitigating the country's commercial and currency deficit;
    - the application of measures leading to mitigation of the quasi-fiscal deficit from an average of 16.5% of the GDP over the 1990-1992 period to an average of 6.5% of the GDP over the 1993-1996 period;
    - budget's decentralization and strengthening the competences of local authorities in the field of taxation;
    - over the entire period, more than 8 billion lei were granted from the state budget for the establishment and development of small and medium-sized enterprises (lending credits with bearing interest - 50% of the National Bank of Romania ‹NBR› reference interest rate);
    - the establishment of the Romanian Loan Guarantee Fund for Small and Medium-Sized Enterprises (with the participation of the state budget). By the end of 1996 there were 526,563 commercial companies with private capital - especially small and medium-sized ones, out of which 47,294 were trading companies with foreign participation;
  - Concurrently with the application of the prices’ shock liberalization and the abolition of subsidies in 1993; salaries, pensions and social allowances were increased by 3.1 times, covering the inflation rate of 295.5%. Basically, the purchasing power of the population has been restored. Subsequently, a periodical indexation (usually on quarterly basis) of pensions, wages and social allowances with the consumer price index was applied.
  - In 1993, the guarantee of payment of the gross minimum wage was introduced, obligatory for all economic agents, regardless of the form of ownership. In 1995 it was exempt from income tax.
  - In the field of sectoral and privatization policies, it is worth mentioning:
    - 86 Restructuring and Development Strategies were developed aiming at a 2025 horizon, out of which 55 were industry strategies;
    - For the strategic areas (national security), the concerned issues related to: oil, natural gas, electricity and heat distribution, aluminum, cement, communications, actions were undertake in the sense of creating modern, performing, state-owned capital management privatization. The decision to privatize the capital will be taken after 2025.
      1. The Petroleum Company (PETROM) was set up in the field of oil exploration, exploitation, production and distribution activities. It consisted of 10 entities (5 large combines with an oil processing capacity of about 4 billion tons of crude oil each and 5 (five) small refineries, which usually produced oils, aiming at keeping in the state portfolio three large plants (Petromin, Arpechim, Petrobrazi) and two (two) small special oil refineries. The rest of the entities will be sold through an international tender and the funds obtained will be used by Petrom to modernize the state-owned strategic entities (ENI - Italy). By the end of 2025, it was possible to act for the full privatization of the management. Following this strategy the state budget financed more than 300 million dollars for the three large plants, modernizing the primary refining part;
      2. In the area of communications the state budget invested approx.600 million dollars, installing 7,000 km of optical fiber on the territory of the country. In 1996, Romtelecom's market value was 10 billion dollars. It was sold in 1997 to the Greek state with 335 million dollars (35% shares and 16% usufruct right);
    - The export of logs and scrap (despite all the pressure from IMF) was forbidden in view of processing (within the country) these raw materials in the metallurgical, furniture and other areas;
    - Institutionally strengthening of the National Strategic Reserve of the State by reviewing stocks of raw materials and products: 2 (two) million tons of wheat (to avoid importing in unfavorable agricultural years at prices two or three times higher than the market price), 10 thousand tons of block aluminum, cement, building materials, food, medicines, tents, blankets, fuels, etc.;
    - Legislation in the field of privatization, adopted in 1991–1992, provided for the distribution of 70% of the share capital of state-owned companies to the State Property Fund (FPS) for the purpose of privatization and 30% by free transfer to citizens who reached the age of 18 years. 15.5 million certificates were distributed to citizens which, until the transfer process ended, were under the administration of the five (5) Private Ownership Funds (PPF). The ownership certificate was not nominative and the transaction was not foreseen in the law. The process of converting ownership certificates into shares has not been achieved for years. Most of the citizens considered them worthless and began selling them on the unorganized market at symbolic prices, respectively 0.5-1% of the actual value of a certificate, which in 1995 was 1 million lei. As a result, a few „business people with initiative” bought (including through external credits) approximate 4 million property certificates. In order to eliminate this speculative phenomena, the Văcăroiu Government issued a special law whereby nominative coupons for privatization were issued instead of certificates. A coupon was worth 1 million lei, out of which 25,000 lei was the old certificate of ownership. A total of 17 million privatization coupons have been issued and distributed through the Romanian Post Office. At the same time, a list of 3,000 companies was issued and published to which citizens were obliged to opt for the company to which they submitted the coupon and received the shareholder certificate instead. Under the law, citizens could also deposit coupons with the State Property Fund. The whole process took place in 1995;
      - Privatization of commercial companies from the State Property Fund practically began in 1993. During 1993-1996 2,700 companies were privatized, out of which 750 medium and large companies. Privatization revenues amounted to a total of more than $900 million;
      - At the end of 1996, the private sector participated in a percentage of 54.9% of GDP compared to 26.4% of GDP in 1992;
      - In the field of privatization, the Văcăroiu Government encountered difficulties due to the measure undertaken in 1992 to pass the State Property Fund from under the Government's subordination to that of the Parliament;
  - In the field of monetary policy, the NBR carried out an intensive reform program in 1993–1996 in close correlation with the Government's economic, financial and price policies. Main achievements:
    - since 01.04.1994 the foreign exchange market was liberalized and the exchange rate was established based on the relationship between supply and demand;
    - changing the volume and structure of the minimum reserves of commercial banks set up by the NBR in order to ensure an optimal level of liquidity in the banking system;
    - improving the financing mechanism of the budget deficit and putting into operation of the State Treasury general account mechanism;
    - introduction of new payment instruments (check, promissory note, bill of exchange);
    - establishment of the Compensation House;
    - establishment of Incident Payments Center;
    - the establishment in August 1996 within the banking system of the Deposits Guarantee Fund, which ensures the payment of the savings to the natural persons within a ceiling.
  - In the agricultural field:
    - intensification of the process to reestablish the ownership right in agriculture area, by the assignment of ownership titles;
    - recommissioning approximate half of the areas to be used for irrigation (about 765 thousand ha in 1996);
    - subsidizing part of the irrigation costs to the state budget;
    - adjusting the price for milk, bread, pork and poultry, depending on the evolution of production costs. These four products were declared to be of national interest, benefiting from the application of minimum guaranteed purchase prices by the State;
    - the introduction of incentives in the form of producer premiums, reference prices for imports, etc., to stimulate domestic agricultural producers;
    - establishment of the Farm Guarantee Fund for farmers: low-interest credit lines (50% of the NBR's reference interest rate);
    - restart of works at Siret-Danube channel, financed by the state budget;
    - completion of irrigation systems in the Covurlui area.
  - A priority of the Văcăroiu's Government, for the entire period 1993–1996, were the investments made in upgrading industry, communications, national and local road infrastructure, etc., in health and education. Sources of funding: state budget and external loans.
    - For example, the National Road Rehabilitation and Modernization Program has been developed and works over 1,000 km have been completed. The works on the Bucharest-Constanta highway were reassumed, etc. The achievements in the field of investments by sectors of activity during 1993-1996 are contained in the " White Book of the Văcăroiu’s Government", drafted and disseminated at the end of 1996.
  - On June 1, 1995 the macro-economic stability in Romania was restored. The applied reform measures have been well seen by the international bodies (IMF, World Bank) and the European Community;
    1. international rating agencies of the EU have rated in 1995 Romania with BB +, respectively at the level of Poland and Hungary;
    2. in the second half of 1995, Romania succeeded (for the first time since 1990) to access successfully the private foreign market through the NBR;
    3. the country's foreign currency reserves increased from $80 million in 1992 to $750 million at the end of 1996.
- B. Internationally, during the period 1993–1996, the Văcăroiu Government continued and intensified contacts with the European Union, the Council of Europe and NATO, as well as bilateral relations with various countries by signing basic political treaties and trade agreements:
  - February 1, 1993 – Romania signed the Free Trade Agreement with the Free Trade Association (EFTA);
  - May 1, 1993 – the EU Interim Association Agreement entered into force;
  - February–June 1995, the "National Strategy for Preparing Romania's EU Accession" was drafted and adopted;
  - June 1995 – there was a consensus of the political forces in the country for EU membership, by signing the joint declaration by their respective presidents;
  - June 22, 1995 – Romania submitted the official application for EU accession, approved by the EU Council;
  - March 12, 1995 – created management mechanism for EU accession preparations;
    1. Establishment of the Inter-ministerial Council for EU Integration;
    2. Establishment of the Department for European Integration, subordinated to the Government.
  - December 1993 – Romania was accepted as a member of the Francophone movement;
  - January 26, 1994 – Romania was the first country to sign the Framework Document for the acceptance of the Partnership for Peace;
  - March 6, 1994 – At the meeting of NATO's Political and Military Steering Committee, the Romania Individual Partnership Program for 1996-1998 was adopted;
  - April 2, 1994 – The Supreme Defense Council of the country adopted the Document on the Individual Dialogue on Accession between Romania and NATO;
  - May 1994 – Romania becomes an associate partner of the Western European Union;
  - October 4, 1994 – Romania was accepted as a full member of the Council of Europe;
  - March 1995 – Romania has actively participated in the negotiation and finalization of the Stability Pact in Europe, adopted at the Paris Conference, which aims to strengthen stability on the continent by creating a zone of good neighborhood and cooperation in Central and Eastern Europe;
  - June 1, 1996 – Romania became a full member of the Central European Initiative;
  - September 13–14, 1996 – Prime Minister Nicolae Văcăroiu attended the high-level CEFTA (High-Level Free Trade Agreement) meeting in Jasna (Slovakia). The member countries agreed to receive Romania in CEFTA at the beginning of 1997. To this end, a declaration was signed at the end of the meeting by all prime ministers of the CEFTA's member countries;
  - September 16, 1996 – Prime Minister Nicolae Văcăroiu signed the Treaty of Understanding, Cooperation and Good Neighborhood between Romania and Hungary. Prior to that, from the draft version of treaty the article providing for the granting of collective rights to the Hungarian minority (supported by Hungary on the basis of Council of Europe Recommendation 1201) was removed;
  - 5 March 1996 – Romania became the 25th member of the Council of Europe Social Development Fund;
  - In period 1993-1996 the external credits received by Romania (from the IMF, IBRD, EBRD, G-24, PHARE) were of approximate $12 billion and used in a percentage over 95% for investment.
- Vice President of the Romanian Commercial Bank. Between December 12, 1996 and October 1, 1998, Văcăroiu coordinated the modernization and development process of the bank.
- President of the Investment and Development Bank (October 1, 1998 – December 8, 2000).
- Senator from Argeș County within the Romanian Parliament (1996-2000), and in this capacity as Chairman of the Permanent Commission for Privatization in the Senate (1996-1999) and Vice-President of the Romanian Senate (1999-2000).
- President of the Senate of Romania, Senator from Argeș County (2000-2008). During these two consecutive mandates, the following points are highlighted:
  A. Internally:
  - The increase of the quality and efficiency of the legislative activity as a result of the proposed measures adopted by the Permanent Bureau and approved by the Plenum of the Chamber through the Decision for amending and supplementing the Regulation on organization and functioning;
  - Keeping track of compliance with the procedures set out in the Regulation;
  - Regular meeting with the leaders of the parliamentary groups in order to ensure consensus on important drafted laws;
  - Ensuring good collaboration with the President of Romania, the Chamber of Deputies, the Government, the Constitutional Court and the other state institutions and authorities;
  - Organizing the anniversary of the 140th anniversary of the Senate's establishment (1864-2004), attended by representatives of the main institutions and state authorities, as well as delegates from the Senates of Europe. A homage volume „History of the Romanian Senate in the period 1864-2004” and a jubilee medal were issued. B. External:
  - The parliamentary activities of the Senate – during the 2001-2008 period – have experienced a continuous ascendant evolution and a diversification from the point of view of the content and modalities of the interparliamentary cooperation:
  - Strengthening the parliamentary political dialogue between Romania and the European Union;
  - Developing bilateral relations with the Senates from the European Union and from all over Europe. Being an active participant in the Association of Senates in Europe, established in 2001 (annual rotating meetings in the member states – in Romania, the Association's meeting took place in 2007);
  - Active participation in EU interparliamentary cooperation forums and structures;
  - Parliamentary support, through the participation in the NATO Parliamentary Assembly and bilateral relations with the member countries, of the process of Romania's integration into NATO;
  - Promoting the parliamentary dimension of international cooperation under UN auspices;
  - Developing parliamentary processes associated with regional and sub-regional organizations;
  - In June 2003, the President of the Senate took over the Presidency of the Parliamentary Assembly of the Black Sea Economic Cooperation. The main actions:
    - participation in the Black Sea Energy Summit, held in Bucharest;
    - meetings with Ambassadors of BSEC's member countries, accredited in Romania;
    - participating in the working visit to the International PABSEC Secretariat in Istanbul, where he attended the Reunion of the Committee of Senior Officials and met with members of the BSEC's Business Council.
  - Between 2001 and 2008, the President of the Senate had numerous international meetings, as it follows:
    1. 70 meetings with Heads of State from Europe, America, Asia and Africa;
    2. 192 meetings with Presidents and Vice-Presidents of the Foreign Parliaments;
    3. 40 meetings with Prime Ministers from the same areas;
    4. 26 meetings with Leaders of International Organizations.
  - The President of the Senate, Nicolae Văcăroiu, carried out official visits in 40 states during 2001–2008. The objectives pursued were the following:
    - development of bilateral parliamentary relations;
    - focus on economic component, mainly:
      1. development of commercial relations;
      2. expanding the selling markets for the Romanian products;
      3. attracting foreign investments in the Romanian economy;
      4. the official visit program included meetings with Prime Ministers, Foreign Ministers, Ministers of Economy, Finance, Justice, Chambers of Commerce and Industry, etc.

The countries where official visits were made include Japan, China, South Korea, India, Turkey, Philippines, Mexico, Chile, Peru, Colombia, and Lebanon. In most of the visits, the official delegation was accompanied by businessmen (between 80 and 120 people), representatives of the Chamber of Commerce and Industry, the Association of Employers, and the media. The meetings between the Romanian and the Romanian businessmen were organized with the participation of the President of the Senate.

- Interim President of Romania (April 20-May 23, 2007) while the elected head of state was suspended by the Parliament of Romania.
- President of the Court of Accounts of Romania (October 15, 2008 to October 15, 2017)
  - The activity of the Romanian Court of Accounts in the nine years of the Văcăroiu's mandate is presented in the "White Paper", published on the Court of Accounts' website.
  - The 150th Anniversary of the Establishment of the Romanian Court of Accounts (1864-2014), attended by more than 1,200 people:
    - Delegations led by the heads of the Romanian institutions and authorities: the President of Romania, the President of the Chamber of Deputies, the Deputy Speaker of the Senate, the Prime Minister and members of the Government, the President of the Constitutional Court, the President of the High Court of Cassation and Justice, the Prosecutor General, National Bank of Romania, Association of Banks, President of the Romanian Academy, Academy of Scientists, Patriarch of Romania, Presidents of Political Parties, etc.
    - External delegations from 30 countries, led by the Chairmen and Deputy Chairmen of the Supreme Audit Institutions: President of the Court of Auditors, President of INTOSAI and EUROSAI, and those of several countries: Austria, Belgium, Czech Republic, Greece, Hungary, Lithuania, Luxembourg, Poland, Portugal, Slovakia, Spain, Slovenia, Albania, Algeria, Argentina, Azerbaijan, Bosnia and Herzegovina, Brazil, Croatia, Finland, Kazakhstan, Malta, Republica Moldova, Montenegro, Nigeria, Russia, and South Africa. The General Controller of the United States National Audit Office has submitted a video message that was presented to the participants. The jubilee volume "History of the Court of Accounts of Romania in the period 1864-2014" and jubilee medals, distributed to the guests, were issued and published.
    - Romania mass-media.

== Teaching, research and publication activity ==
Between 1975 and 1984 Văcăroiu was an associate professor at the Bucharest Academy of Economic Studies and at the University of Bucharest, in the Faculty of Economic Sociology. He was also a first degree research associate within the Central Institute for Economic Research of the Romanian Academy. He attended conferences, meetings and scientific seminars organized domestically and internationally, and published numerous articles in newspapers and magazines in economic, financial, price and monetary matters. Together with journalist Gheorghe Smeureanu, he co-authored the book "Romania, Games of Interest", published by Intact Publishing House, Bucharest, 1998.

== Awards and degrees ==
A. Internally:

- Order of the Star of Romania, Officer rank, conferred by the President of Romania by Decree no 421/26.05.2014 on the occasion of the 150th Anniversary of the Court of Accounts’ Establishment - for excellence demonstrated at the national level in coordinating the act of control, contributing to the efficient use of the state's financial resources.
- Order of the Star of Romania, Knight rank (2002).
- Degree "University Merit with Virgil Madgearu Gold Medal" awarded by the Senate of the Bucharest Academy of Economic Studies for excellence in all professional and scientific activity and outstanding performances in the evolution of Romanian society (2017).
- Obtaining the quality of Associate Researcher, 1-st degree, with all rights and duties under the Statute of the Institute and its Rules of organization and functioning of the Scientific Council of the National Institute of Economic Research, granted under Romanian Academy Presidium Decision no 91/20.02.2004.
- Doctor Honoris Causa of Andrei Șaguna University in Constanța (2007).
- Degree of Excellence awarded by the Academy of Economic Studies in Bucharest, for the prodigious professional-scientific activity and the contribution to the affirmation of the Higher Schooling in Economics;
- Degree of "Honorary Member of the Senate of the University of Pitești" (2000).
- The "Jubilee Medal", awarded by the West University Vasile Goldiș from Arad, (2005).
- The degree of "Honorary Member of the National Union of Notaries Public" (2001).
- Jubilee degree awarded by the National Association of Exporters and Importers in Romania (2015).
- Degree of Excellence awarded by the Romanian Investors' Association (2002).
- Patent of the General Union of Industrialists in Romania - UGIR 1903, for remarkable contribution to the reconstruction of the Romanian economy (2003).
- Degree of Excellency awarded by the Rural Credit Guarantee Fund.
- Honorary degree Dimitrie C. Butculescu, awarded by the ARTIFEX-UCECOM Foundation (2004).
- The patent conferring the decoration "Badge of Honour" of the Romanian Army.
- Degree of Excellency awarded by the National Veterans Association (2002).
- Honorary Member of the National Union of Military Staff in Reserve and Withdrawn (Decision 108/27.10.1994), awarded for the support given to the objectives and tasks set out in the Union Program (1994);
- Honorary Title "Charitable Man of the Year 1998", awarded by the Archdiocese of Argeș and Muscel for work in the service of the Christian community;
- More than 120 degrees of excellence or honor awarded by public institutions, associations, foundations, universities, public administration councils, etc;
- 25 degrees conferring the status of "Citizen of Honor" awarded by County Councils (Argeș, Hunedoara) and towns and cities (Pitești, Craiova, Mioveni, Câmpulung, etc.).

B. Externally:

- National Order of Merit, Grand Cross, awarded by the President of Paraguay.
- The Renaissance Order, First Order awarded by the King of Jordan.
- Columbus Congress Order Grade Grand Extraordinary Cross Gold Plated.
- Gold Medal Pericles, conferred by the President of Hellenic Parliament.
- The Gold Medal of the French Senate, conferred by its president;
- Grand Decoration, awarded by the Senate of Chile.
- Degree and Medal awarded by the President of the Senate of the Czech Republic.
- Order of cultural merit, Knight rank awarded by the Brazilian Academy of Arts, Culture, and History.
- The Plaque of Honor, conferred by the President of the National Assembly of the Republic of Bulgaria, for assistance and support in the process of European Integration.
- Degree of Honor and Merit with Gold Medal, awarded by the Universidad Nacional de Asunción, Paraguay.

== Notes ==
Political offices
Preceded by Theodor Stolojan	Prime Minister of Romania; 1992–1996	Succeeded by Victor Ciorbea
Preceded by Mircea Ionescu-Quintus	President of the Senate; 2000–2008	Succeeded by Doru Ioan Tărăcilă; Acting
Preceded by Traian Băsescu	President of Romania; Acting; 2007	Succeeded by Traian Băsescu
Legal offices
Preceded by Dan Drosu Șaguna	President of the Court of Accounts; 2008–2017	Succeeded by Mihai Busuioc
