= Alexandru Papiu Ilarian National College =

High school at 12 Bernády György Square, Târgu Mureș, Romania

Coordinates: 46°32′45″N 24°34′06″E

Alexandru Papiu Ilarian National College

Alexandru Papiu Ilarian National College (Romanian: Colegiul Național „Alexandru Papiu Ilarian”) is a high school located at 12 Bernády György Square, Târgu Mureș, Romania.

== History ==
The school building dates to the period when the city was part of Austria-Hungary. The work of a Budapest firm, it is U-shaped and features 112 rooms. It is 60 meters long and 45.5 meters wide, and cost nearly a million crowns. Work began in September 1912. It was ready a year later for a Roman Catholic girls’ high school to move in. During World War I, most of the school was used as a military hospital, with classes held on part of the upper story.

The present institution opened in October 1919, following the union of Transylvania with Romania. The building was taken over by the Romanian state, and it became a boys’ school, the language of instruction Romanian. There were originally 12 teachers and 238 pupils. By 1934–1935, the school had 589 pupils, with a corresponding rise in the number of faculty. It was closed between 1940 and 1944, when Hungary controlled the area as a result of the Second Vienna Award. The school library and archive were temporarily moved to Aiud.

Reopened in late 1944, it functioned as a boys’ school until 1948. At that point, the new communist regime compelled the admission of girls; instruction was in Romanian and Hungarian. Inspired by the Soviet educational system, the early communist authorities imposed drastic changes on the school, for example eliminating Latin, logic, sociology and religion as subjects. The school was declared a national college in 1999.

In front of the main entrance, there is a bust of Alexandru Papiu Ilarian, for whom the school is named. The work of Ion Schmidt-Faur, it was inaugurated with great pomp in 1930. It spent World War II in a corner of the Aiud high school yard, and was not unveiled again in its original location until 1957. The building as well as the bust are listed as historic monuments by Romania's Ministry of Culture and Religious Affairs.

== Faculty and Alumni ==
=== Faculty ===
- Endre Antalffy
- Ion Chinezu (1920–1925)

=== Alumni ===
- László Bölöni (1972)
- György Frunda (1970)
- Ovidiu Papadima (1928)
