= Voiniceni =

Voiniceni Szabadi-patak
- Location within Romania

Location
- Country: Romania
- Counties: Mureș County
- Villages: Voiniceni, Sântana de Mureș

Physical characteristics
- Mouth: Mureș
  - location: Sântana de Mureș
  - coordinates: 46.5739°N 24.5699°E
- Length: 15 km (9.3 mi)
- Basin size: 62 km^{2} (24 sq mi)

Basin features
- Progression: Mureș→ Tisza→ Danube→ Black Sea

The Voiniceni (Hungarian: Szabadi-patak) is a right tributary of the river Mureș in Transylvania, Romania. It discharges into the Mureș near Târgu Mureș. Its length is 15 km (9.3 mi) and its basin size is 62 km^{2} (24 sq mi).
