= 2012 Romanian presidential impeachment referendum =

- 29 July 2012
- Do you agree with the dismissal of the President of Romania, Mr. Traian Băsescu?

Results
Choice	Votes	%
Yes	7,403,836	88.70%
No	943,375	11.30%
Valid votes	8,347,211	98.68%
Invalid or blank votes	111,842	1.32%
Total votes	8,459,053	100.00%
Registered voters/turnout	18,292,464	46.24%
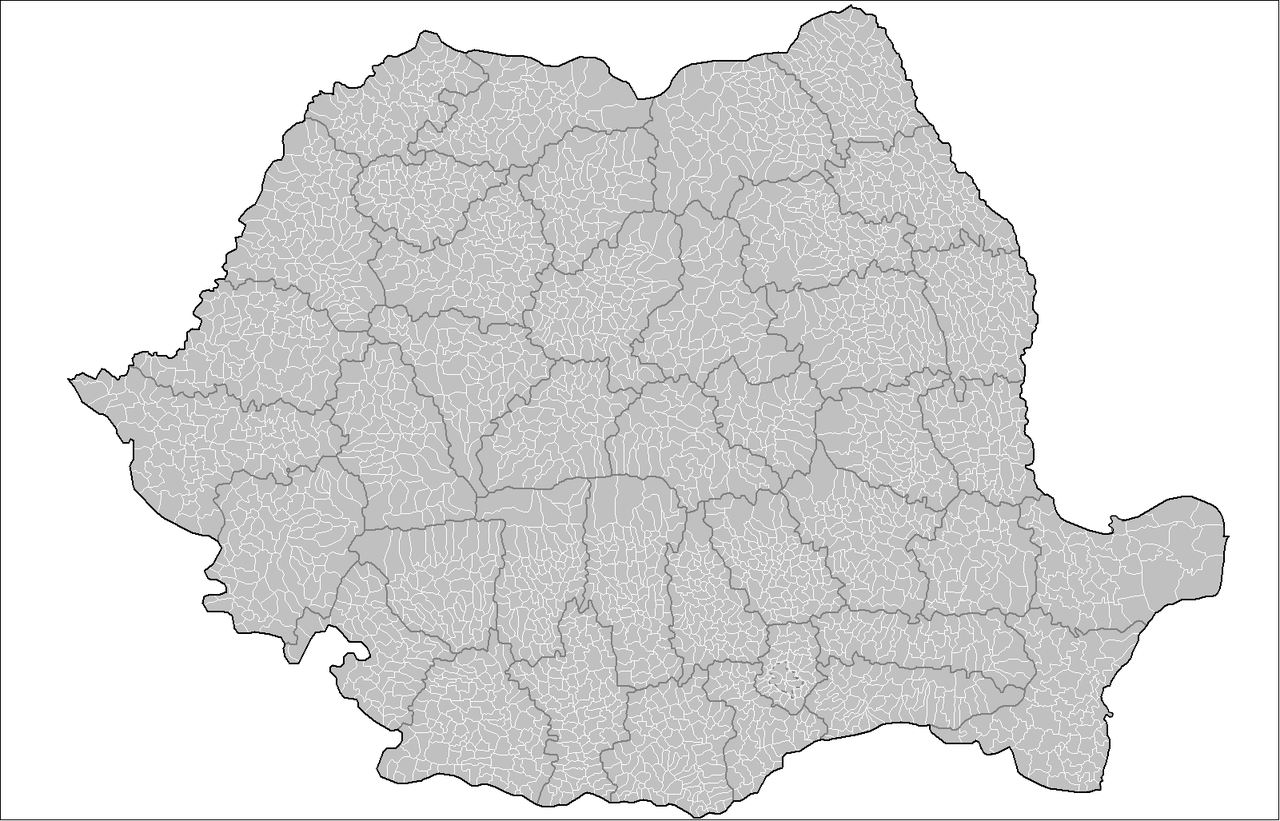
- Results by county

A referendum on impeaching President Traian Băsescu was held in Romania on 29 July 2012. The referendum was required after Parliament voted in favour of impeaching Băsescu on 6 July, and had to take place within a month. It was the second referendum on impeaching Băsescu, the first having been held in May 2007, in which 74% of voters chose to keep him in office. Băsescu was later narrowly re-elected in 2009.

The parliament of Romania impeached the former president and called on the nation to dismiss Băsescu on a variety of charges, but Băsescu dismissed the poll as a "putsch" and asked the public to boycott it. Polls showed a majority of Romanians favoring the impeachment of the President, but the turnout was estimated to be around 46%, thus rendering the referendum invalid. The Constitutional court has the final verdict in the case of the validity of the referendum. Final results from the Central Electoral Bureau were published on 1 August 2012. On 2 August 2012, the Court announced that a verdict for the validity of the referendum will be pronounced after 12 September 2012. Until that date, all the authorities have to clear up the electoral lists, in order to correctly calculate the voter turnout. Finally, the verdict will be presented in a joint session of Parliament. Meanwhile, the Constitutional Court rescheduled the verdict for 31 August 2012. A second rescheduling placed the verdict on 21 August 2012. The Constitutional Court of Romania subsequently declared the referendum invalid, reinstating Băsescu as president of Romania, which succeeded on 28 August.

== Background ==
Băsescu's political rival, Prime Minister Victor Ponta, accused him of overstepping his powers through illegal phone-tapping, use of national intelligence services against political enemies, and pressuring prosecutors in criminal cases. The president's popularity had fallen due to his support for strong austerity measures and perceptions that his appointments were guided by cronyism. Băsescu responded by calling the referendum a putsch attempt by his opponent, who had previously been criticized for dismissing the speakers in both chambers of the Romanian Parliament and the country's ombudsman. He asked the public to boycott the poll.

On the day before the vote in Parliament, the government changed the referendum law to enable an impeachment referendum to be valid if a majority of voters voted in favour. Previously the law required at least 50% of eligible voters to vote in favour. Following criticism of his tactics from the European Union, which accused him of "undermining the rule of law", Ponta accepted the ruling by the Constitutional Court to require a turnout of 50% plus one to render the result of the referendum valid.

== Opinion polling ==
Voting intention
Pollster	Publication date	Sample size	For impeachment	Against impeachment	Projected turnout	Source
CURS	18 July	1,104	66%	34%	61%	
BSG / SCI	25 July	1,104	61%	30%	N/A	
Operations Research	27 July	1,420	76%	24%	52%	

== Results ==
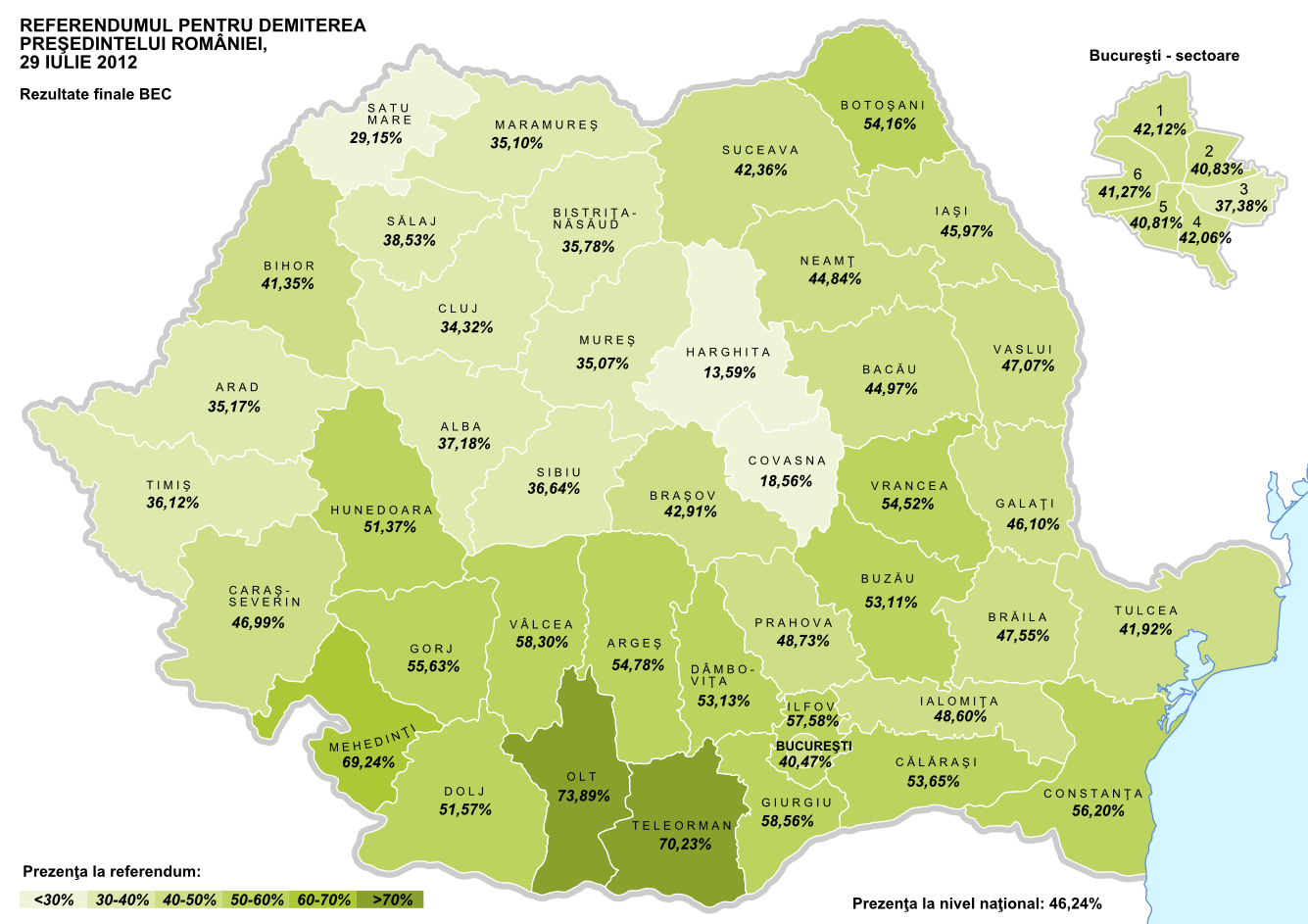
Map of turnout at Romanian presidential impeachment referendum, 29 July 2012

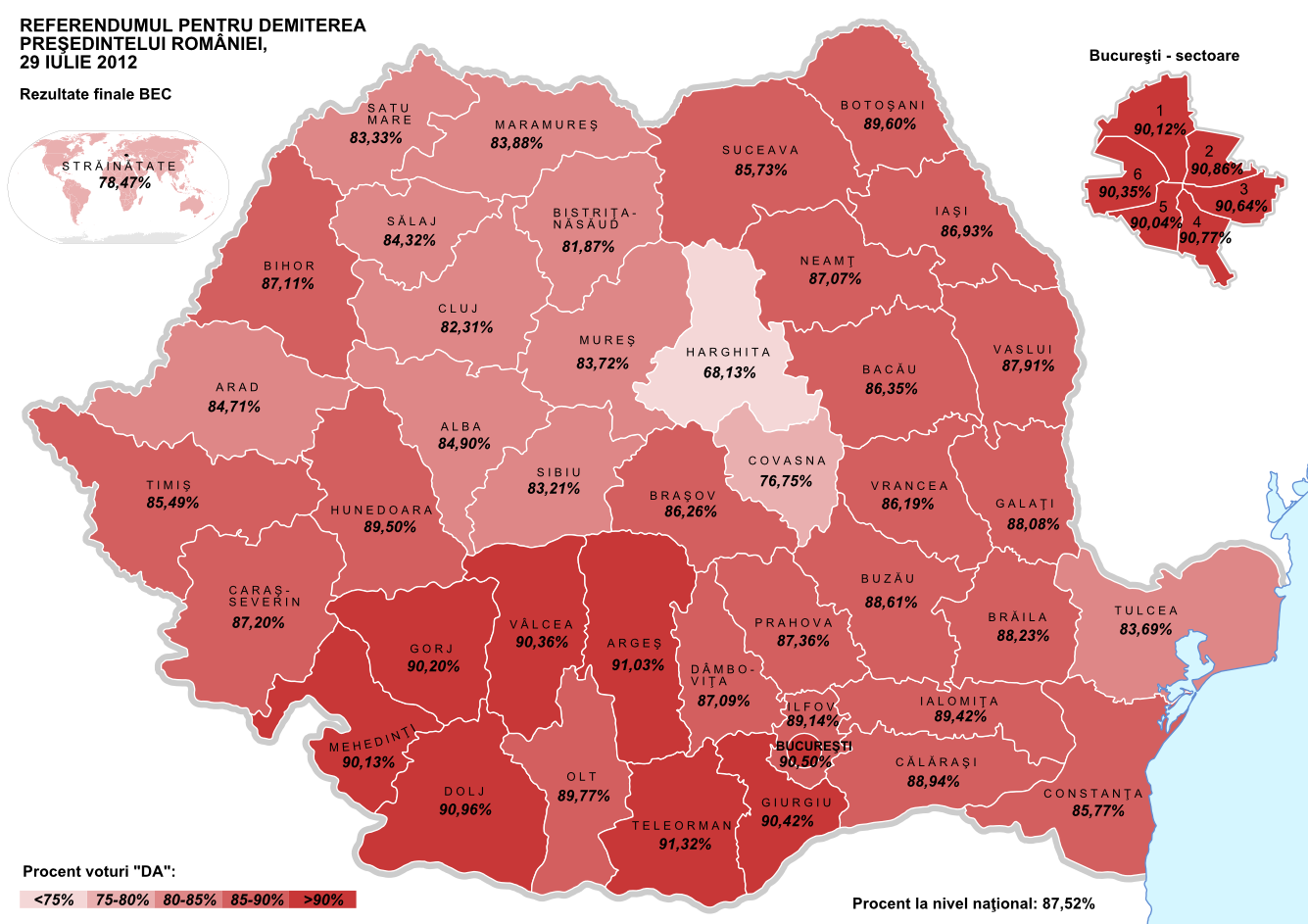
Map of the YES votes at Romanian presidential impeachment referendum, 29 July 2012

Voters were asked the question "Do you agree with the dismissal of the President of Romania Mr Traian Băsescu?" (Romanian: Sunteți de acord cu demiterea Președintelui României, domnul Traian Băsescu?). Exit polls showed more than 80 per cent voted for the impeachment of the president.

The turnout at 23:00 (poll closing time) was estimated to be of 45.92% with a ±3% error margin. This was based on data from 2,889 of the 18,242 polling stations. This does not take into account the special electoral lists for citizens voting outside their residence area (especially those on vacation throughout the country), unmovable and abroad. The turnout of under 50% rendered the referendum results as invalid even though 86% of those who voted supported the impeachment.

The turnout was estimated to have been around 51.6% in rural areas and 41.8% in cities, with Bucharest at 40.0%. The highest turnout was reported in Muntenia with a turnout of over 50% and some counties having over 60%, including Olt, 74.7%; Mehedinți, 70.5%; Teleorman, 70.2%; Giurgiu, 60.7%; and Vâlcea, 60.4%. Eight polling stations in Olt County had a turnout of over 100%, the highest being 126%. In other parts of Romania the turnout was below 50%, with the lowest in Transylvania. The counties with the lowest turnout were Harghita, 11.6%; Covasna, 20.6%; Satu Mare, 28.2%; Mureș, 34.0%; and Arad, 35.0%.

Choice	Votes	%
For	7,403,836	88.70
Against	943,375	11.30
Total	8,347,211	100.00
Valid votes	8,347,211	98.68
Invalid/blank votes	111,842	1.32
Total votes	8,459,053	100.00
Registered voters/turnout	18,292,464	46.24
Source: Romanian Electoral Commission

== Reactions ==
After the first results were published, president Băsescu declared that "the flame of democracy has remained alight. Romanians have rejected the coup d'etat." Ponta declared that his government "will respect all decisions of the Constitutional Court and will act as a factor of stability in the next period, regardless of whether the referendum is validated or not". Ponta went on to declare that he is "not going to seek confrontation with Basescu (...) everyone is going to lose if we are continuing to fight", and pledged not to "interfere with the president's prerogatives." He also said, however, that further cooperation with Băsescu would be impossible after the vote against him, stating "We have nothing more to discuss with a man rejected by the citizens". In a letter to the EU, Ponta pledged to accept the ruling of the Court if it will declare the referendum invalid. However, acting president Crin Antonescu, called on the Constitutional Court to take into account the 2011 census figures which he claims better represent "reality", than the current figures of the official electoral register, which would result in a different figure for the voter turnout.

As the results dropped in, relatively peaceful protests were organized in the University Square of Bucharest. People also gathered in front of the National Theatre and the Cotroceni Palace and chanted slogans against president Băsescu.

After publication of partial results by the Central Electoral Bureau, following which the quorum was not comprised for Băsescu's dismissal, former president of Romania Ion Iliescu wanted to clarify for RFI that the Constitutional Court is compelled, taking account of European electoral common laws and the Venice Commission's recommendation that no threshold should be imposed, to consider the 29 July referendum valid.

== Verdict ==
The Romanian constitutional court subsequently declared the referendum invalid by a vote of 6–3 due to the fact that turnout did not reach 50%. The move reinstated Băsescu as president of Romania. Acting President Crin Antonescu, however, said that Băsescu was an "illegitimate" leader because he was suspended by parliament. As a reaction to the verdict, hundreds of protesters took to the streets in Bucharest, calling for Băsescu's resignation.
