= Ion Chinezu =

Austro-Hungarian-born Romanian literary critic and translator

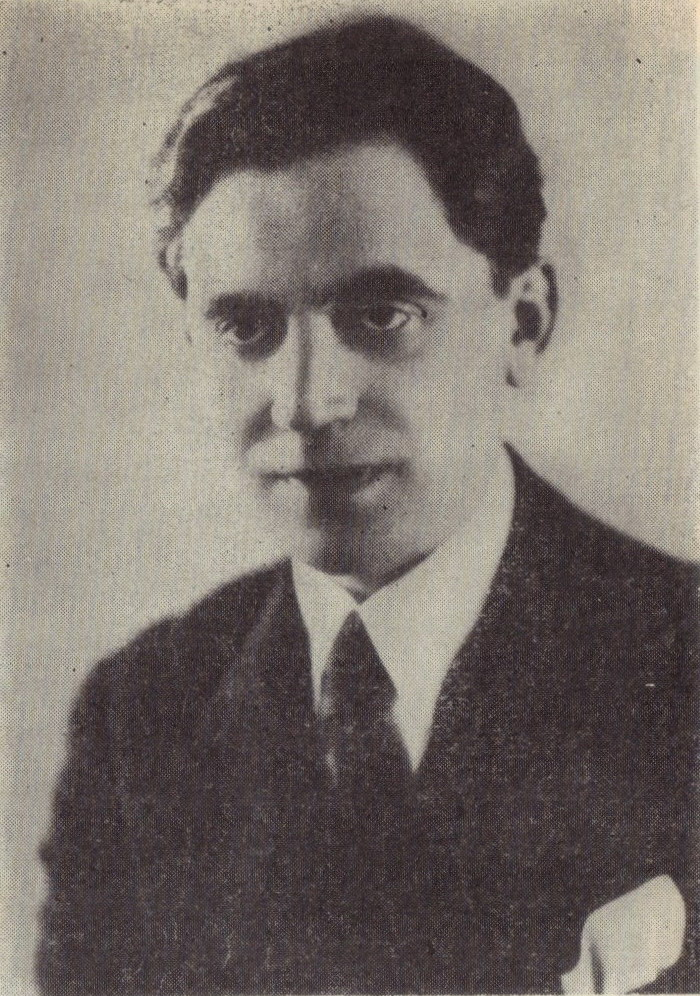
Ion Chinezu

Ion Chinezu (August 15, 1894 – December 10, 1966) was an Austro-Hungarian-born Romanian literary critic and translator.

== Biography ==
Born in Sântana de Mureș, Mureș County, in the Transylvania region, his parents Ion Chinezu and Ana (née Hosu) were peasants. After attending high school in his native village, he entered the Catholic high school in nearby Târgu Mureș. A member of the Romanian Greek-Catholic Church, he studied theology in its spiritual center of Blaj, and subsequently studied literature at Budapest and Bucharest universities. In 1920, following the union of Transylvania with Romania, he obtained a degree in Romanian and Romance philology from the latter institution. From 1920 to 1925, he taught Romanian language at Alexandru Papiu Ilarian High School in Târgu Mureș, and from 1925 to 1940 at George Barițiu High School in Cluj. He contributed to a few projects undertaken by the Museum of the Romanian Language in the latter city: Dicționarul limbii române, Atlasul lingvistic al României and the bibliographies of Dacoromania. In 1930, he obtained a doctorate from the University of Cluj with a thesis that dealt with aspects of Hungarian literature in Transylvania from 1919 to 1929. From 1930 to 1932, he studied on a scholarship at the Sorbonne. Together with Victor Papilian, he edited Darul vremii magazine in 1930, and between 1935 and 1940 was head of the most prestigious interwar Transylvanian magazine, Gând românesc. He also initiated a series of conferences about "Transylvanian energies". He was honorary teaching assistant in the department of Romanian cultural history at Cluj, created in 1931 for Octavian Goga.

In 1940, after the Second Vienna Award granted Northern Transylvania to Hungary, he moved to Bucharest. Entering the diplomatic service, he was sent to the Romanian embassy in Budapest. Toward the end of 1944, the Nazi German troops who had occupied Hungary during Operation Margarethe deported Chinezu to Germany. He returned to Romania in 1945, and focused on translation work. From 1949 to 1964, during the first phase of the communist regime, he translated a large number of short stories, novels and plays from both classical and contemporary Hungarian literature, signing with the pen names P. Mureșanu, Andrei Aldea and Alexandru Aldea. His contributions appeared in Mureșul, Dacoromania, Erdélyi Helikon, Societatea de mâine, Boabe de grâu, and Revista Fundațiilor Regale. A skilled critic of Romanian and foreign literature, he sought to raise the literary prominence of Pavel Dan and of the younger interwar Transylvanian writers. He was particularly involved in promoting relations between Romanian and Hungarian authors.
