= Romanian Social Democratic Party =

Romanian Social Democratic Party may refer to:

- Social Democratic Party (Romania), a current Romanian party.
- Romanian Social Democratic Party (1990–2001), a former Romanian political party, that formed the Social Democratic Party (PSD) by fusing with the Party of Social Democracy in Romania (PDSR) in January 2001.
- Romanian Social Democratic Party (1927–1948)
- Social Democratic Party of Romania (1910–1918)
