= Sântana de Mureș =

Sântana de Mureș Marosszentanna
- Commune
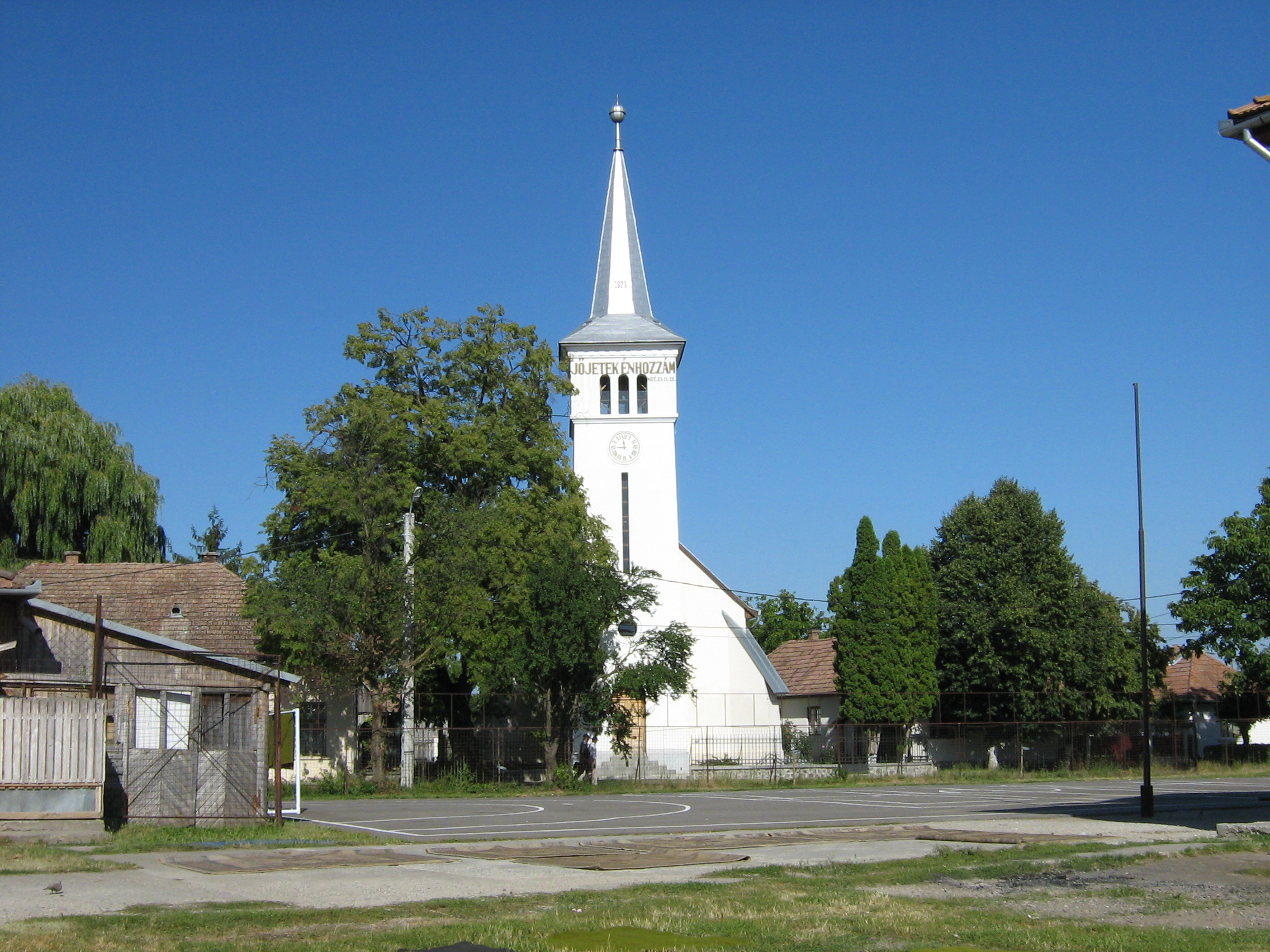
- Reformed (Presbyterian) Church

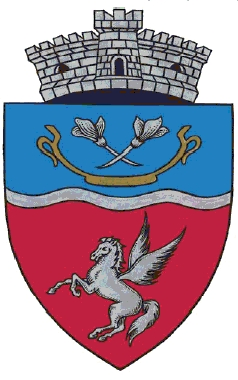
- Coat of arms

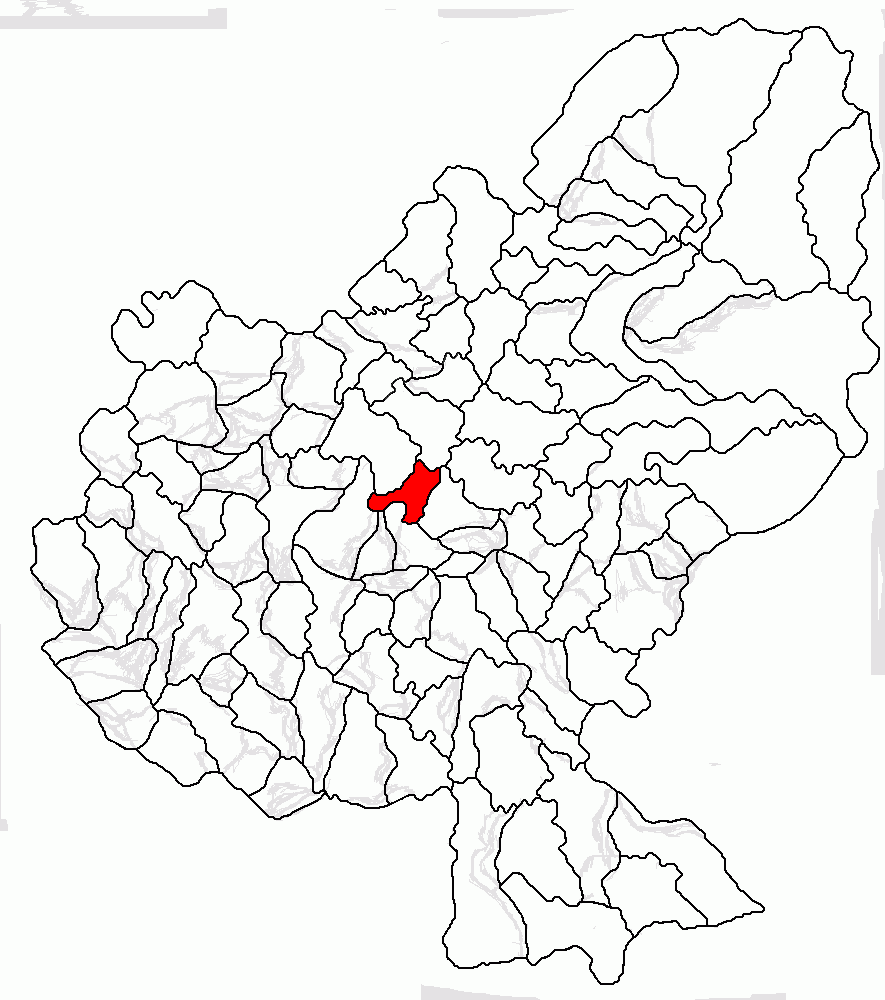
- Location in Mureș County

- Location in Romania
- Coordinates: 46.57°N 24.55°E
- Country: Romania
- County: Mureș

Government
  - Mayor (2020–2024): Dumitru Moldovan (Ind.)
- Area: 25.98 km^{2} (10.03 sq mi)
- Elevation: 319 m (1,047 ft)
- Population (2021-12-01): 6,612
  - Density: 254.5/km^{2} (659.2/sq mi)
- Time zone: UTC+02:00 (EET)
  - Summer (DST): UTC+03:00 (EEST)
- Postal code: 547565
- Area code: (+40) 0265
- Vehicle reg.: MS
- Website: www.sintana.ro

Sântana de Mureș (Hungarian: Marosszentanna, Hungarian pronunciation: [ˈmɒroʃsɛntɒnnɒ]; German: Sankt Anna an der Mieresch) is a commune in Mureș County, Transylvania, Romania, composed of four villages: Bărdești (Marosbárdos), Chinari (Várhegy; Schlossberg), Curteni (Udvarfalva), and Sântana de Mureș.

The commune is situated in the central part of the Transylvanian Plateau, at an altitude of 319 m (1,047 ft), on the banks of the Mureș River and its right tributary, the river Voiniceni. It is located just north of the county seat, Târgu Mureș, and belongs to the surrounding metropolitan area.

== History ==
=== Ancient times ===
The Sântana de Mureș-Chernyakhov culture which flourished between the 2nd and 5th centuries AD in Eastern Europe was named after the sites discovered at Sântana de Mureș and at Cherniakhiv in Ukraine. The culture was spread across what today constitutes Ukraine, Romania, Moldova, and parts of Belarus. It probably corresponds to the Gothic kingdom of Oium as described by Jordanes in his work Getica, but it is nonetheless the result of a poly-ethnic cultural mélange of the Gothic, Getae-Dacian, Sarmatian and Slavic populations of the area.

=== Modern times ===
Sântana de Mureș was part of the Székely Land region of Transylvania. Until 1918, the village belonged to the Maros-Torda County of the Kingdom of Hungary. In the immediate aftermath of World War I, following the declaration of the Union of Transylvania with Romania, the area passed under Romanian administration during the Hungarian–Romanian War of 1918–1919. By the terms of the Treaty of Trianon of 1920, it became part of the Kingdom of Romania.

In 1925, Sântana de Mureș became part of plasa Mureș de Sus, within Mureș County. In 1940, the Second Vienna Award granted Northern Transylvania to Hungary. Towards the end of World War II, Romanian and Soviet armies entered the area in October 1944. The territory of Northern Transylvania remained under Soviet military administration until March 1945, after which it became again part of Romania. Between 1952 and 1960, Sântana de Mureș fell within the Magyar Autonomous Region, between 1960 and 1968 the Mureș-Magyar Autonomous Region, and since then, the commune has been part of Mureș County.

== Demographics ==
Historical population
| Year | Pop. | ±% |
|---|---|---|
| 1850 | 1,837 | — |
| 1930 | 2,988 | +62.7% |
| 1977 | 4,316 | +44.4% |
| 2002 | 4,266 | −1.2% |
| 2011 | 5,723 | +34.2% |
| 2021 | 6,612 | +15.5% |
Source: Census data

According to the 2011 census, the commune had a population of 5,723 of which 50.1% were Romanians, 40.3% Hungarians, and 6.8% Roma. At the 2021 census, Sântana de Mureș had 6,612 inhabitants; of those, 53.61% were Romanians, 32.8% Hungarians, and 6.5% Roma.

== Natives ==
- Ion Chinezu (1894–1966), literary critic and translator

== See also ==
- Sântana de Mureș-Chernyakhov culture
- List of Hungarian exonyms (Mureș County)
