= President of Romania =

Head of state

- Președintele României
- Standard of the president of Romania

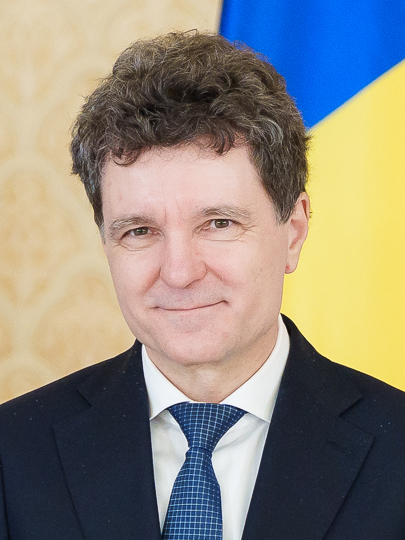
- Incumbent; Nicușor Dan since 26 May 2025
- Style: Mr. President (informal); His Excellency (formal)
- Status: Head of state Commander-in-chief
- Member of: Supreme Council of National Defence; European Council
- Residence: Cotroceni Palace
- Appointer: Popular vote
- Term length: Five years, renewable once
- Constituting instrument: Constitution of Romania (1991)
- Inaugural holder: Nicolae Ceaușescu (first established); Ion Iliescu (current constitution)
- Formation: 28 March 1974; 52 years ago 8 December 1991; 34 years ago (current form)
- Deputy: President of the Senate
- Salary: 324,000 lei annually (2015)
- Website: Președintele României

The president of Romania (Romanian: Președintele României) is the head of state of Romania. The president is directly elected by a two-round system, and, following a modification to the Romanian Constitution in 2003, serves for five years. An individual may serve two terms that may be consecutive. During their term in office, the president may not be a formal member of a political party. The president of Romania is the supreme commander of the Romanian Armed Forces.

The office of president was created in 1974 when communist leader Nicolae Ceaușescu elevated the presidency of the State Council to a fully fledged executive presidency. It took its current form in stages after the Romanian Revolution, culminating in adopting Romania's current constitution in 1991.

Nicușor Dan is the 6th and current president since 26 May 2025.

== Communist era ==
In the Communist era, the president was elected for a five-year term by the Great National Assembly (GNA) on the recommendation of the Romanian Communist Party's Central Committee and the Front of Socialist Unity and Democracy, with no term limits. Ceaușescu was the only holder of the office under this system; he was elected by the GNA in 1974 and reelected in 1980 and 1985, each time unopposed. The president continued to serve as ex officio president of the State Council and had the right to act on any matter that did not require a State Council plenum. He also appointed and dismissed ministers and heads of central agencies. When the GNA was not in session (in practice, for most of the year), the president could appoint and dismiss the president of the Supreme Court and the prosecutor general without the State Council's approval; indeed, he was not even required to consult his State Council colleagues when making such decisions. Ceaușescu created the office to make himself the chief decision-maker in both name and fact. Previously, he had nominally been first among equals on the State Council, deriving his real power from his leadership of the Communist Party. In practice, he used his power to act on all matters that did not require a plenum to rule by decree. Over time, he also usurped many powers that constitutionally belonged to the State Council as a whole.

== Oath of office ==
After the Constitutional Court acknowledges the legality of the election, the Houses of Parliament meet in a joint session. The elected president takes the following oath of office, specified by article 82 of the Constitution:

Romanian: Jur să-mi dăruiesc toată puterea și priceperea pentru propășirea spirituală și materială a poporului român, să respect Constituția și legile țării, să apăr democrația, drepturile și libertățile fundamentale ale cetățenilor, suveranitatea, independența, unitatea și integritatea teritorială a României. Așa să-mi ajute Dumnezeu!

I solemnly swear that I will dedicate all my strength and the best of my ability to the spiritual and material welfare of the Romanian people, to abide by the Constitution and laws of the country, to defend democracy, the fundamental rights and freedoms of my fellow-citizens, Romania's sovereignty, independence, unity and territorial integrity. So help me God!

== Powers and duties ==
Under the 1991 Constitution, which was amended in 2003, presidential powers were curtailed in contrast to communist Romania; the office continues to wield significant influence within a semi-presidential system of government.

The president's duties are set out in Title III, Chapter II of the Constitution. These are not exclusive, and are supplemented by other constitutional and legal provisions.

In home affairs:

- Embodies the state and safeguards its independence, unity and territorial integrity.
- Guards the observance of the Constitution and the functioning of public authorities.
- Designates and appoints the prime minister, subject to parliamentary approval (the president cannot dismiss the Prime Minister).
- Appoints and removes ministers on the advice of the prime minister (a proposal by the prime minister may be rejected only once; in such cases, the prime minister cannot re-submit the same nomination for ministerial office; the president cannot refuse the appointment of a second, different, nominee).
- Consult the Government on major policy matters.
- Chairs Government when matters of national interest about foreign policy, the defence of the country or public order are debated and, at the prime minister's request, in other instances as well.
- Addresses Parliament on issues of national interest.
- Assents to bills (the president may ask Parliament to reconsider a bill only once).
- Refers bills for review to the Constitutional Court before signifying his assent.
- Summons Parliament after a legislative election.
- Requests extraordinary sessions of Parliament.
- Dissolves Parliament (The president may dissolve Parliament if no vote of confidence has been obtained to form a government within 60 days after the first request was made and only after the rejection of at least two prime ministerial candidates).
- Calls referendums (after consultation with Parliament). Such referendums are advisory, and Parliament may choose not to implement their result. However, if a referendum is valid (this requires a majority vote in favour and above 30% turnout), Parliament may not legislate contrary to the referendum result.

In foreign affairs:

- Undertakes state, official and working visits overseas.
- Concludes international treaties negotiated by the Government and submits them to Parliament for ratification.
- Appoints and recalls ambassadors and diplomatic envoys on the advice of the prime minister and the minister of foreign affairs (following such advice is not mandatory).
- Receives letters of credence from foreign diplomatic envoys.
- Approves the setting up, closing down, or change in rank of diplomatic missions.

In defence issues:

- Exerts the role of Commander-in-Chief of the Armed Forces.
- Presides over the Supreme Council of National Defence.
- Declares mobilisation of the Armed Forces, subject to prior approval from Parliament (or, in special circumstances, subsequent approval).
- Acts to repel armed aggression towards the country.
- Institutes the state of siege or the state of emergency (nationally or locally, with subsequent parliamentary approval).

Other duties:

- Confers decorations and titles of honour.
- Makes appointments to senior military ranks.
- Makes appointments to public offices as provided by law.
- Grants individual pardons.

In the exercise of his functions, the president issues decrees. Decrees issued under Article 91 (1) and (2), Article 92 (2) and (3), Article 93 (1), and Article 94 a), b) and d) of the Constitution must be countersigned by the Prime Minister to take effect.

== Impeachment ==
An incumbent president who severely violates the Constitution may be suspended by the Parliament in a joint session. If the suspension motion passes, there is a call for a referendum of impeachment within no more than 30 days of the suspension.

If the Senate and Chamber of Deputies, in joint session, accuse the president of high treason, the president is suspended from powers and duties by right. The accusations are judged by the High Court of Cassation and Justice. The incumbent president is dismissed by right if found guilty of high treason.

=== History ===
The suspension and impeachment procedure has been implemented three times. The first time regarded President Ion Iliescu, following a statement regarding the returning of the illegally confiscated properties during the years of the Socialist Republic of Romania to the original owners or their heirs. This first attempt in 1995 did not pass the vote in Parliament.

The second attempt was successful, with the person suspended being Traian Băsescu, in office as of April 2007. He became the first president to successfully be suspended and also the first to face an impeachment vote before the people regarding issues with supposed unconstitutional acts. The impeachment plebiscite was held on 19 May 2007, and Băsescu survived the impeachment attempt. The result was the rejection of the proposal by 24.94% in favor to 75.06% opposed.

The third attempt led to a second successful suspension in July 2012, again against Traian Băsescu. The referendum was held on 29 July 2012, and the results were 88.7% in favor and 11.3% opposed, with voter turnout calculated to be 46.24%, below the 50% + one vote threshold required at the time the referendum was held. The Constitutional Court did not give a verdict on the validation of the referendum at the time, citing irregularities in the permanent electoral lists. On 21 August, the Court deemed the referendum invalid, and again, Băsescu prevailed from being ousted.

A proposal for a fourth attempt culminated with Klaus Iohannis resigning as President of Romania on 12 February 2025 in order to "not create a divided Romania".

== Succession ==
Should the office of the president become vacant due to resignation, impeachment, permanent inability to perform the duties of office, or death while in office, the president of the Senate becomes acting president. If the president of the Senate is also vacant when the presidency becomes vacant, the president of the Chamber of Deputies becomes acting president.

Neither has to relinquish their position as president of their respective Legislative House for the duration of the ad interim term. The acting president cannot address the Parliament, dissolve the Parliament, nor call for a referendum (the impeachment referendum after a motion of suspension is called by Parliament). The vacancy of the office cannot be longer than three months. While the president is suspended, the office is not considered vacant.

== Latest election ==
Electoral performance of candidates from the PSD, PNL and PD/PDL in the first round of Romanian presidential elections, 2000–2024

Candidate	Party	First round		Second round	
Candidate	Party	Votes	%	Votes	%
George Simion	Alliance for the Union of Romanians (Note: Endorsed by POT)	3,862,761	40.96	5,339,053	46.40
Nicușor Dan	Independent (Note: Endorsed by DREPT, PMP, FD, REPER, RîA, PV, USR, SENS and EMSZ)	1,979,767	20.99	6,168,642	53.60
Crin Antonescu	Romania Forward Electoral Alliance (Note: Endorsed by ethnic minority parties)	1,892,930	20.07		
Victor Ponta	Independent (Note: Endorsed by PER, PRO, RoSAT, PRM and PPMP)	1,230,164	13.04		
Elena Lasconi	Save Romania Union	252,721	2.68		
Lavinia Șandru	Social Liberal Humanist Party	60,682	0.64		
Daniel Funeriu	Independent	49,604	0.53		
Cristian Terheș	Romanian National Conservative Party	36,445	0.39		
Sebastian Popescu	New Romania Party	25,994	0.28		
John Ion Banu	Independent	22,020	0.23		
Silviu Predoiu	National Action League Party	17,186	0.18		
Total		9,430,274	100.00	11,507,695	100.00
Valid votes		9,430,274	98.52	11,507,695	98.85
Invalid/blank votes		141,466	1.48	134,171	1.15
Total votes		9,571,740	100.00	11,641,866	100.00
Registered voters/turnout		17,988,031	53.21	17,988,218	64.72
Source: Permanent Electoral Authority

== See also ==
- Lifespan timeline of heads of state of Romania
- List of heads of state of Romania
- List of presidents of Romania
- List of heads of government of Romania
- List of presidents of Romania by time in office
- Government of Romania
