= 2007 Romanian presidential impeachment referendum =

- 19 May 2007
- Do you agree with the dismissal of the President of Romania, Mr. Traian Băsescu?

Results
Choice	Votes	%
Yes	2,013,099	24.94%
No	6,059,315	75.06%
Valid votes	8,072,414	99.23%
Invalid or blank votes	62,858	0.77%
Total votes	8,135,272	100.00%
Registered voters/turnout	18,301,309	44.45%
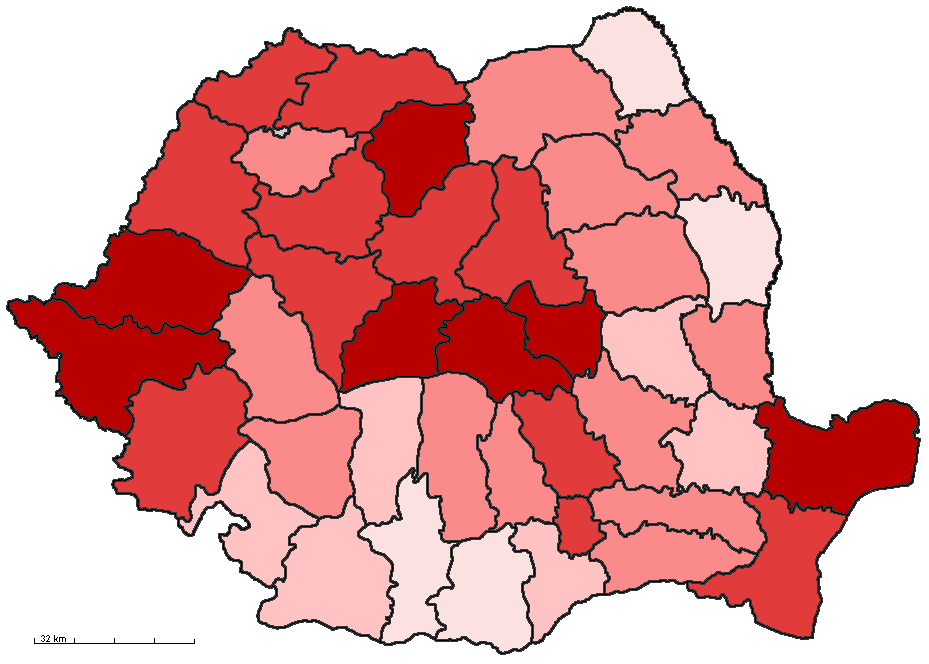
Results by county.
No:
>80%
75-80%
70-75%
65-70%
<65%
- Referendum held: 19 May 2007; Source: Biroul Electoral Central

A presidential impeachment referendum was held in Romania on 19 May 2007 in order to determine whether president Traian Băsescu should be forced to step down.

On 19 April 2007 the Romanian parliament suspended Băsescu. As the Constitutional Court of Romania acknowledged the Parliament's vote on the following day, Băsescu remained suspended from the position of president until the referendum would clarify the situation. It took place on 19 May 2007 and confirmed that the impeachment should not stand. 24.75% voted to impeach Băsescu, while 74.48% wanted to keep him in office.

Although not impeached, Băsescu is the first president in the history of Romania who has been officially suspended.

== Impeachment vote by Parliament ==
In early 2007, Băsescu was proposed for impeachment by the members of the opposition parties for allegedly unconstitutional conduct. One of the major issues in the confrontation was the activity of justice minister Monica Macovei, who politicized the prosecutors appointment, taking it away from the Superior Council of Magistrature and assigning it to herself and the president. Among the main reasons given in the proposal to suspend Băsescu were:

- Infringing upon and "substituting the authority" of the government, the judicial system and the parliament.
- Committing acts of "political partisanship" with direct reference to the Democratic Party, abuse of power and acting more like a "judge of the other public authorities" than a "collaborator", thus "abandoning his role of impartial mediator required by the Romanian constitution."
- Manipulating and "instigating public opinion against other state institutions" such as the parliament and the government.

Băsescu and his supporters denied the accusations, stating that his actions and statements were ways of fighting against corruption in the political and judicial systems and against "circles of business interests" with unlawful purposes.

The Constitutional Court of Romania found no clear evidence of his breach of the constitution in the sense required by the fundamental law. However, the court ruling was only consultative and the two chambers of the parliament voted in favor of Băsescu's impeachment on 19 April 2007, with 322 votes for the impeachment proposal, 108 against it and 8 abstentions (the minimum number of votes needed was 233). Băsescu contested the decision, but the constitutional court rejected his appeal as inadmissible and upheld the vote.

In the meantime, Macovei and several other ministers which supported the president were dismissed by prime minister Popescu-Tăriceanu, while the European election has been postponed until at least the fall of 2007. The pro-president media have characterized the anti-Băsescu coalition as the "black alliance," noting that it contained both Social-Democrats and National-Liberals, Hungarian minority MPs and ultra-nationalists.

== After the impeachment vote ==
As a result of the impeachment vote by the parliament, Băsescu was suspended from his function as president on April 19, 2007 and a national referendum was held on 19 May 2007 to decide by popular vote whether to dismiss the president. According to the electoral law (article 5(2) of the referendum law), an absolute majority of all Romanians with the right to vote is required for a positive result in a dismissal referendum, which means that almost nine million people would have had to vote against Băsescu. Otherwise he would regain full prerogatives. If Băsescu had been dismissed by the referendum, early presidential elections would have been called.

The question printed on the ballots was, "Do you agree with the removal of the President of Romania, Mr. Traian Băsescu, from office?". The question was modified to include the name of the president even though article 9 in the law of referendum already established the content of the question without names of presidents.

== Controversy ==
On 17 April Băsescu stated that if Parliament voted for his impeachment, he would resign "five minutes" after the vote, avoiding a referendum for dismissal and triggering early presidential elections. However, on 20 April he decided not to resign, claiming he wished to limit the period of political instability.

Băsescu and his supporters in the Democratic Party also suggested that his political opponents would try to modify the electoral law in order to obstruct a previously suspended president to run in the elections again, following a Rolandas Paksas scenario.

On 25 April, the constitutional court approved the modifications brought by parliament to the referendum law. The new article 10 (regarding the presidential impeachment process) considers that the impeachment process "will be approved through the majority of votes for the participants at the referendum and article 5(2) does not apply to this type of referendum." Therefore, the 19 May referendum remained valid, despite the participation of less than 40% of eligible Romanians. However, since only a 25% minority of voters voted in the affirmative, Băsescu regained full prerogatives on May 24, after the referendum results were confirmed.

=== Validity in case of low voter turnout ===
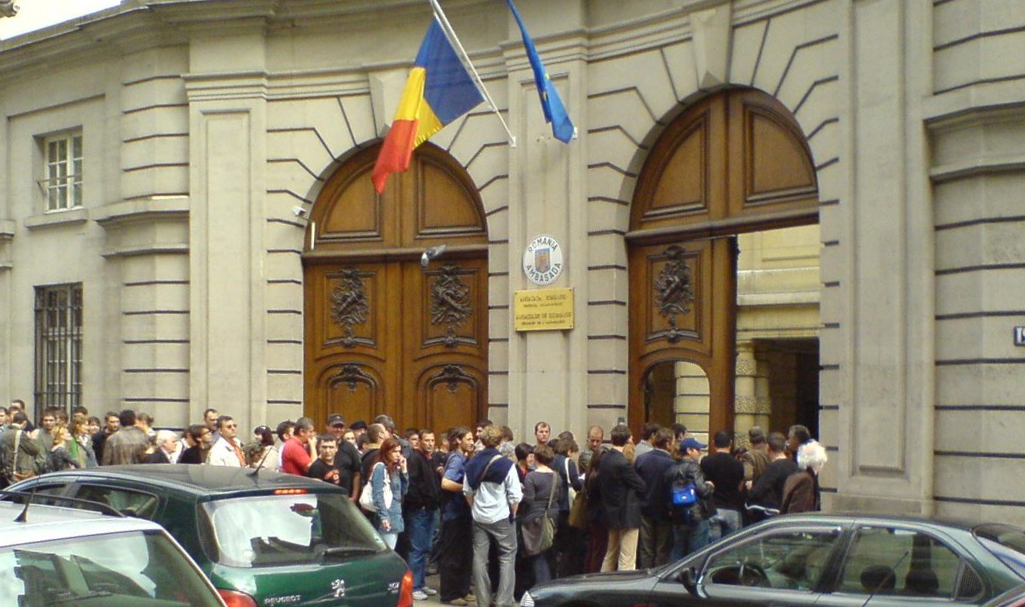
People voting in Paris before the closure of voting booths.

On 24 April, the parliament voted to organize the referendum on 19 May and included an amendment of the opposition which stipulated that in case the constitutional court found the referendum invalid, parliament would decide on further procedures.

The decision started a new debate on the referendum issue generated by the law not providing for the hypothesis that the referendum to dismiss the president would be considered formally not valid by the constitutional Law on account of low turnout. According to paragraph (2) of article 5 in the law no. 3/2000, a referendum is valid only if the majority of citizens registered in the electoral lists participates in the referendum, regardless of their votes or the validity of their votes once they have participated. This condition applies to all referendums and only if met, the referendum will be held as formally valid by the constitutional court. But neither the constitution nor the law on referendums give any solution to the invalidity issue as to what would happen afterwards with the legal effects of the suspension vote or the re-instatement of the president with full prerogatives.

Supporters of the idea that the referendum will have to be repeated - with the president suspended in the meantime - base their claim on article 95 in the constitution which does not provide a limit in time as to the effects of a suspension vote by the parliament.

Another difficulty that arose from this argument is that a suspension vote would actually become a dismissal vote in case of low voter turnout since several referendums would have to be held with the president suspended while article 95 says that only "a referendum" will be held and this will be done only "in 30 days" from the day of suspension. In addition, it was claimed that it cannot be reasonably inferred that low voter turnout equals a will to dismiss the president by the people and parliament does not have the power to make this decision either.

Supporters of the president rebut the argument, stating that article 95 calls for a referendum to be held in 30 days to dismiss the president by popular vote and that article 8 in the law on referendums states that the referendum is mandatory. Since the referendum is the expression of national sovereignty that belongs to the Romanian people, only a positive result to dismiss the president will preclude Băsescu from regaining full prerogatives once the referendum is held at the date established. Save for a positive result to dismiss him, Băsescu will regain full prerogatives the next day after the vote, regardless of participation rates or the validity of the referendum. This argument does not address the issue of the time limit for the suspension or that a valid referendum will have to legitimize again the reinstatement as president once he was suspended because only a valid referendum is the expression of national sovereignty not an invalid one.

Should the referendum be invalid on account of low voter turnout, a possible solution to this constitutional crisis would be a bolder decision of the constitutional court that would have to address the debate directly and issue a decision on reinstatement as well. A second possible solution is for the government to repeal the text of article 5 (2) on participation requirements through an emergency ordinance. Finally, resignation of the president would end his mandate and the issue by triggering presidential elections.

=== Support rallies for Băsescu ===
After he was suspended, Băsescu took part in several support rallies in which he continued to criticize the 322 MPs who had voted against him and made reference to an alleged conspiracy of corrupt political leaders and a "business oligarchy" that led to his impeachment. He also stated that he would not "negotiate" with his adversaries in order to maintain his office and that he would continue to fight against corruption once reinstated by the referendum.

Băsescu's political opponents replied by accusing him of always "seeking conflict" and "inventing enemies" in order to maintain a favourable public image of "fighter for justice." Mircea Geoană, leader of the opposition Social Democratic Party stated that Băsescu's participation in the rallies was illegal because "it took place before the official start of the electoral campaign for the referendum."

== Results ==
Early exit polls indicated a win for the president. Voter turnout had been low, a fact emphasized by both sides. Although the president was still suspended pending official results, both he and the opposing political coalition made statements acknowledging his imminent return as active president.

Two exit polls were conducted among the participants in the referendum. An Insomar/Metro Media poll showed 75 percent of voters saying "No" to ousting Băsescu. A CURS Institute poll put the figure at 78.1 percent.

A common statement by the European Popular Party leaders Joseph Daul and Wilfried Martens, published one hour after the result of the vote "welcomes the decision of the Romanian people in today’s referendum to reject a call to remove president Traian Basescu from office". BBC News reported on the population's attitude by citing the answer from a teacher's interview "I've got sick of living in a country run by thieves. Only Băsescu can help us get rid of them"

Over 50% presence was registered only in Bucharest (where the votes of Romanians living abroad were added to the local votes), Sibiu, Braşov and Constanţa counties. The highest percentage favouring impeachment was registered at Botoşani (39.69%), Teleorman (37.27%), Vaslui (35.34%) and Olt (35.53%)

Choice	Votes	%
For	2,013,099	24.94
Against	6,059,315	75.06
Total	8,072,414	100.00
Valid votes	8,072,414	99.23
Invalid/blank votes	62,858	0.77
Total votes	8,135,272	100.00
Registered voters/turnout	18,301,309	44.45
Source: Romanian Electoral Commission
