= Nicolae Cristea (priest) =

Austro-Hungarian priest, professor, journalist and political activist

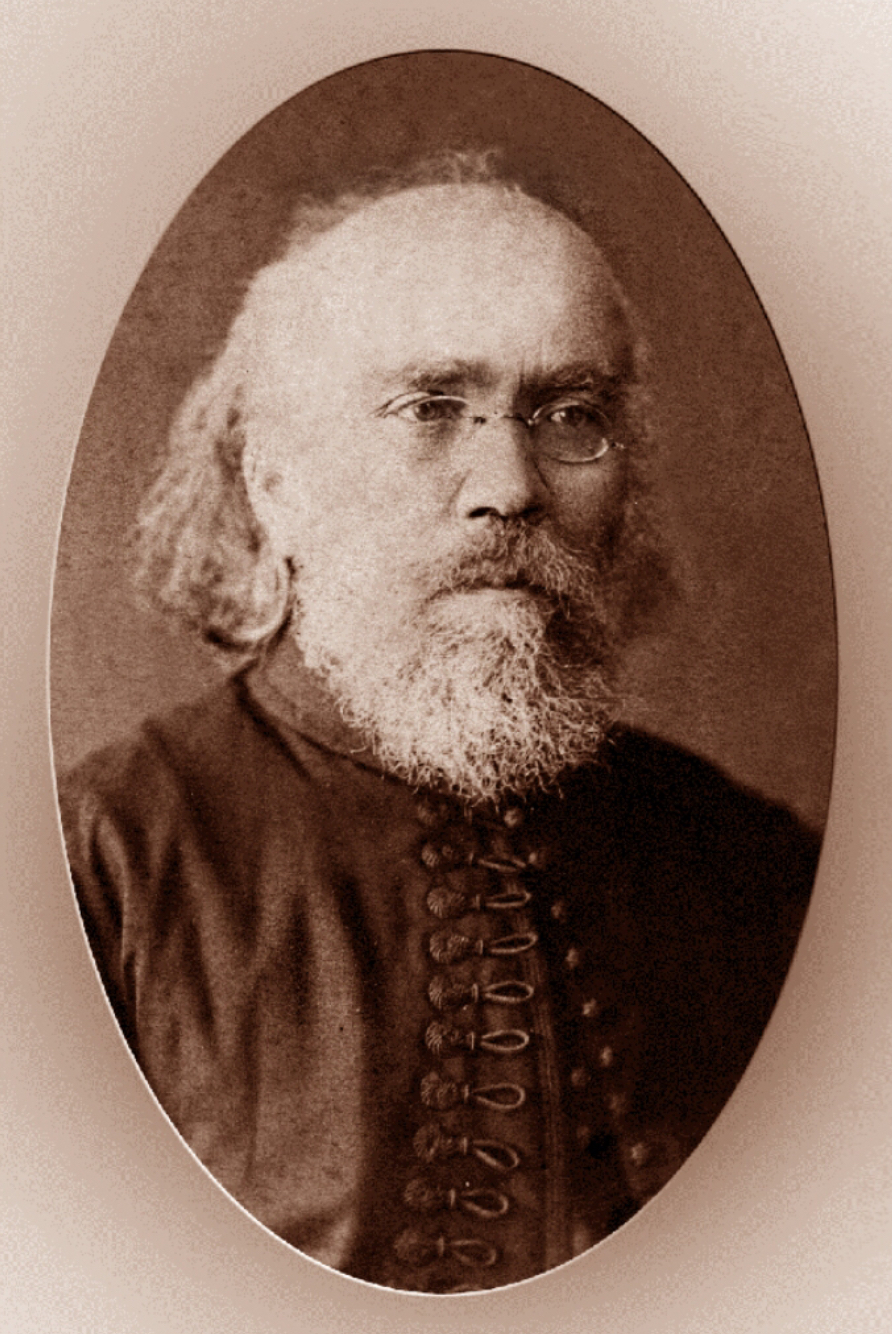
Nicolae Cristea

Nicolae Cristea (October 26 [O.S. October 14] 1834 – February 7, 1902) was an Austro-Hungarian ethnic Romanian Orthodox priest, professor, journalist and political activist. A protégé of Andrei Șaguna, he studied in Germany before returning to edit the church's newspaper for nearly two decades, a period during which he also taught at the theological seminary in Sibiu. He was politically active, a stance that culminated in the early 1890s with his signing of the Transylvanian Memorandum and subsequent imprisonment.

== Biography ==
=== Origins and education ===
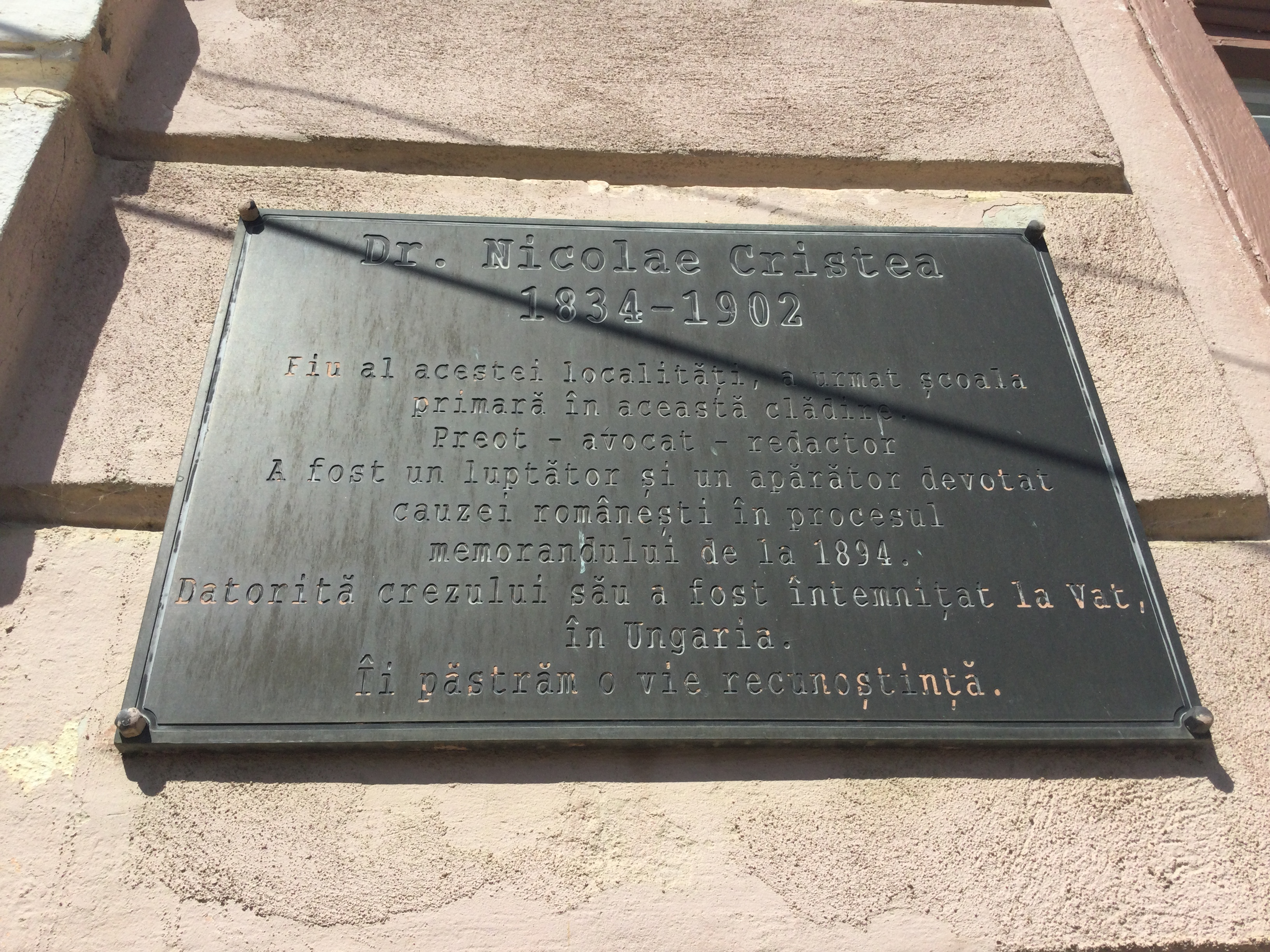
Plaque honoring Cristea, placed on his primary school in Ocna Sibiului

Born to peasant parents in Ocna Sibiului, in the Transylvania region, he began primary school in his native village before continuing at a Roman Catholic school in nearby Sibiu. He attended the state high school there, also Catholic in orientation: from 1848 to 1850, his courses were in Latin, and then in German until graduation. In 1857, he became a student at the city's theological academy, remaining there until 1859. While enrolled at the school, he met his eventual patron, Archbishop Andrei Șaguna. The latter appreciated Cristea's qualities and in 1859 advised him to enter the law faculty. He consented, and at the same time became a clerk at the archbishop's chancery.

Sent by Șaguna to the University of Leipzig in order to deepen his studies of philosophy and political economy, his 1861–1863 stay of two years was too brief for a doctorate, and Cristea remained with two undergraduate degrees in theology and law. While in Leipzig, he was a church singer at the local Romanian chapel. He also corrected some erroneous information presented by Heinrich von Treitschke, for which the professor publicly apologized.

=== Teaching and journalism ===
In 1870, he married Eleftera Manole, the sister of a Brașov businessman, and was ordained a priest later that year. Teaching church history and canon law, he was a substitute professor at the theological academy from 1863 to 1865 and a full professor of homiletics and moral theology from 1870 to 1873. At that point, he was named an archdiocesan advisor, remaining as such until his death. In 1865, he was named director of Telegraful Român newspaper, remaining until 1883, when he was dismissed by Metropolitan Miron Romanul after writing a scathing critique of Prime Minister Kálmán Tisza.

During a period that saw the loss of Transylvania's autonomy as a result of the Austro-Hungarian Compromise of 1867 and a concerted Magyarization effort, Cristea consistently defended the rights of the province's Romanians. Like his mentor, he promoted an activist stance through polemical articles, and the widely read newspaper turned a profit for the first time. In 1877–1878, he paid close attention to the ongoing Romanian War of Independence, devoting entire editions to the topic. He protested against the 1879 law that made Hungarian a required subject in Romanian church schools. After Tribuna newspaper was founded in 1884, he occasionally contributed articles there. He took part in the 1881 national conference of Romanian electors, where he delivered a fiery speech that emphasized the lack of political training for local Romanians.

=== Memorandum and aftermath ===
A member of the Romanian National Party, and part of its leadership for a decade beginning in 1884, he helped draft the 1892 Transylvanian Memorandum. Indicted the following year, he and party president Ioan Rațiu vowed to speak only Romanian at their trial, held in May 1894. Cristea defended himself energetically, refusing to disavow his role. He was sentenced to eight months' imprisonment, which he carried out at Vác with the majority of fellow signatories. While there, he wrote a brochure detailing his political convictions. He was granted a furlough in order to bury his son. The court costs were considerable for Cristea, who already had to support four children and received supplemental income from Romanian political circles. Upon being released, his advisor's salary was not paid for months; he was clearly not liked by Metropolitan Miron, whose behavior he criticized vehemently in his diary.

Begun in prison in March 1895, this diary was kept until November 1901, with lengthy and frequent interruptions; it was published in 1999. Dry in tone and rarely treating exceptional events, it reflects the aloof personality of Cristea, marked by political battles. Other topics include the Romanian-language press of Transylvania, his disappointment at Dimitrie Sturdza's suddenly conciliatory policy toward Austria-Hungary upon becoming Prime Minister of Romania, criticism of the new metropolitan Ioan Mețianu, his own gradual withdrawal from politics and his May 1898 visit to the Romanian Old Kingdom. There, he was deeply moved upon seeing the Black Sea at Constanța and impressed by the Anghel Saligny Bridge.

He died in Sibiu; his funeral was officiated by Mețianu and attended by an imposing crowd that included fellow Memorandum signer Rubin Patiția. Cristea was buried at the parish church in the Iosefin neighborhood.
