= Nicolae Popea =

Austro-Hungarian ethnic Romanian bishop and historian

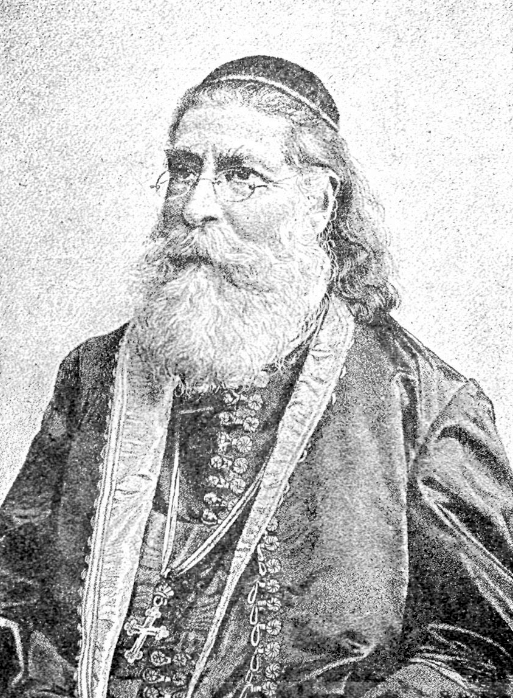
Nicolae Popea

Nicolae Popea (Romanian pronunciation: [nikoˈla.e ˈpope̯a]; born Neagoe Popea [ne̯aˈɡo.e]; March 1 [O.S. February 17] 1826–August 8 [O.S. July 26] 1908) was an Austro-Hungarian ethnic Romanian bishop of the Romanian Orthodox Church, as well as a historian.

== Biography ==
=== Origins and early career ===
He was born into a priestly family in Satulung, Brașov County, a village that today is incorporated into Săcele city, close to Brașov. At the time, the area was part of the Austrian Empire, and was located in the southeast part of the Principality of Transylvania. He attended the Romanian gymnasium in Blaj, an institution run by the Romanian Greek-Catholic Church. From 1843 to 1846, he studied at the law academy in Cluj. His colleagues included Avram Iancu and Alexandru Papiu-Ilarian; together with the latter, Popea edited a weekly publication they distributed to the city's Romanian students. In 1846, he left for the University of Vienna to study theology. Rather than complete his studies, Popea returned home to take part in the 1848 Revolution. He took part in the May assembly at Câmpia Libertății, was elected to the delegation that intended to present the resulting petitions to the Transylvanian Diet and was a captain in the Brașov-based Romanian guards. After the revolution was defeated, he worked in the state administration for several years, first at Deva and then at Șomcuta Mare.

In late 1854, Andrei Șaguna, the Orthodox Metropolitan of Transylvania, summoned Popea to work at the archdiocesan administration in Sibiu, initially as secretary. In a public ceremony held on the Annunciation in 1856, Șaguna tonsured the younger man a monk, with the name Nicolae. He was made a hierodeacon at the same time, later rising to hieromonk and protosingel. Also in 1856, he was named professor of theology at Sibiu's theological and pedagogical institute. He remained a secretary, later rising to diocesan adviser. He taught church history, morals and canon law; his pupils included Zaharia Boiu, Nicolae Cristea, Ilarion Pușcariu, Dimitrie Comșa and Daniil Popovici-Barcianu. Popea taught until 1870, when Șaguna named him archdiocesan vicar, a post he would hold until 1889. In 1871, Șaguna made him an archimandrite. He joined the diocesan and national synods, and presided over the former when the ailing Șaguna was unable to attend.

=== Politics, metropolitan candidacies and move to Caransebeș ===
In the 1860s, Popea began to involve himself in national politics. He served in the Diet from 1863 to 1865, and later in the Austrian House of Lords. He also sat in Hungary's House of Magnates, where he repeatedly spoke on behalf of the Romanian nation and church. From 1878 to 1881, he was president of the National Party of Romanians in Transylvania, and was a proponent of the activist strategy that called for participation in political life. In 1881, he renounced this honorary position, observing that most members had opted for passivism, retreating from involvement in provincial affairs.

After Șaguna's death in 1873, Popea was considered a popular candidate to succeed him, but enemies of the late metropolitan and his protege, led by Vincențiu Babeș, mounted a press campaign that led the latter to withdraw from consideration. The new metropolitan, Prokopije Ivačković, spent less than a year in office, forcing a new election. Popea ran this time, losing to Ioan Popasu. However, as Popasu was not accepted by the authorities, another election was called. This time, Babeș was joined by Ioan Mețianu, Ioan Hannia and other members of the anti-Șaguna faction in mounting opposition to Popea, who lost to Miron Romanul. During the periods when the see was vacant, vicar Popea was in charge, and after Miron's rise, he continued to be very influential, drawing support from professors at the institute (many of them former students of his), and laymen such as Eugen Brote, Ioan Pușcariu and newspaperman Ioan Slavici. This oppositional faction sought to uphold Șaguna's program of national development by safeguarding the church's autonomy, fostering education and ensuring good administration and merit-based promotion within the archdiocese. It was only after about a decade that Miron was able to gain the upper hand within the synod.

Popasu died in February 1889, creating a unique opportunity for Miron to rid himself of his troublesome deputy. Thus, in April, the synod elected Popea as the next Bishop of Caransebeș. The following month, after Miron lobbied the authorities, Emperor Franz Joseph approved the choice. Miron and Mețianu, the Bishop of Arad, consecrated Popea at Sibiu in June, and in July he was enthroned at Caransebeș. As bishop, he fostered the growth of the local theological institute, founded by Popasu. He provided for a new building, and sent several young men to Czernowitz and other universities, then naming them professors. Together with other hierarchs, both Orthodox and Greek-Catholic, he called for the Romanian character of the confessional schools to be preserved; this was in danger from a series of laws approved by the Diet of Hungary. He supervised the diocesan press, including its newsletter Foaia Diecezană, started by Popasu.

=== Historical writings and legacy ===
Popea published several articles on history and speeches in Foaia and in Telegraful Român, as well as in the Vienna-based Die Zukunft, Wanderer and Ost und West. He worked to reprint liturgical books and school texts, including those for the institute. In 1885, he revised and republished Șaguna's manual of canon law. His first book of history was Vechea Mitropolie ortodoxă română a Transilvaniei, suprimarea și restaurarea ei, which began appearing in serial form in 1868 before being published in 1870. The introductory portion, dealing with the origins of the ancient metropolis of Transylvania, is obsolete today. The author then moves on to criticize the founding of the Greek-Catholic Church before discussing the restored metropolis, including a series of acts and documents that remain relevant. The book received criticism from Greek-Catholic scholar Ioan Micu Moldovan, to whom Popea responded with a counterattack. In 1873, the year of Șaguna's death, Popea became his first biographer, publishing a sketch that appeared first in the pages of Telegraful Român and then as a 34-page brochure. A full-length biography followed in 1879, and a decade later, Popea published a book about the metropolitan's political struggles.

In September 1877, as recognition for his writings on history, Popea was elected an honorary member of the Romanian Academy, an institution based in the neighboring Romanian Old Kingdom. He was raised to titular status in April 1899. Following Melchisedec Ștefănescu, he thus became the second bishop to join the Academy as a full member. Popea delivered his reception speech in 1900 before the members, with King Carol I and Prince Ferdinand in attendance. This too dealt with Șaguna, and was published later that year, running to 42 pages.

Popea's final years were marked by illness. He also suffered due to the Magyarization policy promoted by Education Minister Albert Apponyi and the forceful intervention of the authorities in the affairs of the theological institute. In 1908, shortly before the bishop's death, the government fired four professors, among them Ilie Minea and Enea Hodoș, for their political activity. Popea was buried in the cemetery of Caransebeș' Saint John the Baptist Church; an appreciative obituary from Nicolae Iorga followed. He willed his entire estate of 300,000 korona to the diocese, in order to fund scholarships for young Romanian students.
