= Rubin Patiția =

Rubin Patiția (August 21 [O.S. August 9] 1841–June 13, 1918) was an Austro-Hungarian ethnic Romanian lawyer and political activist. A native of the Transylvania region, he trained as a lawyer, settling in Alba Iulia in the 1870s and using his position to advance the local Romanian community. Patiția achieved prominence as a signatory of the Transylvanian Memorandum in 1892, an act that eventually led Patiția to spend time in prison. Soon after 1900, he began to withdraw from politics, dying near the close of World War I, shortly before the union of Transylvania with Romania.

== Biography ==
=== Origins and education ===
Born in Câmpeni, Alba County, in the Țara Moților region of Transylvania, Patiția's father Ioan was a Romanian Orthodox priest, and his younger sister went on to marry a priest. In the spring of 1848, in the family home, Patiția met Avram Iancu, who had arrived to discuss participation by the moți in the upcoming Blaj Assembly. The ensuing Transylvanian Revolution of 1848 deeply marked Patiția's development.

Patiția attended primary school in Neagra, the Transylvanian Saxon school in Sibiu for three grades, the Romanian gymnasium in Beiuș and the Lutheran gymnasium in Sibiu (with instruction in German), and a final year of gymnasium in Beiuș, where he perfected his Romanian. He took the graduating examination in 1862. In September 1852, Patiția again met Iancu, imprisoned in Alba Iulia. In 1866, he graduated from Sibiu's Saxon law academy.

Metropolitan Andrei Șaguna refused to grant Patiția a scholarship for the University of Vienna. As a result, he became a lawyer's apprentice at the appeals court in Târgu Mureș. In 1866, Patiția took a job as deputy clerk at the court in Abrud, later rising to clerk. In 1872, his contract was not renewed, possibly because Romanian rivals accused him of anti-Hungarian agitation. The same year, he was hired as a magistrate's assistant in Alba Iulia; while there, Patiția led a strident effort to maintain Romanian as one of the office's languages, which drew the ire of the mayor, a Magyarized Slovak. These unfavorable conditions, coupled with the Magyarization efforts undertaken by the Kálmán Tisza government beginning in 1875, prompted Patiția to enter private practice in 1878. He sought to defend Romanian peasants, declining to take up lawsuits that "kikes and usurers" brought against them.

Patiția married Ana Rațiu (1850–1918) in 1870. Her father was a priest in Alba Iulia, and Patiția moved into his in-laws' home. The couple had two sons (later a military officer and a jurist, respectively) and a daughter; the latter married Zaharia Munteanu, himself a lawyer and participant in the national movement of Romania's Transylvanians.

=== Political involvement ===
Patiția played an important role in the 1870 foundation of an Astra chapter for Alba Iulia. He became its secretary in 1872 and a life member in 1887. The organization held annual conventions, where he would speak about the importance of education. The city's residents chose him as a delegate to the national conference of Romanian electors, held at Sibiu in 1881. Patiția was also sent to the second such conference, which took place in 1884 and discussed the program of political passivism adopted by Transylvania's Romanians. In 1887, he founded a public library in the building of Alba Iulia's Orthodox school; to Patiția's disappointment, it was later shut down by Nicolae Ivan.

Determined to mark the February 1885 centenary since Horea, Cloșca and Crișan died, Patiția paid a hotel band to play Romanian patriotic songs one evening. The following morning, in spite of a telegraphed order from Metropolitan Miron Romanul to his priests barring them from holding liturgies and thus ensuring no demonstrations would occur, Patiția arrived in church intending to hold a memorial service. Learning there would be no service, he sent word to the priest that he would ring the bells continuously, which would summon a crowd. The latter relented, and although only one bell was rung, many still showed up. From that point, the authorities considered Patiția a dangerous agitator and placed him under surveillance. In September, he was sent to prison for six weeks: three copies of the novel Horia, published in the Romanian city of Iași by Ioan Pop-Florantin, were found during a search of his home, and it was determined he had distributed a further seventeen copies.

Patiția took part in the Transylvanian Memorandum movement and was a strong supporter of sending the document immediately to Emperor Francis Joseph. In mid-1892, he accompanied a delegation to Vienna with the purpose of submitting the petition to the emperor, who refused to receive it; Patiția's writing on the episode is an important first-hand account. Patiția was a member of the executive committee of the Romanian National Party (PNR) from 1892 to 1905. As such, he was indicted and interrogated in May 1893, and tried and sentenced at Cluj a year later for his participation in the process. Patiția was held at Vác prison until September 1895, an experience he amply documented in writing. While there, he was visited by his younger son, then a student at Budapest University.

After being released, Patiția continued as a lawyer and defender of those charged with "agitation", including the founders of a choir that performed Romanian patriotic music. Official harassment continued: he was charged with violence against state authorities but acquitted. However, his signing of a manifesto led to an eight-day prison sentence, carried out at Alba Iulia in September 1896. A supporter of PNR president Ioan Rațiu and of the outspoken newspaper Tribuna, he criticized the Magyarization policy of the Dezső Bánffy government. After Rațiu's death in 1902 and the PNR's shift toward an activist stance, which became party policy in 1905, the aging Patiția gradually withdrew from politics.

In 1906, with the occasion of the jubilee exhibition held at Bucharest in honor of King Carol I, he fulfilled a longstanding wish to visit the Romanian Old Kingdom. During the trip, Patiția went to Constanța and saw the Black Sea. In 1911, he was at Blaj for the 50th-anniversary celebrations of Astra. Patiția authored a manuscript, around a thousand pages in length and kept at the National Museum of the Union. Autobiographical and historical in character, it deals with the events he experienced and the people he met over the course of his life.

Patiția died and was buried at Alba Iulia less than six months before the union of Transylvania with Romania was proclaimed there. His home, which was inherited by his son-in-law Munteanu, is listed as a historic monument by Romania's Ministry of Culture and Religious Affairs.
