= Moise Fulea =

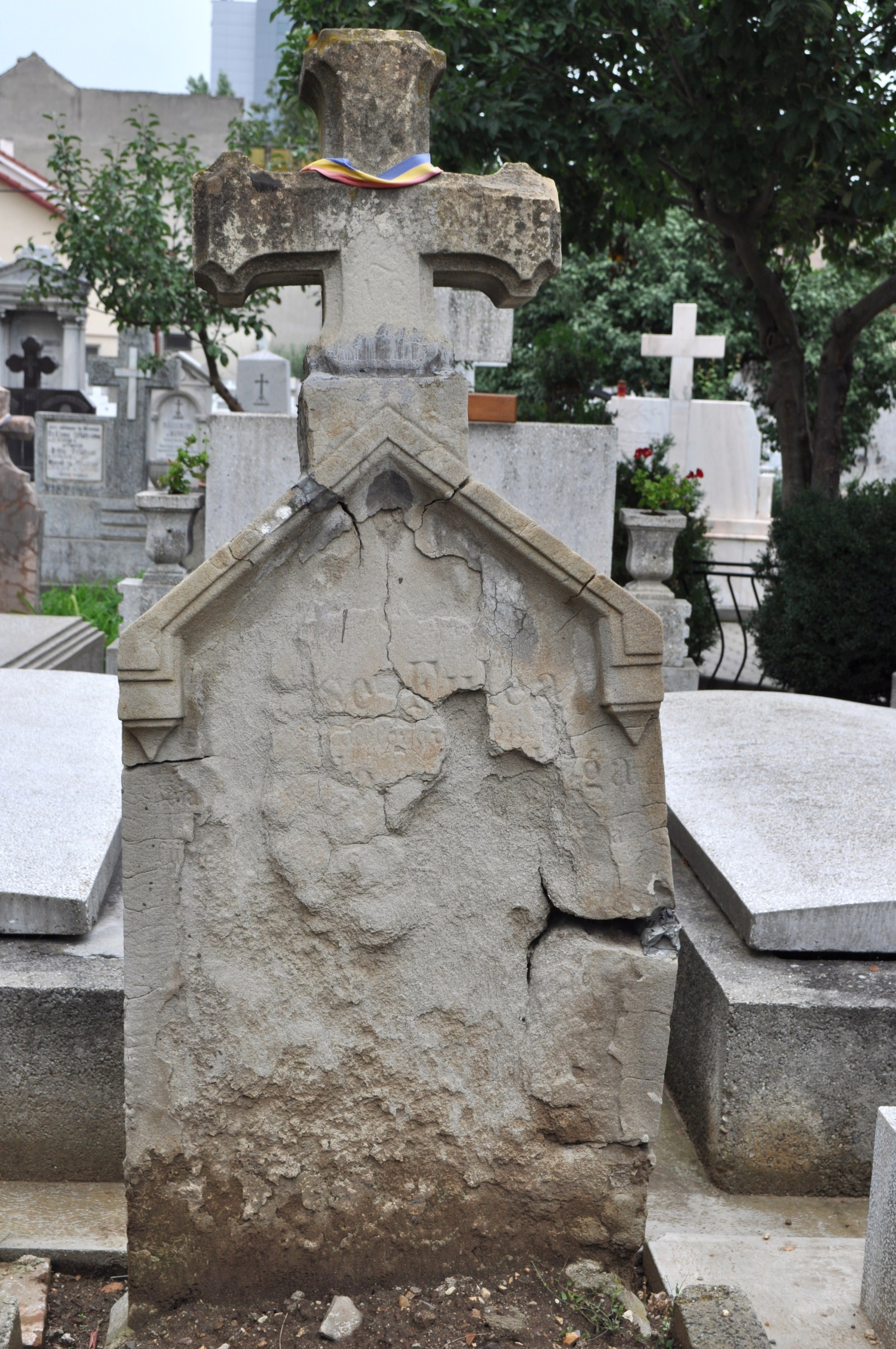
Tombstone of Moise Fulea's grave in the cemetery of Annunciation Church, Sibiu

Moise Fulea (born c. 1787 - died 14/26 November 1863) was a Romanian educator and translator born in Ludoș, Habsurg Empire. In 1814 became the head of Directio Scholarum Non Unitarum Transilvaniensium - the schools of the "non-united" church in Transylvania - until 1849, a position that he receive with the help of his uncle, bishop Vasile Moga, at the expense of Gheorghe Lazăr.

He translated pedagogic texts such as:

- Bucoavna sau cărticica de nume pentru trebuința pruncilor românești neuniți din Ardeal, 1815
- Cărticica năravurilor bune pentru folosul si trebuința tinerimei, de pe nemție in românește întoarsa, 1819
