= Septimiu =

Septimiu is a Romanian male given name that may refer to:

- Septimiu Albini (1861–1919), journalist and political activist
- Septimiu Câmpeanu (born 1957), Romanian football striker
- Septimiu Călin Albuț (born 1981), Romanian football goalkeeper
- Septimiu Turcas, mayor of Șimleu Silvaniei
