= George Bariț =

Ethnic Romanian Austro-Hungarian historian, politician, businessman and journalist

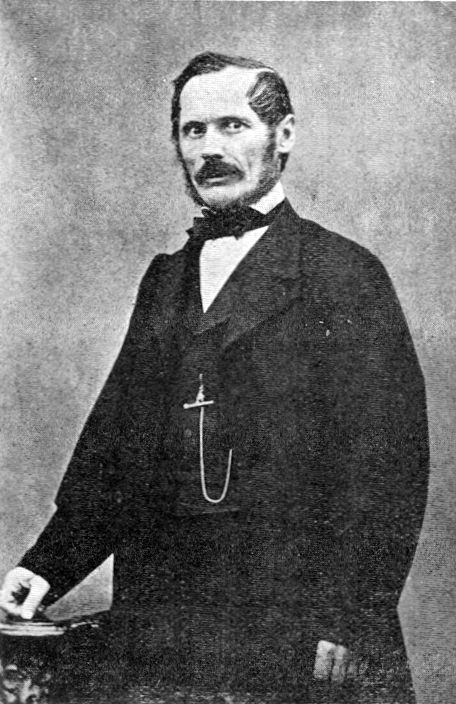
George Bariț

George Bariț (often rendered as George Barițiu, Hungarian: Báricz György; 4 June 1812 – 2 May 1893) was an ethnic Romanian Austro-Hungarian historian, philologist, playwright, politician, businessman and journalist, the founder of the Romanian language press in Transylvania.

== Biography ==
Born in Jucu de Jos, Kolozs County, Principality of Transylvania (today part of Jucu, Cluj County, Romania), he was the son of the Greek-Catholic priest Ioan Pop Bariț, and of Ana Rafila. He attended school in Trascău (today Rimetea, Alba County), and then high school in Blaj and Cluj. Originally trained for priesthood, he decided instead to become a teacher at the Romanian language commercial school in Brașov.

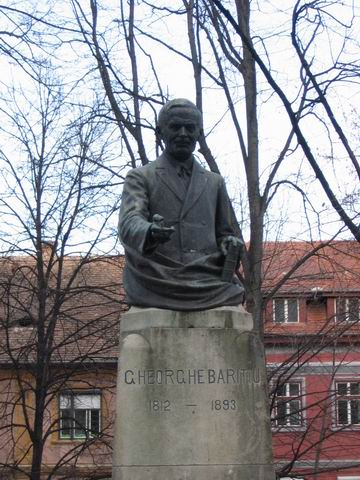
Bariț's statue in front of the ASTRA Palace in Sibiu

In 1838 he founded in Brașov the first Romanian newspaper in his native region, and named it Gazeta de Transilvania and its supplement "Foaie pentru inimă și minte" (Paper for the Mind, Heart, and Literature) at the request of publisher Johann Göt. Politically active, he was an important personality in the revolution of 1848 in Transylvania, establishing connections with Romanian nationalists and radicals in Wallachia and Moldavia, and using Gazeta as one of the main political voices demanding equal rights for Romanians and Hungarians after the Hungarian revolutionary government began pressing for Transylvania to be removed from direct Austrian supervision to be reunited with Hungary.

After the revolutionary episode, in the period between the creation of an Austrian military government for the region and the Ausgleich, Bariț returned to cultural and business activities. In 1861, alongside Andrei Șaguna, Timotei Cipariu, he founded Asociația Transilvană pentru Literatura Română și Cultura Poporului Român (ASTRA). He was its first secretary, and subsequently became its president.

Between 1852 and 1872 Bariţ was the Commercial Director of one of the first manufacturing companies in Transylvania with Romanian private capital, the Fabrica de hârtie din Zărnești (Pulp and paper factory in Zărnești, located west of Brașov in central Romania). During the 1870s he also acted as an adviser to the Founder and the Board of Administration of the Banca Albina, the first bank with private Romanian capital in Transylvania.

As a result of the first free elections in Transylvania in the spring of 1863, following Austria's introduction by imperial decree of representative democracy in its territory in 1861, Bariț became a Member of Parliament in the Dieta Transilvaniei (Transylvanian Parliament) where the ethnic Romanians formed the majority. After 1863, he participated as one of the twenty-six official parliamentary delegates of the Transylvanian Parliament in the second (1863–1864) and third (1864–1865) parliamentary sessions of the central Austrian Parliament (Reichsrat, now National Council of Austria) in Vienna. There, as a full Member of Parliament, a full Member of the Finance Committee and a full Member of the Committee for the Transylvanian Railway, he held several speeches on the imperial financial and trade policies, on foreign policy, on central policies of the government in Vienna towards the Romanian Church United with Rome, and promoted reforms of public finance in Transylvania, as well as specific local interests of Transylvania within the Austrian empire. After mid-1865 he did not continue to go to other sessions of the central Parliament in Vienna, since the political effects of the Ausgleich moved Transylvanian central representation from Vienna to Budapest.

In December 1866, following the beginnings of the Ausgleich, Bariţ initiated and drafted together with Ioan Rațiu (1828–1902), the first Memorandum of the Romanians of Transylvania, addressed directly to emperor Franz Josef I of Austria and signed by 1,493 Transylvanian intellectuals, asking for the maintenance of the administrative and political autonomy of Transylvania within the Austrian empire and within Austrian supervision. This Memorandum was submitted to the emperor in December 1866 and is a precursor of a second memorandum, the Transylvanian Memorandum, submitted in 1892.

Between 1884 and 1888, Bariț served as president of the Romanian National Party in Transylvania and Banat.

When ASTRA began publishing the review Transilvania, Bariț was the main person involved in its editorial ventures, and became one of the authors of the very first Romanian-language Encyclopaedia (published in Sibiu) after his death, between 1898 and 1904. His main personal work, published between 1889 and 1891, was Părți alese din Istoria Transilvaniei pre două sute de ani în urmă ("Selected Episodes of the Past Two Hundred Years in Transylvania's History").

Bariț was a founding member of the Societatea Literară Română (1866), a precursor to the Romanian Academy. Of the latter he was elected in 1868 its head of the historical section, its vice-president in 1876 and its president in 1893. He died in Sibiu a couple of months after his election and is buried in the graveyard of the "Biserica dintre Brazi" church in the city, along with other major Romanian Transylvanian leaders.

== Works ==
- Cuvântare scolasticească la ecsamenul de vară în Școala românească din Brașov și Cetate, 1837
- Deutsch-Rumänisches Wörterbuch, Dicţionariu român-german, 1853–1854
- Dicționariu românesc-unguresc, Magyar-román szótar, 1869
- Părți alese din istoria Transilvaniei pre două sute de ani în urmă, I-III, Sibiu, 1889–1891
- Două drame familiare, drama, 1891
