= Pușcariu =

Pușcariu, meaning "artilleryman", is a Romanian-language surname, and may refer to several members of the same family:

- Emil Pușcariu (1859-1928), physician, son of Ioan
- Ilarion Pușcariu (1842-1922), theologian and Orthodox bishop, brother of Ioan
- Ioan Pușcariu (1824-1911), writer
- Sextil Pușcariu (1877-1948), linguist, nephew of Ilarion and Ioan
