= Gheorghe Lazăr National College (Sibiu) =

Coordinates: 44°26′6.18″N 26°5′25.23″E

Location
- 1-3 Gheorghe Lazăr Street; Sibiu, Transylvania, Romania

Information
- Type: Nationalized: Catholic until 1862
- Established: 1692; 334 years ago
- Gender: Coeducational
- Affiliation: Jesuit: 1692-1773
- Website: CNGL.edu
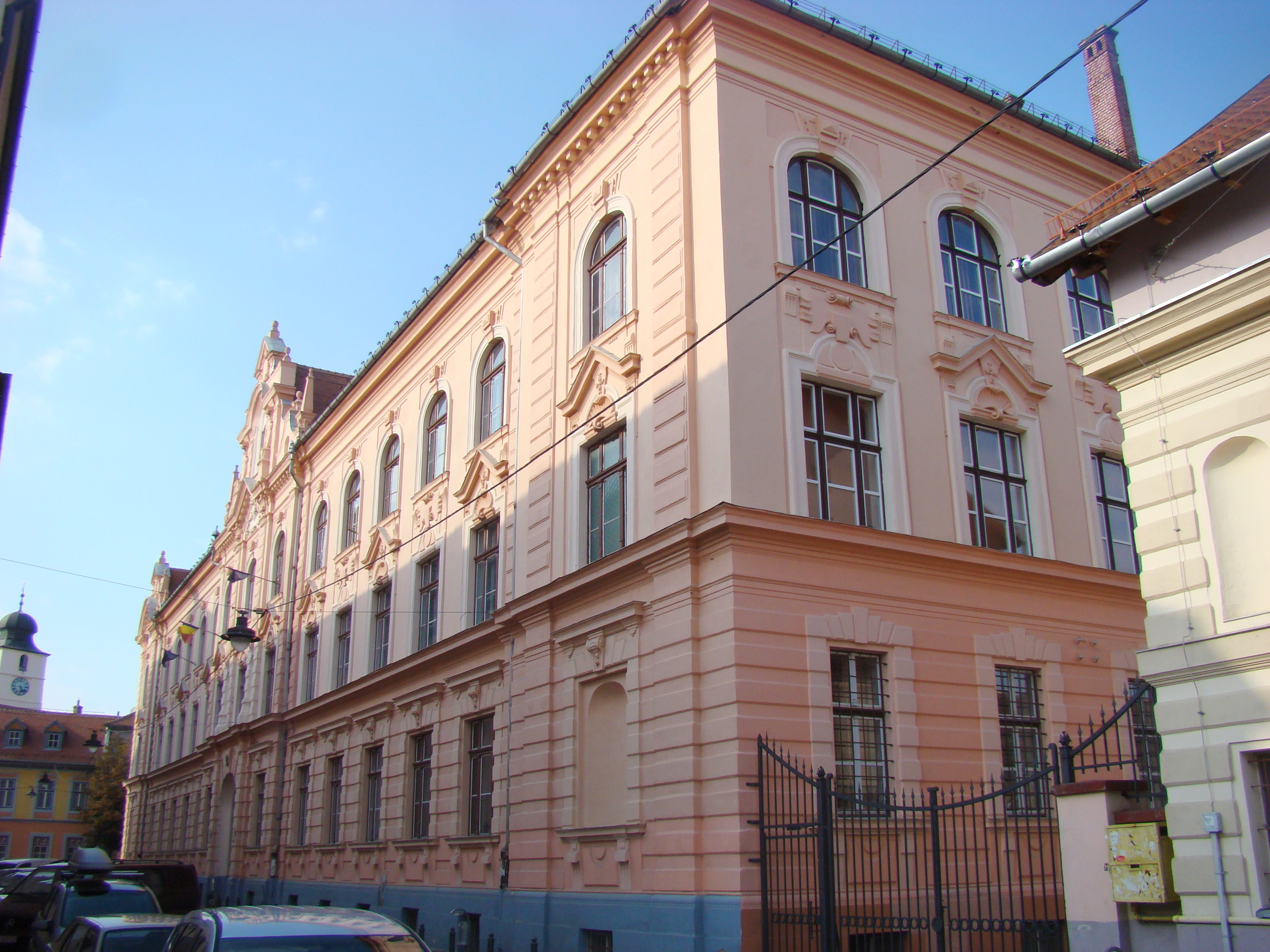

Gheorghe Lazăr National College (Romanian: Colegiul Național "Gheorghe Lazăr") is a public day high school in Sibiu, in the Transylvania region of Romania, located at 1-3 Gheorghe Lazăr Street.

== History ==
=== Latin and German periods ===
The school was founded by the Jesuits in 1692 as a Catholic gymnasium, and Latin was the language of instruction. It was initially located in a small old building near a pharmacy on the Great Square, on the site of the present City Hall. In 1753, it moved to the upper story of a house located at the corner of what are now Mitropoliei and Samuel von Brukenthal streets. In 1773, when the Jesuits were suppressed, the school closed its doors. It reopened in 1780, when Emperor Joseph II approved its reorganization under the name Gymnasium regium Cibiniensis (Royal Sibiu Gymnasium). The administration was composed of local Roman Catholic chaplains; the teachers were Catholic priests, who continued to offer instruction in Latin. In 1789, the school moved into the former Jesuit residence in the Great Square, adjacent to the Jesuit Church; it would remain there until 1898. The Latin period was to the benefit of local Romanian students, who comprised around a third of the student body. Among those who attended were Gheorghe Lazăr (1801-1802), August Treboniu Laurian (1827-1828), Ioan Axente Sever (1835-1840) and Simion Balint.

Change came to the school as a result of the 1848-1849 Revolution, which prompted Education Minister Count von Thun to reorganize the gymnasiums of Transylvania in December 1849. The period of study was lengthened to eight years. In 1850, German was adopted as the main language of instruction, while Romanian was taught for the first time. In 1853, the school became a state institution under the name k. k. kath. Staatsgymnasium in Hermannstadt (Imperial and Royal Catholic State Gymnasium in Sibiu), while maintaining its Roman Catholic character. However, its religious affiliation was dropped in 1862. Students during the mid-19th century included Ioan Brote (1832-1835), Iacob Bologa (1835-1840), Ilie Măcelariu (1837-1842), Nicolae Cristea (1848-1857), Visarion Roman (1849-1850), Dimitrie Cunțan (1854-1858), Eugen Brote (1868), Aaron Florian, Ioan Pușcariu, Ioan Popescu, and Sava Popovici Barcianu. Although there is no proof, it is believed that in 1864, Mihai Eminescu took his third-year gymnasium examinations here.

=== Hungarian and Romanian periods ===
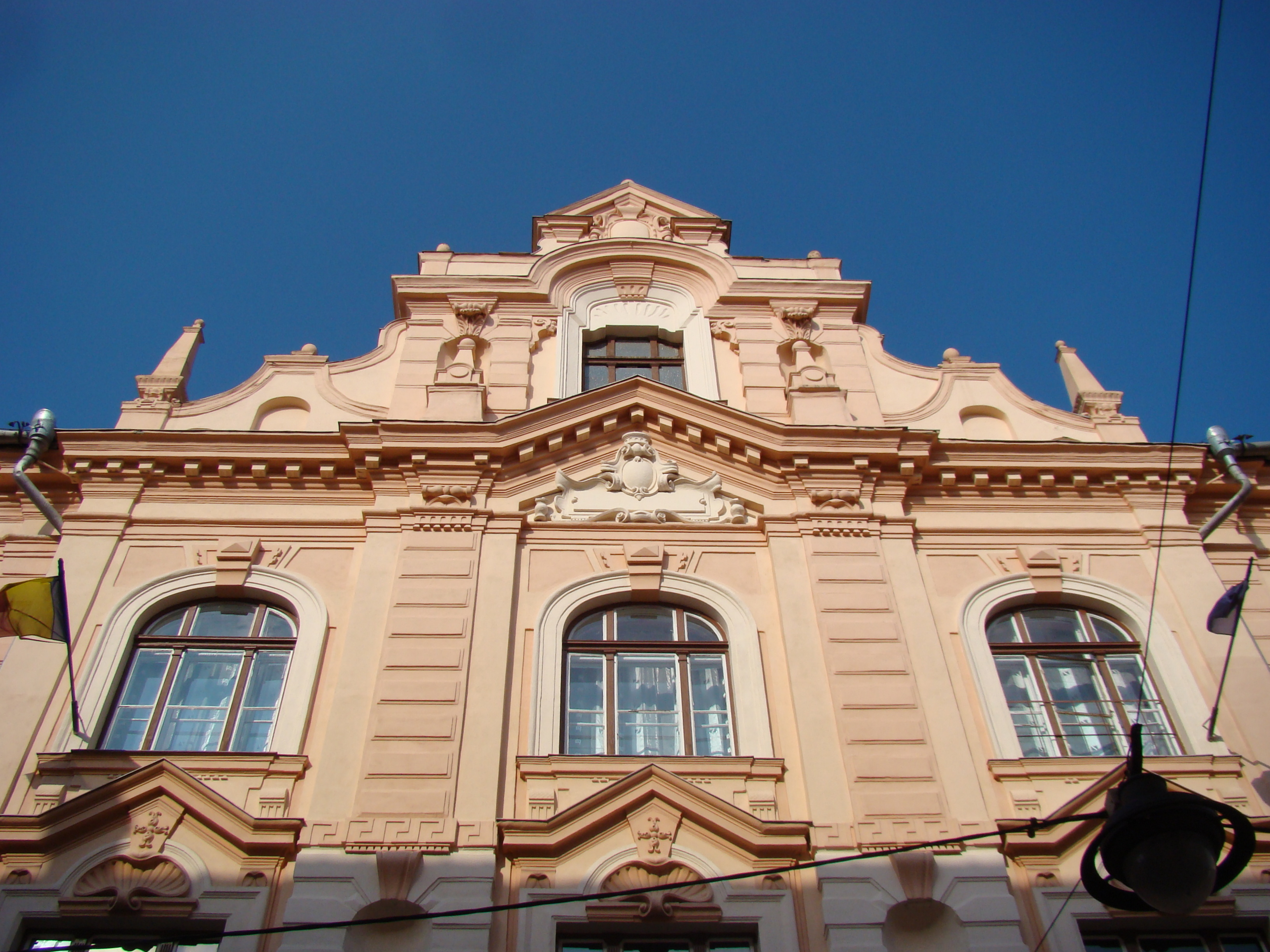

Following the Austro-Hungarian Compromise and starting with the 1868-1869 school year, Hungarian became the language of instruction; it would remain so until 1918-1919. However, the majority of the students were Romanian. In 1868, of 389 pupils, 222 were Romanian, 107 German, 55 Hungarian, one Jewish and four of other ethnicities. Those who studied there during this period included Ioan Alexandru Lapedatu (1868), Octavian Smigelschi (1884), Ilie Beu (1884), Ștefan Octavian Iosif (1891), Octavian Goga (until 1899), Onisifor Ghibu (until 1900), Aurel Vlaicu (1902), Ioan Lupaș, Valeriu Braniște, Axente Banciu, Andrei Oțetea, Aurel Moga, Nicolae Ivan, Ștefan Cicio-Pop and Ilarion Pușcariu. The school building inaugurated in 1898 remains in use today.

In 1898 the school moved into the new building which it occupies today. In 1919, following the union of Transylvania with Romania, the language of instruction became Romanian. The school came under the educational legislation of the former Romanian Old Kingdom, receiving the name Gheorghe Lazăr High School. The grade structure was overhauled in 1948 by the new communist regime and again in 1965. In 1992, for its 300th anniversary, the school was named a college, and was granted the title of national college in 1999. Among its 20th century attendees were Aurel Bărglăzan (1923), Emil Cioran (1928), Gheorghe Șoima (1928), Nicolae Manolescu (1956), Virgil Vătășianu and Paul Goma, as well as Delia Velculescu. The school includes a gymnasium (grades 5–8) and a high school (grades 9–12), and has over sixty faculty members. There are around 1000 pupils, of whom a quarter attend the former level and the rest are in the upper school.

== Library ==
Lazăr has among the oldest school libraries in Transylvania. Although the date it opened is unknown, it is believed to have been operating in the second half of the 18th century. Evidence for this comes from the large collection of Latin and Greek works in rare 16th-18th century editions. Documents from 1810 to 1837 already mention the need for reorganizing the library. There are some 46,000 books in all; most are freely available to students and teachers, but 13,000 appeared before 1900 and are kept separately.

The latter includes four sections, the first of which contains manuscripts, historic documents related to the political and economic life of Transylvania and correspondence from the 16th and 17th centuries, as well as old religious texts. Among the incunabula are a 1482 edition of Horace's Odes published at Florence. The rare books range from literature to philosophy, history, theology and geography. They are leather-bound, carefully printed, engraved, decorated with vignettes, scenes from antiquity, human profiles and illustrations. Finally, the collection of old Romanian books goes back to 17th-century volumes with wood covers, bound in leather and with traces of locks. These are mainly religious in character, but more secular works appear from the 18th and 19th centuries.

== See also ==
- Catholic Church in Romania
- Education in Romania
- List of Jesuit schools
