= Septimiu Albini =

Imperial Austrian-born Romanian journalist and political activist (1861-1919)

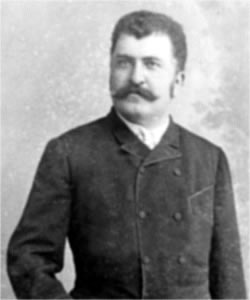
- Born: June 9, 1861
- Died: November 7, 1919 (aged 58)
- Occupations: Journalist and political activist

Septimiu Albini (June 9, 1861 – November 7, 1919) was an Imperial Austrian-born Romanian journalist and political activist. A native of Transylvania, he attended the University of Vienna, where he was active in the local affiliate of Junimea society. Invited by Ioan Slavici, he settled in Sibiu in 1886, where he edited Tribuna newspaper and explored political journalism for the following eight years. The period was marked by several stays in prison for press infractions. His time there came to an abrupt end in 1894, when he was sentenced to prison for having signed the Transylvanian Memorandum. Rather than undergo further incarceration, Albini fled to the Romanian Old Kingdom, where he lived in relative obscurity.

== Biography ==
=== Origins and education ===
Born in Șpring, Alba County, in the Transylvania region, Septimiu Albini was the first of two sons born to Vasile Albini, a former vice-tribune in the legion of Axente Sever during the Transylvanian Revolution of 1848–1849; and to Emilia Neagoe, a niece of Greek-Catholic Metropolitan Alexandru Sterca-Șuluțiu. His father played an important role in Albini's intellectual development, telling stories about the events of 1848. The effort to imbue the son with patriotism began early: when the infant was forty days old, Vasile Albini symbolically dedicated him to Michael the Brave. His childhood was spent in nearby Cut, where the family originated. He attended secondary school at the Romanian high school in Blaj and the German high school in Sibiu, and although this environment exposed him to Latinist principles, he entered into contact with Junimist ideas by reading Convorbiri Literare and soon subscribed to the society's principles. He took part in poetry readings at the home of Visarion Roman, his future father-in-law. He received a degree from Blaj.

Then, from 1879 to 1883, he attended the literature and philosophy faculty of the University of Vienna on a scholarship from Junimea, based in the Romanian Old Kingdom city of Iași. He entered România Jună Society, while there, he advocated for a phonetic spelling of Romanian, following the lead of Titu Maiorescu and standing in opposition to the etymological approach of his former teacher Timotei Cipariu. In later years, he would remember the friendship he developed at Vienna with a fellow Romanian student, Ioan Paul; the two would attend society meetings together and spend much of their free time discussing literature. In 1880, wishing to chart a new course, the society members founded a literary club, "Arborele", with fourteen or seventeen participants. These selected assumed names; Albini was Mugur or "bud", a name with which he also signed literary work. He took part in festive meetings honoring Junimea.

=== Tribuna years ===
After graduating, Albini found himself unwilling to emigrate to the Old Kingdom, like some of his classmates, and instead returned to Cut. In the subsequent period, he spent a good part of his time administering the family property, but also wrote articles and sent them to Tribuna newspaper in Sibiu. In 1886, Ioan Slavici, the director of Tribuna, invited Albini to Sibiu in order to become editor. Not only did the elder man appreciate Albini's writing and attachment to Tribunist principles, he had also decided upon founding the newspaper that a certain number of its staff, invariably including the editor, would be Greek-Catholics. Albini accepted on condition he be allowed to apply for a post for the 1886–1887 school year as teacher at the local Astra girls' school. He embraced the newspaper's cultural views, but was not especially interested in politics at that point. In the summer of 1886, he was hired for the school job, working there until 1888. Hired as principal the previous year, he resigned due to differences with the Astra leadership. While at the school, he taught Romanian language, history and geography of Hungary; the position allowed him to promote emerging ideas and a love for rural Transylvanian values. He was a member of the Romanian National Party, rising to become its secretary, and joining its leadership committee in early 1892. In May 1891, he took part in the first congress of the Cultural League for the Unity of All Romanians.

From 1888 to 1894, Albini was director and editor of Tribuna; the position had become vacant following Slavici's sentencing to a year's imprisonment. In this position, he was deeply involved in cultural affairs, and contributed two rural-themed short stories to the newspaper, "O seară la Brustureni" and "Un sărac avut". Additionally, "Un nou filoromân" is a polemic directed against a book by an obscure Hungarian writer, Sándor Lengyel, that Albini considered defamatory toward the peasants of the Apuseni Mountains. However, he increasingly became enmeshed in political and national matters as well. This side of his activity saw Albini charged in several press trials, leading to his incarceration in Cluj for a month in 1889 and for six months at Vác in 1890–1891. In 1893, just after becoming engaged, he spent three months in the prison at Szeged. As a signer of the Transylvanian Memorandum, he was put on trial. His health weakened following the winter prison stay at Szeged, he could not attend the May 1894 sentencing, and instead waited until October to learn of the two and a half years' sentence. The state of his health, combined with the fact that he was recently married and had a newborn son, and was still a young man, led Albini to flee to Romania and avoid punishment. Another contributing factor was likely the letter of Dimitrie Sturdza, head of Romania's National Liberal Party, urging those sentenced not to accept the verdict and instead continue their struggle out of the Old Kingdom. His "desertion" was strongly condemned by fellow signatories who served their sentences, including by Tribuna colleagues, but Albini justified his action through articles published there.

=== Exile and legacy ===
In Romania, Albini initially experienced a period of material difficulties, eventually finding work as a secretary at the Romanian Academy, remaining there until 1918. He also functioned as a schoolteacher during this period. His actions in Transylvania's Romanian national movement became peripheral, taking the form of occasional press articles or brochures. In 1914, following the outbreak of World War I, he went to Czernowitz as a delegate of the academy, returning with eleven crates of material for Sextil Pușcariu's dictionary of the Romanian language. He left behind eight partly unpublished manuscripts, of which six dealt with politics. These are generally of mediocre value to historians, although his unfinished memoir about the Tribuna period offers valuable first-hand insights about how the newspaper functioned.

Albini married Aurelia Roman in February 1894; the marriage sponsor was Gheorghe Bogdan-Duică. The couple had three sons; the eldest was killed in the Battle of Mărășești. In 1919, following the union of Transylvania with Romania, he returned to his native region for the first time since emigrating, visiting the places where he grew up. Shortly thereafter, he died of pneumonia and was buried at Cut alongside family members. In 1998, Ilie Moise published a collection of Albini's literary and pedagogical writings. Gathering nearly all his work for Tribuna, the first section includes the two short stories, seen as precursors to the prose of Ion Agârbiceanu and Pavel Dan, as well as history, literary criticism and folklore studies. Notable in the latter category is "Din seara de Crăciun", which looks in detail at the practice of Christmas caroling. The second includes his reflections on education, including an insistence on teaching in the Romanian language. A second volume encompassing his Tribuna memoir, a short monograph on the Transilvania society and various political commentaries appeared in 2014. The primary school in Cut is named after Albini and features a medallion with his likeness, while a statue of him stands before the local mayor's office.
