= Vasile Moga =

Imperial Austrian ethnic Romanian bishop

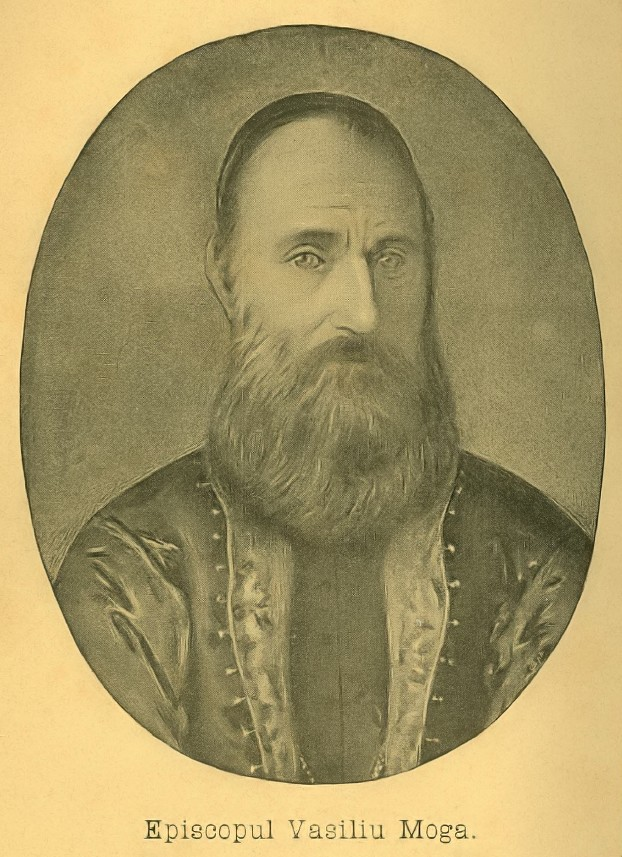
- Church: Metropolitanate of Karlovci
- Diocese: Transylvania
- Installed: 29 June 1811
- Term ended: 17 October 1845
- Predecessor: Gerasim Adamović (d. 1796)
- Successor: Andrei Șaguna (from 1848)

Orders
- Ordination: 1798
- Consecration: 23 April 1811

Personal details
- Born: 1774 Szászsebes, Sebeș Seat, Habsburg monarchy (now Sebeș, Alba County, Romania)
- Died: October 17, 1845 (aged 70–71) Nagyszeben, Austrian Empire (now Sibiu, Romania)
- Buried: Annunciation Church
- Denomination: Eastern Orthodox Church

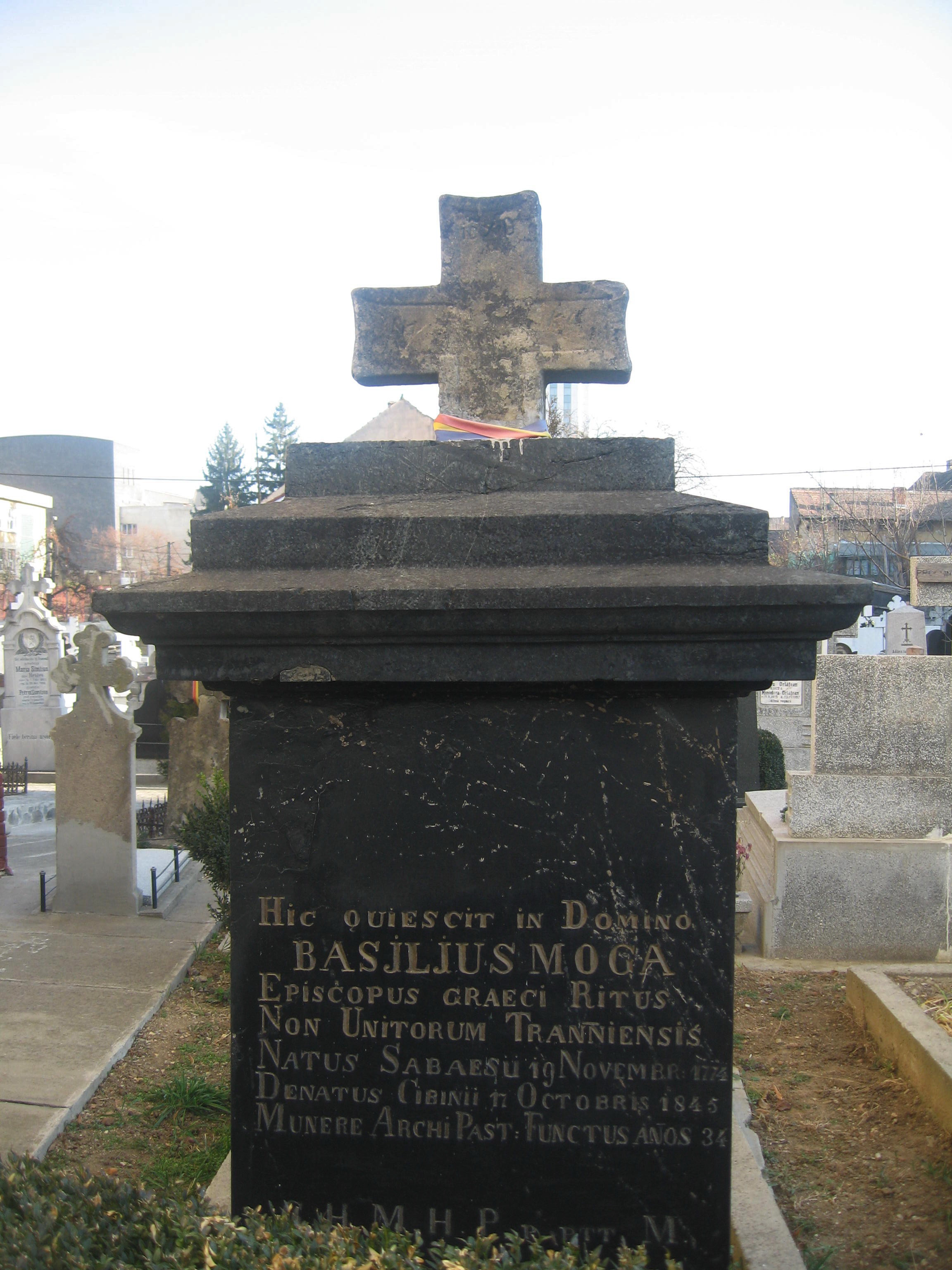
Grave in Sibiu

Vasile Moga (Romanian pronunciation: [vaˈsile ˈmoɡa]; 1774 – October 17, 1845) was an Imperial Austrian ethnic Romanian bishop of the Metropolitanate of Karlovci. A native of Sebeș, he was a parish priest for some years before being made bishop of Transylvania. The first Romanian to hold this office in over a century, he served for over three decades. Living in Sibiu during this period, he worked both to improve the spiritual and educational foundations of the diocese and to secure additional rights for the province's Romanians.

== Biography ==
=== Origins and rise to bishop ===
Born in to an old priestly family in Sebeș, in the Principality of Transylvania, he attended the local Lutheran gymnasium from 1786, followed by the Roman Catholic high schools in Alba Iulia and Cluj. He went to the latter institution for five years, including a study of philosophy during the final two. His father Ioan died in 1798, after which he went to Arad and was ordained a priest without having married. At Sebeș until 1810, he first served alongside his uncle Avram, and then with his brother Zaharia after Avram's death.

There had been no Romanian Orthodox bishop of Transylvania since Atanasie Anghel entered the new Romanian Greek-Catholic Church in 1701, and no bishop of any nationality since a succession of Serbian bishops who reigned beginning in 1761 had ended in 1796. After a series of petitions, in May 1809 the imperial court approved the election of a Romanian bishop by a synod, held at Turda in October 1810. Described by one contemporary as "an unremarkable man, unknown, speaks foreign languages, but is otherwise a lethargic, negligent and weak character", Moga had the backing of the powerful Governor of Transylvania, György Bánffy. He was also supported by Greek-Catholic bishops Ioan Bob and Samuil Vulcan, who preferred a compliant Orthodox leader rather than his more fanatical rival Nicolae Hutovici, a cleric ready to oppose their efforts at attracting converts in southern Transylvania. Thus, although he placed second of three candidates, the Transylvanian authorities recommended Moga over the winner Hutovici, and the Emperor quickly approved the nomination in December.

Tonsured a monk at Krušedol monastery, he was consecrated a bishop at Karlowitz in April 1811. His enthronement took place at Cluj in June, in the presence of Bánffy. Moga soon asked to be transferred to Sibiu; once this request was granted, he moved into a house rented from a Transylvanian Saxon. In August, Moga announced to his clergy that he had been installed, thus beginning his activity. He resided at Sibiu and remained as bishop until his death.

=== Activities as bishop ===
During his 34 years as at the helm of the diocese, Moga confronted difficulties placed in his path by both the imperial and the Transylvanian authorities, by the local Saxons and the Greek-Catholic clergy. Even the decree naming him bishop imposed nineteen restrictions. Reminded that he held office thanks to the Emperor's grace, he was obliged to be his faithful subject and follow all the country's laws. Every month, he had to submit minutes of his consistorial meetings to the government. He and his priests were not allowed to object to the spread of Greek Catholicism or to accept the presence of monks from the Danubian Principalities. The clergy were considered "tolerated" and not permitted to request improvements in their condition, and did not own land like priests from other faiths. The document specified that if Orthodox parishioners embraced Greek Catholicism, the church land would become the property of the latter denomination, while if an entire village took up Orthodoxy, the Greek-Catholic priest would retain control. The general sense of these restrictions was to consolidate the Greek-Catholic Church at the expense of the Orthodox one.

Despite these provisions, Moga managed a number of achievements, both in the ecclesiastical and the cultural-political sphere. He sent tens of pastoral letters to clergy and parishioners. A supporter of primary education, he urged the priests to help build churches and schools. He obliged them to preach, to build schools and to catechize the people. He visited numerous parishes, urging their priests to set up registers for baptisms, marriages and deaths. When disputes among the faithful arose, Moga would intervene promptly, and he would berate and punish priests who did not carry out their duties. He initiated six-month courses in theology and pedagogy in 1811 and granted scholarships for the University of Vienna to the most promising students. He purchased a house that became his official residence, as well as hosting the consistory and seminary, and built a separate wing for the teachers he hired and paid.

One of these was Gheorghe Lazăr, who spent about three years on the faculty before an ongoing conflict with Moga forced him to leave Sibiu in late 1815. The previous year, the bishop had recalled his nephew Moise Fulea from Vienna in order to train priests. In 1816 another nephew, Ioan Moga, also a Vienna returnee, replaced Lazăr. The pair would be the only seminary faculty members at Sibiu for some three decades. Despite misunderstandings with Lazăr, Moga continued to improve education for future priests after 1815. In 1832, he created a scholarship fund worth 10,000 florins and capable of supporting six Orthodox students; he added another 30,000 florins in 1835. He freely gave money to those in need. He published a number of religious books at private printing presses in Sibiu, while sponsoring the printing of textbooks and other materials in the Romanian language, and facilitated the circulation of Petru Maior's works. He also supported cultural events and the distribution of Romanian gazettes and magazines. The money he gave out came entirely from the synodal fund, the church's only source of revenue.

=== Political involvement and legacy ===
Over the course of his episcopate, Moga pushed for the Romanians' recognition as the fourth nation in Transylvania (see Unio Trium Nationum) and for their political and social rights. He went to Vienna in 1812, seeking to improve his priests' conditions and to have his residence fixed at Sibiu. He sent a number of petitions there starting in 1816; these requested land for the priests, their exemption from taxes and government financial assistance. He even hired an agent in Vienna to report on the situation there, but his early initiatives met with limited success. After 1830, the situation became more favorable: conflict between the government and the largely Protestant opposition nobility grew more acute, and both groups attempted to draw the Romanians onto their side. It was in this context that Moga wrote to Greek-Catholic bishop Ioan Lemeni in November 1833, suggesting the two draft a petition. The two sent the resulting document to Vienna in April 1834, taking up the grievances of the earlier Supplex Libellus Valachorum. Although without immediate effect, the episode demonstrated that clerics from the two churches could cooperate in seeking to advance the rights of Romanians.

Moga alone petitioned the Transylvanian Diet in 1837, seeking to obtain certain economic benefits and relief from taxes and tithes for his clergy and faithful on the Saxon-dominated Fundus regius, and again in 1842 to obtain enforcement of a 1791 law recognizing freedom of worship for the Orthodox. Later the same year, he again joined with Lemeni to seek sanctions against the Hungarian and Székely members of the Diet for allegedly discriminating against the Romanian inhabitants of the Fundus regius. The initiative, in which the bishops reminded the privileged nations of the significant inequalities faced by their community, took place against a backdrop of conflict between Hungarians and Saxons regarding the principality's official language. Although Hungarian and Székely deputies showed some interest in embarrassing the Saxons, the petitions were unsuccessful, either relegated to the archives or sent to be forgotten in a study committee.

One of Moga's later actions involved the Orthodox of his native town Sebeș. As far back as 1817, he had asked his brother Zaharia to secure funds from the local treasury for a new church, on the basis that most taxpayers were Romanian. Moga sent petitions to the government and even the Emperor about this matter, but they remained unanswered. Finally, he sued the town hall in 1840, spending considerable sums on the case, but died during the course of the trial. Initially, his nephew Ioan continued to fight in court, but, old and sick, soon lost interest. Upon his death in 1845, Moga was buried in the yard of the Annunciation Church. In his will, the bishop bequeathed to the church assessors his residence and a second house in Sibiu, as well as an orchard; he also left behind an endowment for paying the church's lawyers and other needs. While his eventual successor Andrei Șaguna has been the subject of ample historiographic study, Moga's life has generally been treated in cursory fashion, with the last biography appearing in 1938. One noted study, published in 1915 by Ioan Lupaș, analyzed the dispute between Moga and Lazăr.
