= Annunciation Church, Sibiu =

Heritage site in Sibiu County, Romania

Coordinates: 45.7881°N 24.1463°E

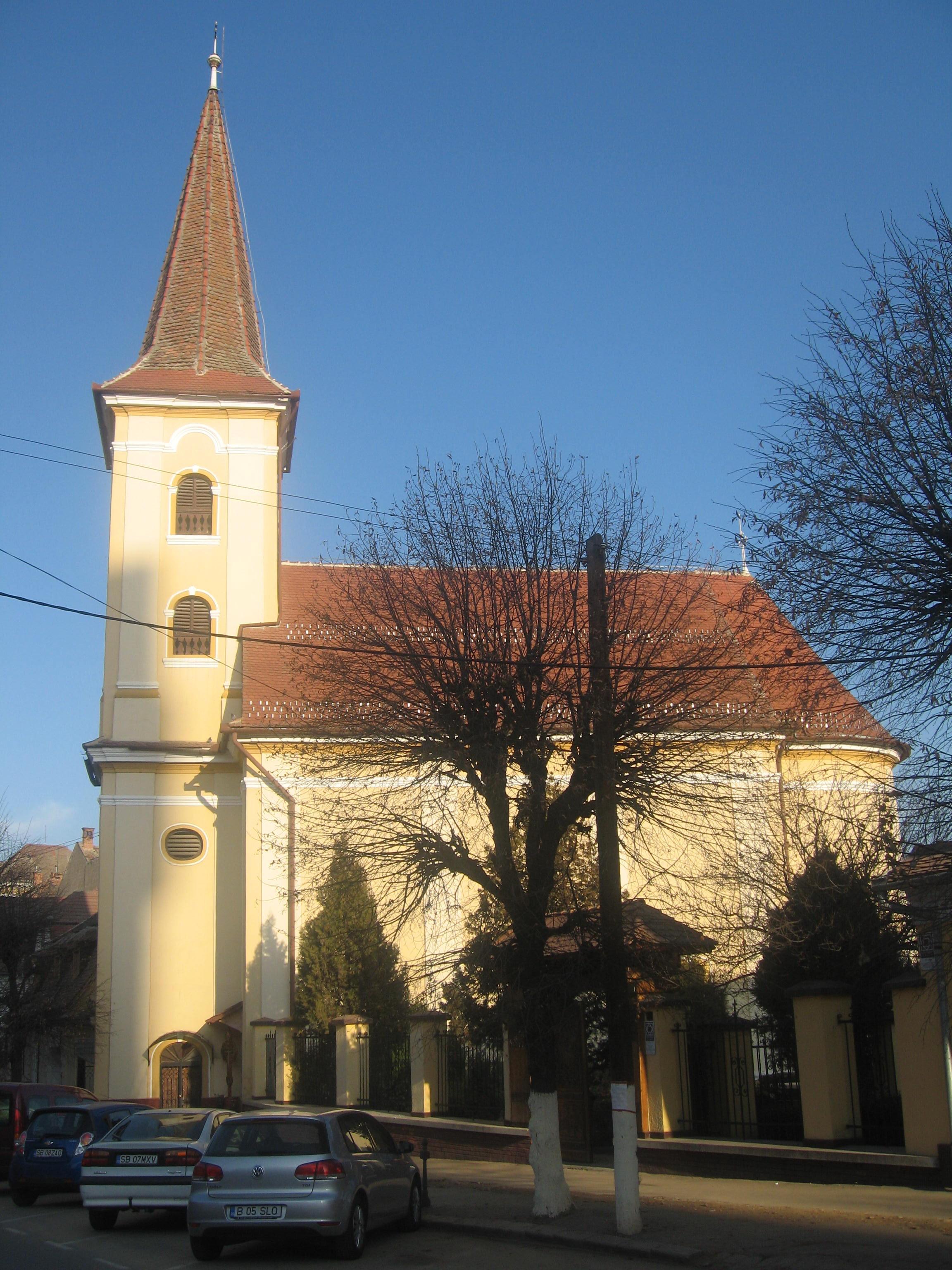
Annunciation Church

The Annunciation Church (Romanian: Biserica Buna Vestire), also known as the Church in the Ditch (Biserica din Groapă), is a Romanian Orthodox church located at 5 Justiției Street in the Transylvanian city of Sibiu.

Initially built between 1788 and 1789 using funds provided by the widow Stana Hagi Petru Luca, it was destroyed by an earthquake in October 1802 and completely rebuilt by her son-in-law Constantin Hagi Popp in 1802-1803. In 1805, the parish had forty families.

The building is a small hall church. The spire, on the western edge, is divided into three stories and reaches a height of 40 m. The iconostasis was painted by Mișu Popp of Brașov. The rich interior mural painting was done after 1960. There are oil paintings of the three ktitors above the entrance door on the interior: Hagi Constantin Popp, Stana Petru Luca and Păuna Constantin Popp. The remains of the three were exhumed in March 1856 and buried under the altar upon the instructions of Bishop Andrei Șaguna.

A number of important 19th-century figures are buried in the cemetery behind the church. The oldest grave, from 1813, holds Meletie, the last parish priest of the local Greek chapel. Notable burials include Ioan Piuariu-Molnar, Vasile Aaron, Vasile Moga, Iosif Hodoșiu, Ion Codru-Drăgușanu, Paul Dunca, Miron Romanul, Zaharia Boiu and Ioan Mețianu. A monument to the nation's heroes was built at the entrance in 2006.

The church is listed as a historic monument by Romania's Ministry of Culture and Religious Affairs. The parish house (built at the end of the 18th century) and the cemetery are given as separate entries, as are four graves: those of Boiu, Codru-Drăgușanu, Moise Fulea and George Manasis.

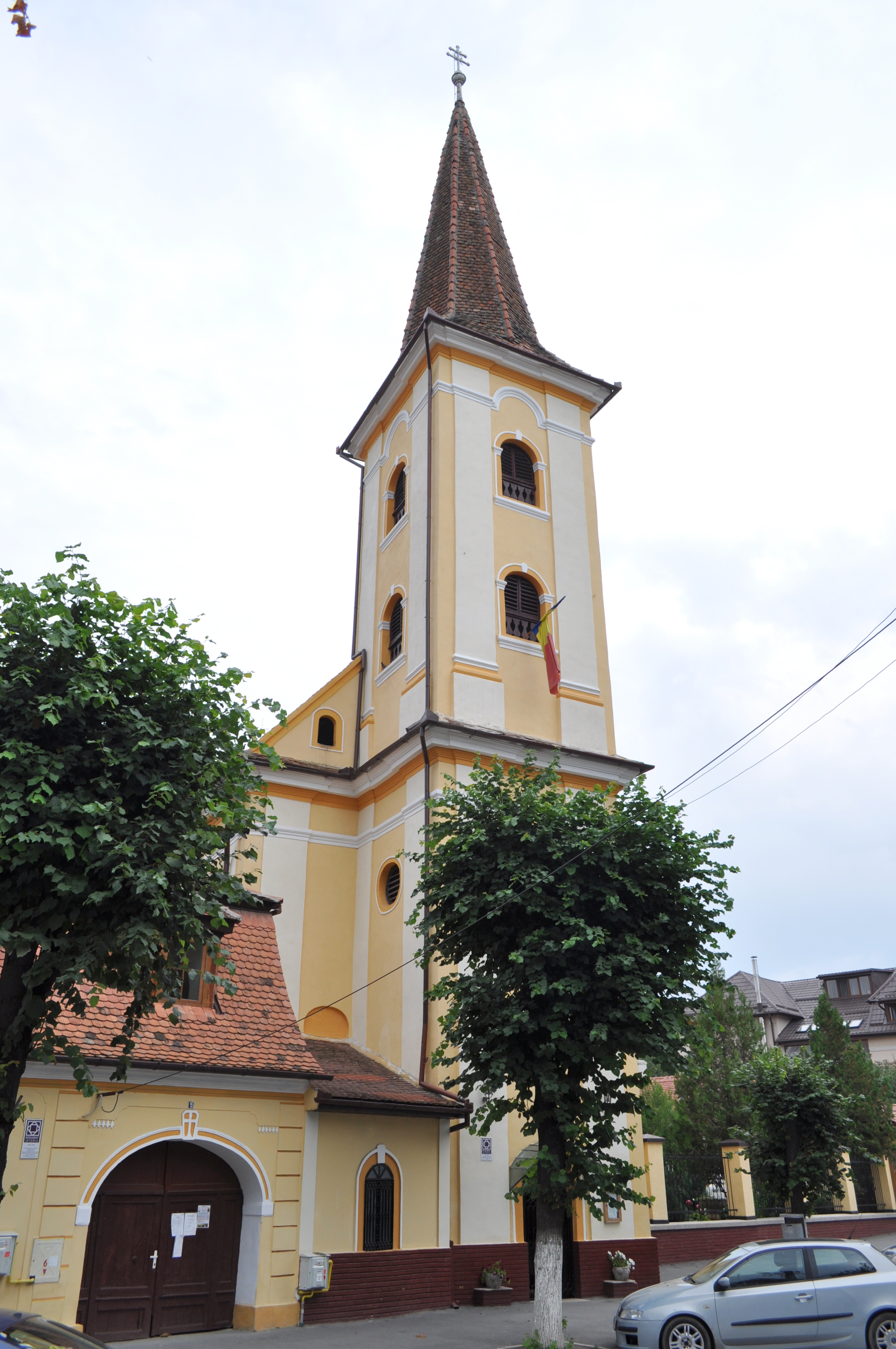
Parish house (left)

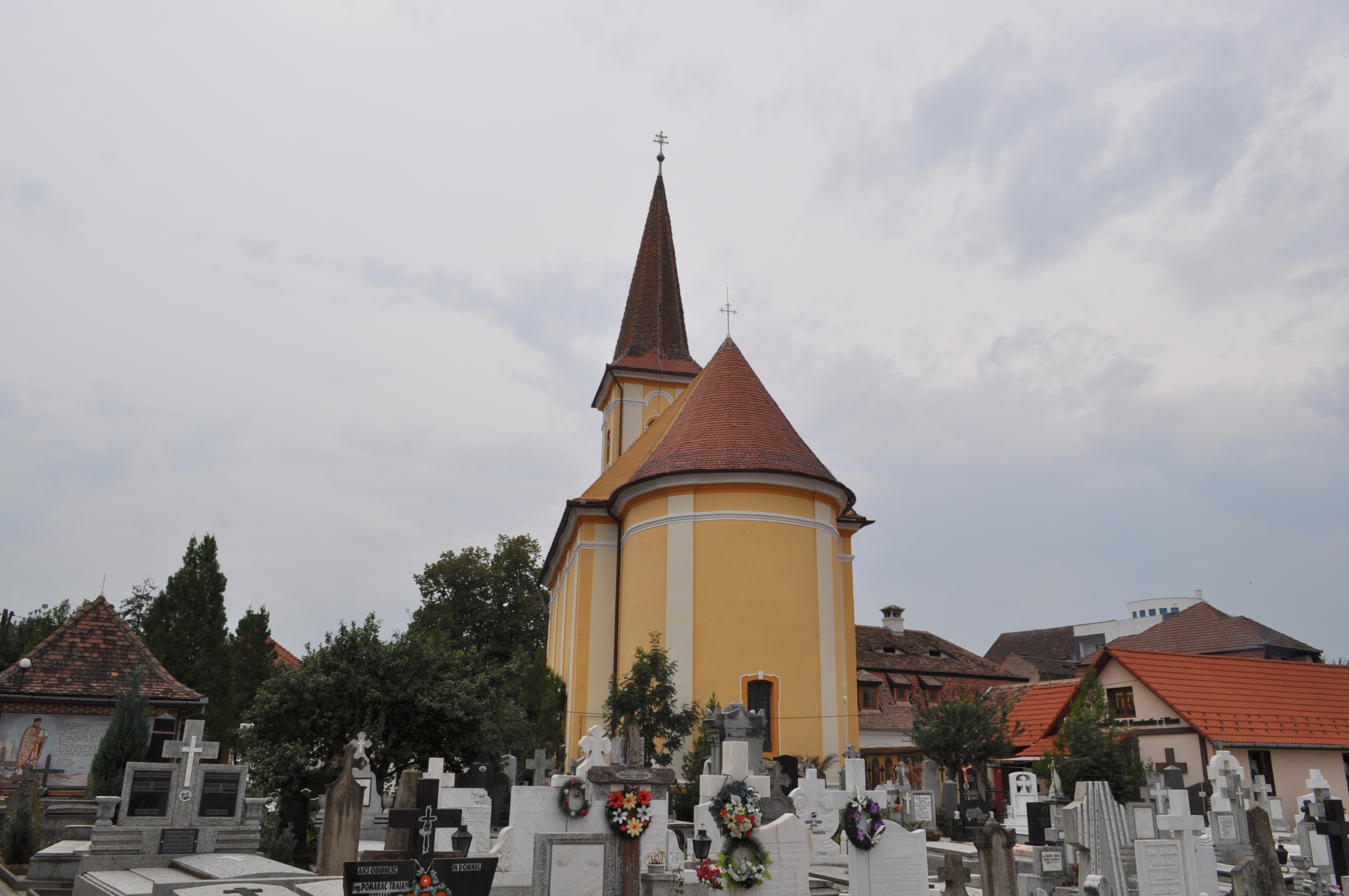
Cemetery

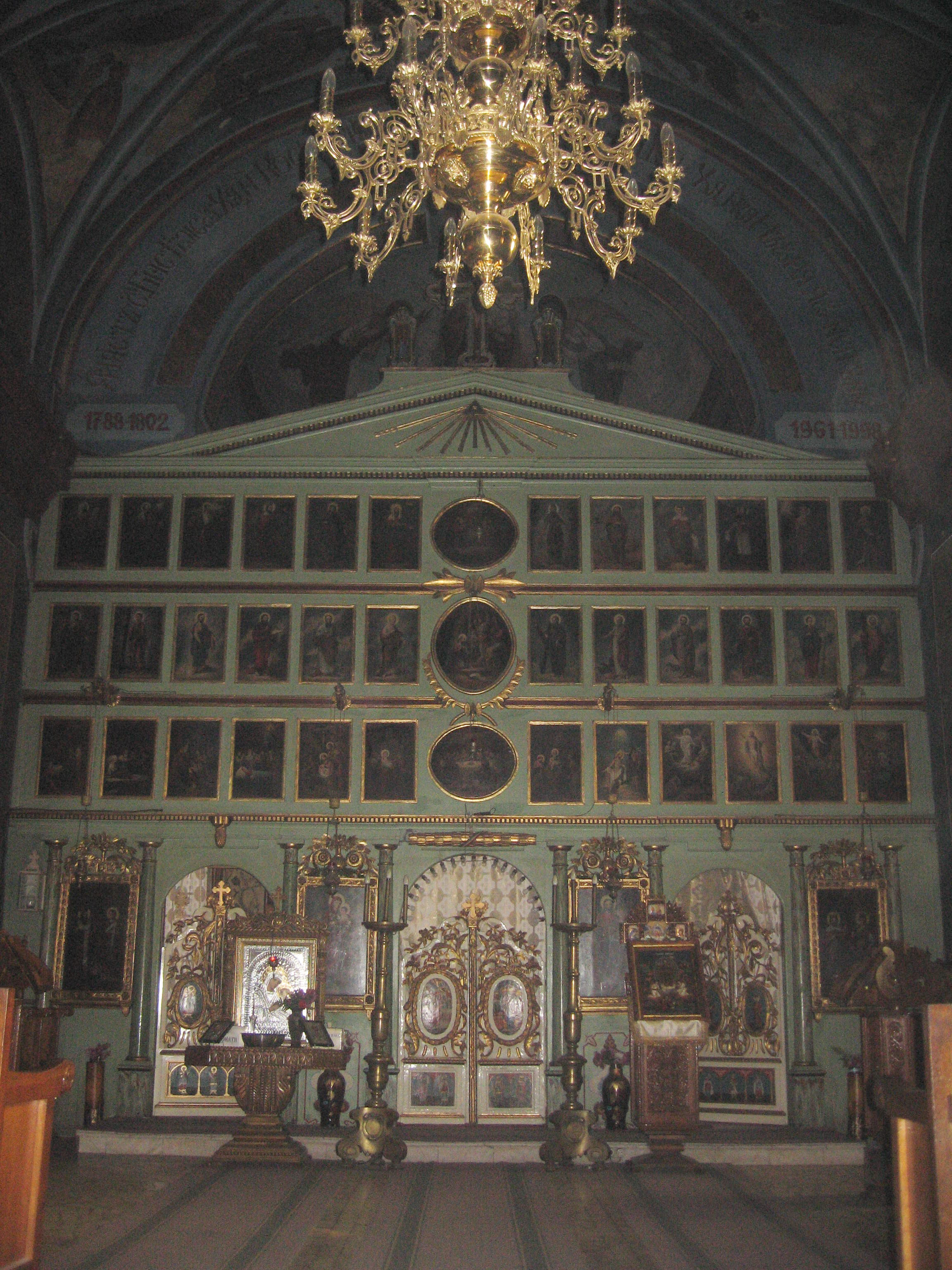
Iconostasis

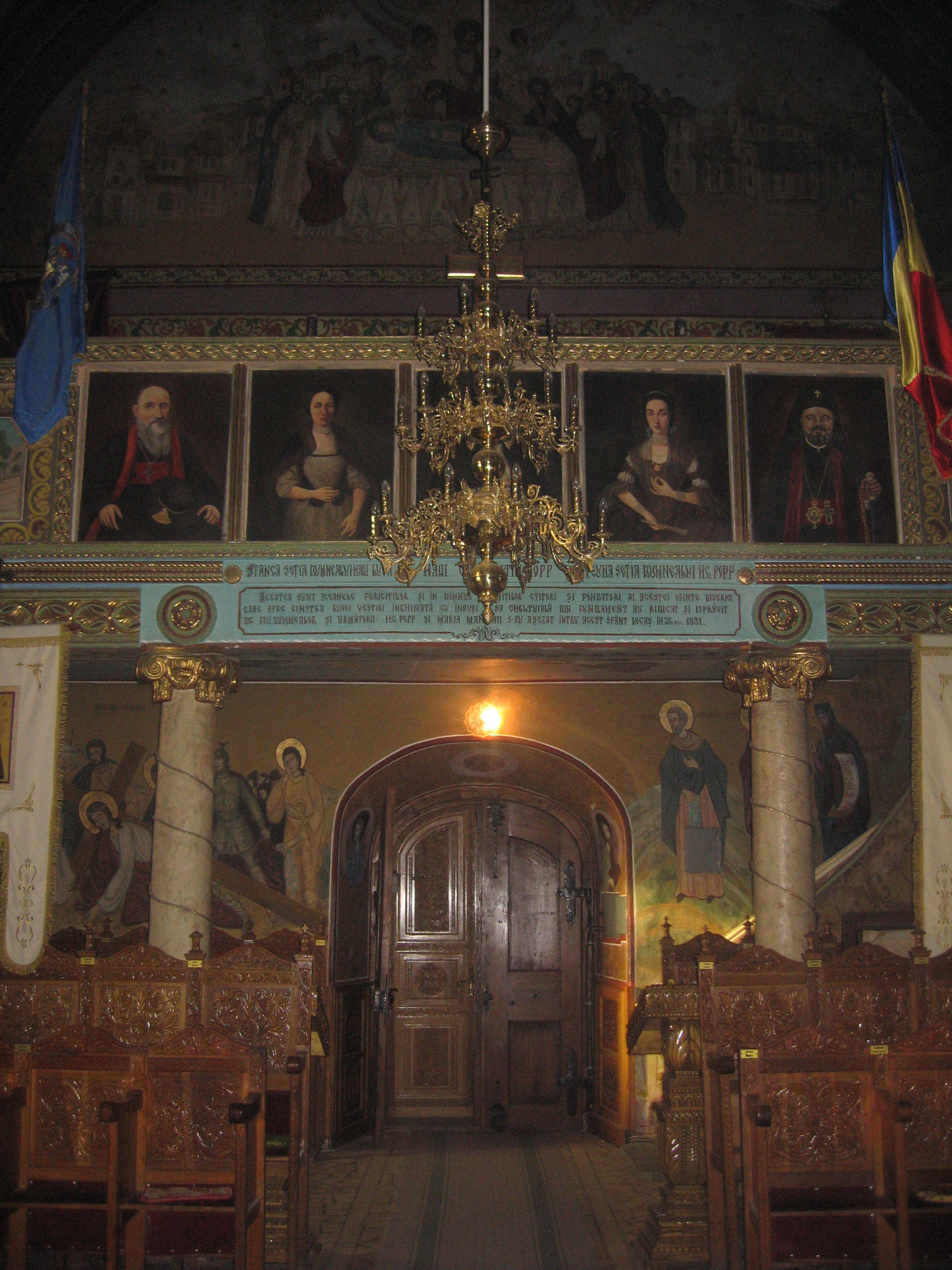
Paintings of ktitors
