= Ioan Mețianu =

Austro-Hungarian cleric

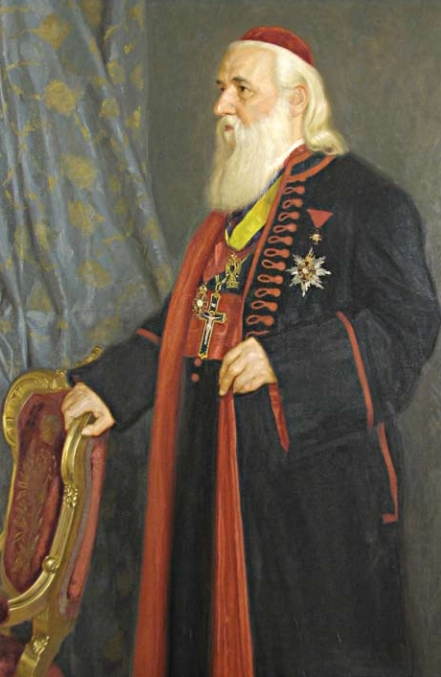
Ioan Mețianu (portrait by Arthur Coulin)

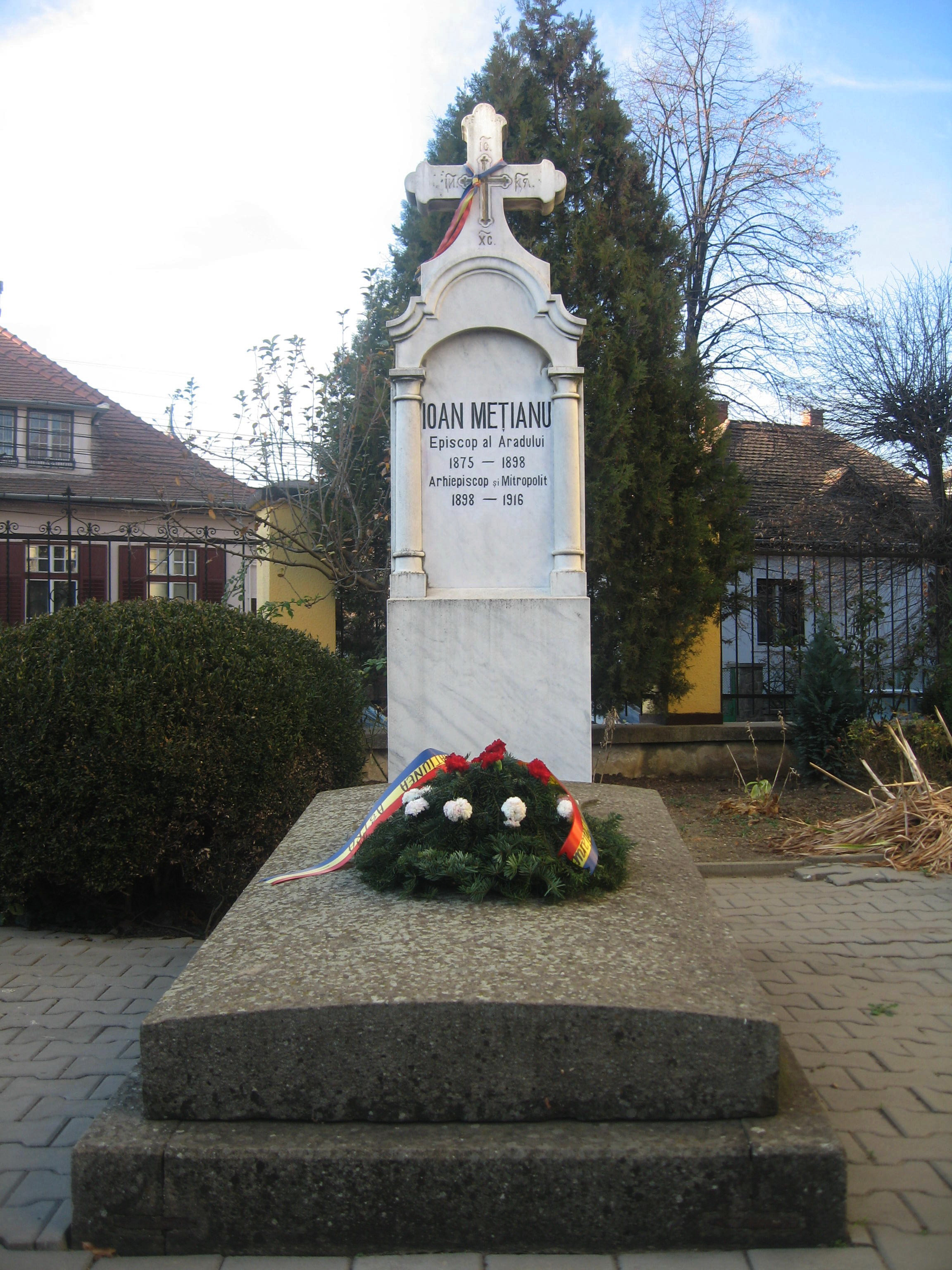
Grave at the Annunciation Church

Ioan Mețianu (Romanian pronunciation: [iˈo̯an metsiˈanu]; May 9, 1828–February 3, 1916) was an Austro-Hungarian cleric of the Romanian Orthodox Church.

Born in Zărnești, in the Transylvania region, he attended high school in Brașov and Cluj, studying theology in Sibiu. He served as a priest in Râșnov (1853-1857) and in Zărnești (1857-1874), rising to archpriest in 1859. He belonged to various diocesan institutions in Sibiu, was a member of the national church council and an ally of Metropolitan Andrei Șaguna. After remaining a widower, he was elected vicar bishop for Oradea, a post he held from 1874 to 1875. Then, from 1875 to 1898, he was Bishop of Arad. In December 1898, he was elected Archbishop of Sibiu and Metropolitan of Transylvania. Enthroned the following March, Mețianu remained in office until his death.

While still an archpriest, Mețianu organized Romanian confessional primary schools, guided the building of churches and, in 1865, was elected to the Transylvanian Diet. While bishop of Arad, he supervised numerous primary schools, founded a girls' middle school in Arad and a boys' boarding school in Beiuș, started a diocesan printing press, launched the newsletter Biserica și școala in 1877, constructed a new building for the theological-pedagogical institute and founded an endowment for poor priests and widowed priests' wives.

As metropolitan, he initiated and led building work for the new cathedral, as well as for the theological-pedagogical institute's new building. He guided the activity of this institute, of Telegraful Român newspaper and of the nearly 800 confessional primary schools in the archdiocese; and started endowments for Romanian pupils and students, or for other cultural and philanthropic purposes. In the Diet of Hungary, he belonged to both the House of Representatives and the House of Magnates, where he defended maternal-language rights in Romanian primary schools.

His articles, speeches and sermons appeared in Biserica și școala and Telegraful Român.
