= Transylvanian Memorandum =

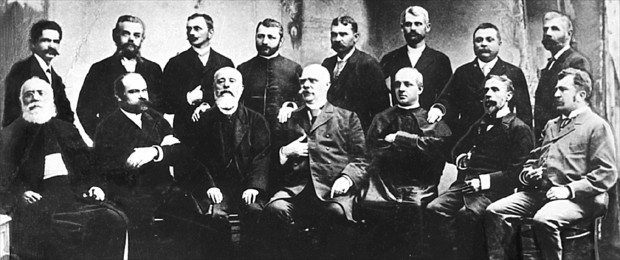
The signers of the Memorandum up row, from left to right: Dionisie Roman, Patriciu Barbu, Dr. Daniil Popovici-Barcianu, Gherasim Domide, Dr. Teodor Mihali, Dr. Aurel Suciu, Mihaiu Veliciu, Rubin Patiția down row, from left to right: Nicolae Cristea, Iuliu Coroianu, Gheorghe Pop de Băsești, Dr. Ioan Rațiu, Dr. Vasile Lucaciu, Dimitrie Comșa, Septimiu Albini

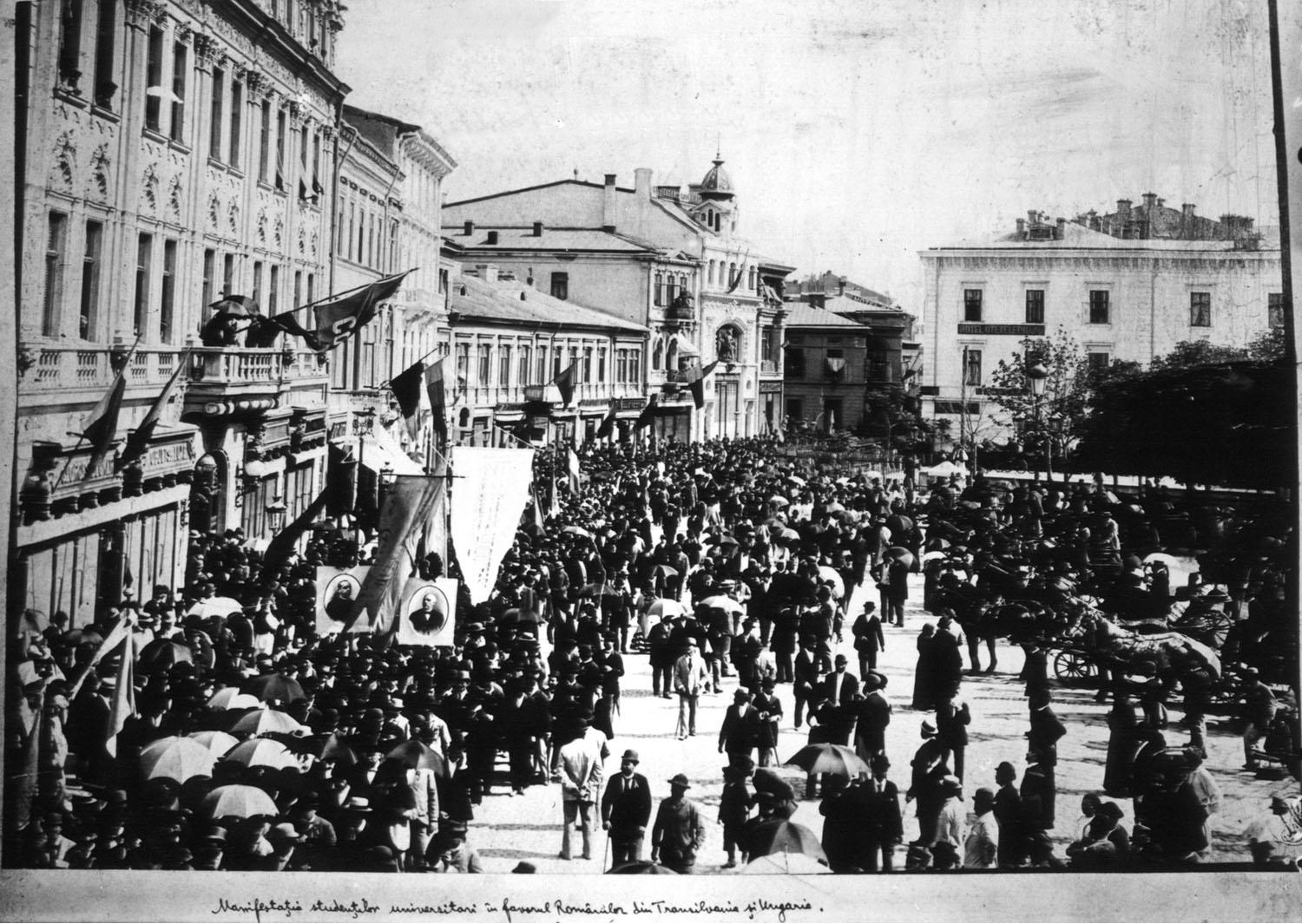
June 1892 protests in Bucharest supporting the Memorandum

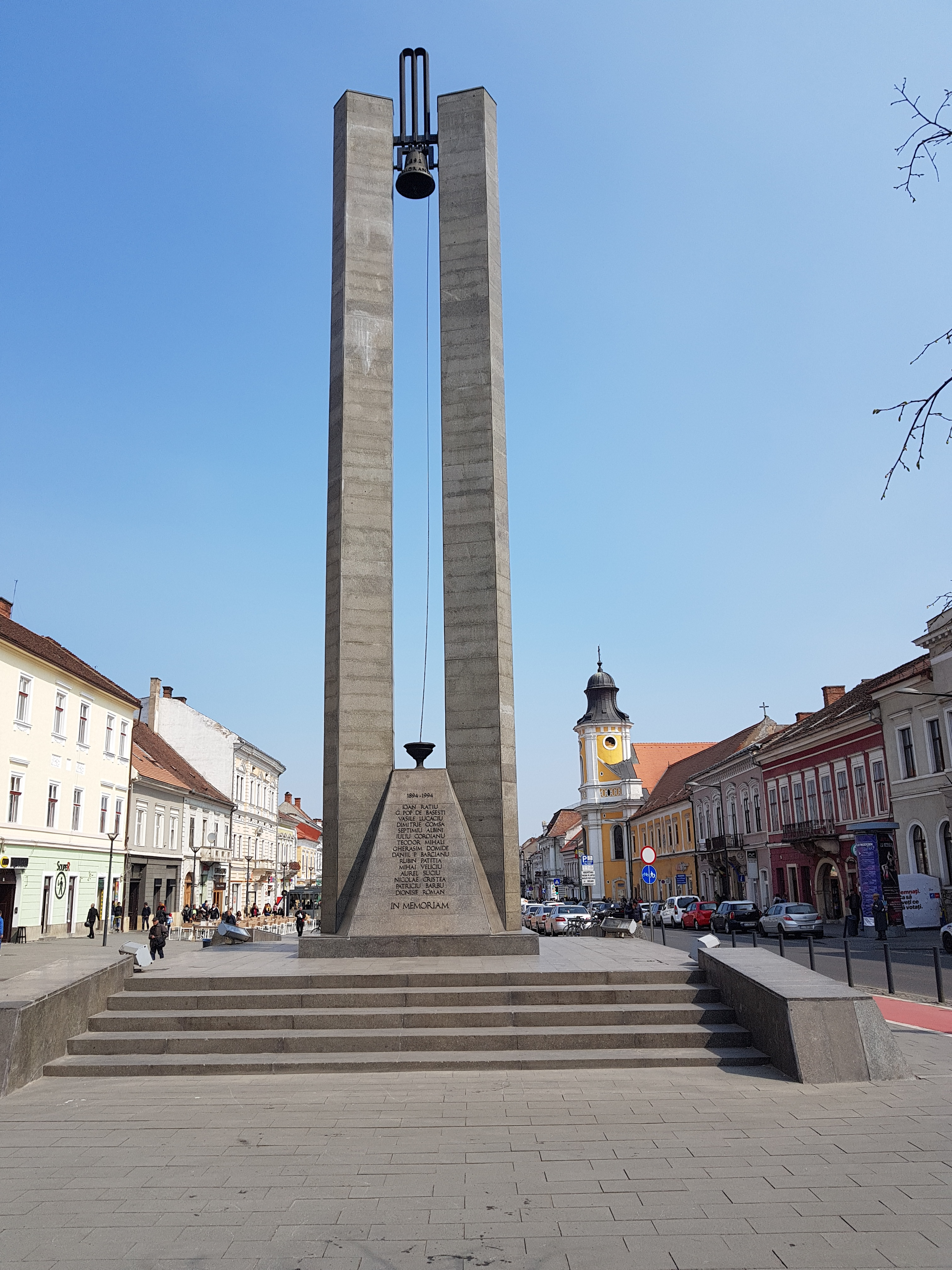
Memorandum Monument on Eroilor Avenue in Cluj-Napoca

The Transylvanian Memorandum (Romanian: Memorandumul Transilvaniei) was a petition sent in 1892 by the leaders of the Romanians of Transylvania to the Austro-Hungarian Emperor-King Franz Joseph, asking for equal ethnic rights with the Hungarians, and demanding an end to persecutions and Magyarization attempts.

== Status ==
After the Austro-Hungarian Compromise of 1867 (Ausgleich), Transylvania again became the integral part of Hungary. Initially Romanians (through their representatives, the Romanian National Party) took part in the political life, however, since 1869 after several disagreements they chose to enter into political passivity. They had several complaints; i.e. Romanians formed the majority of Transylvania's population, but they were underrepresented in the Hungarian Parliament due to electoral abuses and the higher property qualification required by the electoral laws, (Note: According to Robert Seton-Watson's Corruption and Reform in Hungary – A Study of Electoral Practice; such as declaring bridges as unsafe, placing all the horses under verterinary supervision to force the supporters of the opposition to make long detours on bad sideroads, keeping the body of peasant voters waiting for several days in rainy or frosty weather in order to make them quit or switch their allegiance, closing the polls at the discretion of the authorities, or, ultimately, the sheer use of violence by the Army or the Gendarmerie), gerrymandering, and the higher property qualification required in Transylvania by the electoral laws (due to this different property qualification for Transylvania, an ethnic Romanian peasant had to own "at least six times as much land as his Magyar equal, before he can obtain a vote").) they were subjected to Magyarization and they resented that Transylvania had lost its autonomy, without consulting the Transylvanians.

The Memorandum itself was written by the leaders of the Romanian National Party of Transylvania and Banat (PNR) – among others, Ioan Rațiu, Gheorghe Pop de Băsești, Eugen Brote, Aurel Popovici, and Vasile Lucaciu. It asked for political rights to be awarded to Romanians, as well as initiating a debate on the Kingdom of Hungary's policies of intolerance towards Romanians.

== Consequences ==
Franz Joseph, without reading it, forwarded the memorandum to the Hungarian Prime Minister Gyula Szapáry, who, also without reading it, forwarded it unopened to the Ispán of Torda-Aranyos County in order to be returned to the sender, Ioan Rațiu.

Met with refusal, the PNR leaders did not give up and published the document in Nagyszeben. Making the memorandum public led to violence from the part of Hungarian demonstrators, who damaged Ioan Rațiu's home in Torda, causing a tremendous outcry in Romania. Consequently, the Hungarian government gave in to the pressure of Hungarian nationalists and launched proceedings against the PNR president, Raţiu, the vice president, Pop de Băsești, the secretaries Vasile Lucaciu and Septimiu Albini, and other PNR leaders who acknowledged their involvement in drafting and publishing the petition. On 7 May 1894 eighteen leaders of the PNR were put on trial in Kolozsvár for various charges, ranging from disturbing the peace to incitement through the press and high treason.

After seventeen days, the trial came to an end and the jury found all but four defendants guilty. The rest of fourteen defendants were found guilty for incitement through the press, and the judge handed in the verdicts: most of them sentenced to prison terms from two months to five years. The PNR president Raţiu received a sentence of two years imprisonment and Lucaciu, regarded as the main instigator, received five years imprisonment. Although in 1895 they were freed by royal amnesty, loyalty to the Crown decreased, with many leaders of the PNR turning towards the goal of union of Transylvania with Romania.

However, activism for union per se was largely held off until after World War I and the Treaty of Trianon, with Romania itself oscillating between alliances with the Central Powers and the Entente, and with the parallel offer made by Archduke Franz Ferdinand of Austria (the heir apparent) to negotiate for a compromise (see United States of Greater Austria).

== See also ==
- Supplex Libellus Valachorum
- Unio Trium Nationum
