= Miron Romanul =

Austro-Hungarian cleric

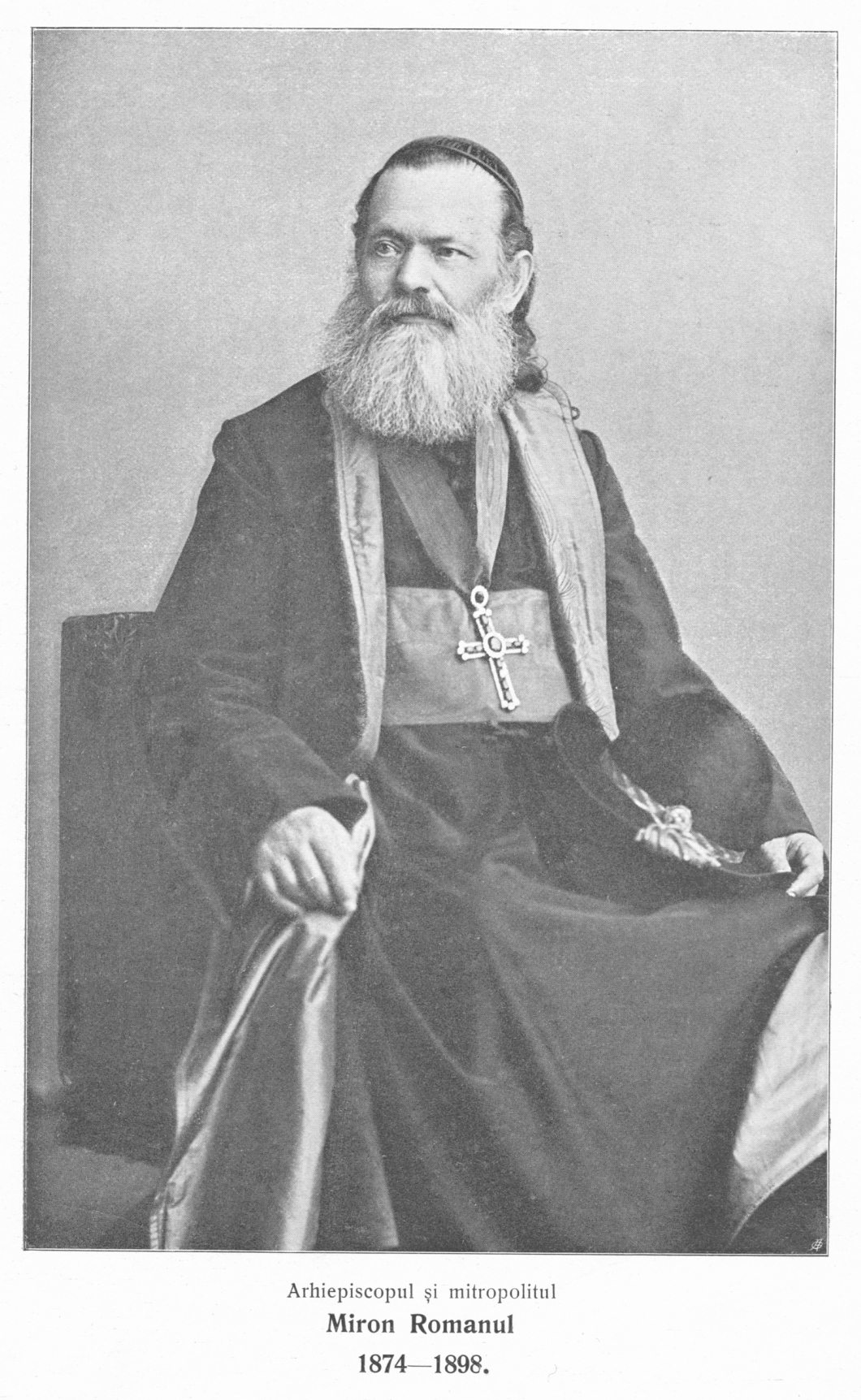
Miron Romanul

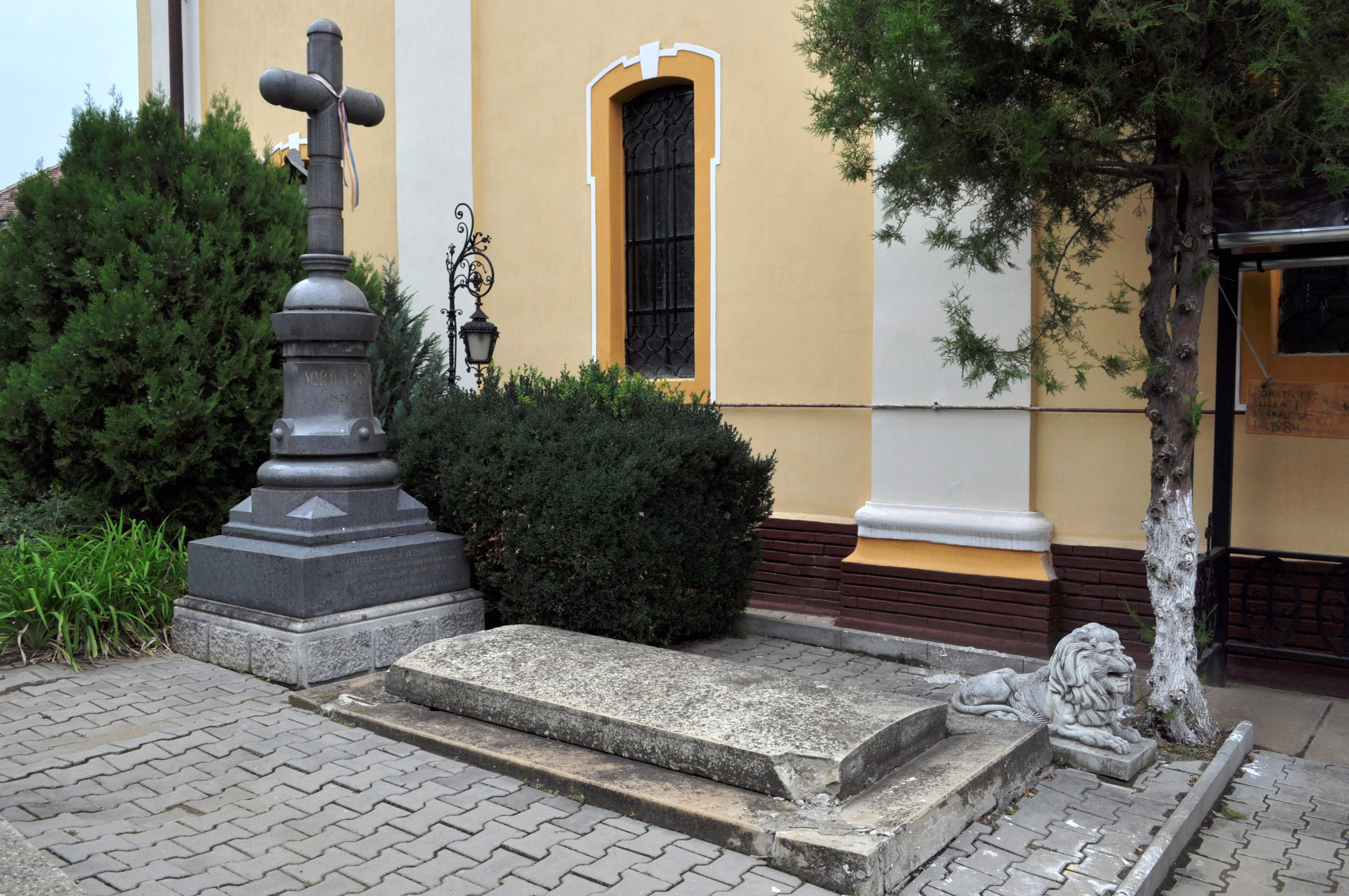
Grave at the Annunciation Church

Miron Romanul (Romanian pronunciation: [miˈron roˈmanul]; born Moise Romanul ([ˈmo.ise]); September 4 [O.S. August 23] 1828–October 16 [O.S. October 4] 1898) was an Austro-Hungarian cleric of the Romanian Orthodox Church.

Born into a peasant family in Mézes, Bihar County (now Mizieș, Bihor County), he attended the Romanian Greek-Catholic gymnasium in nearby Beiuș, followed by the Hungarian high school in Oradea. He then studied theology in Arad from 1846 to 1849. At Arad, he was secretary and, from 1863, diocesan adviser. He was tonsured a monk in 1857 at the Hodoș-Bodrog Monastery, being ordained a deacon and then a priest in 1863. From 1857 to 1869, he taught at the theological-pedagogical institute in Arad. From 1869 to 1870, he was school inspector for Krassó-Szörény County, from 1870 to 1873 he was vice president of the Orthodox consistory in Oradea, and in 1871 he attained the rank of archimandrite. In November 1873, he was elected Bishop of Arad, and was enthroned in February 1874. Elected Archbishop of Sibiu and Metropolitan of Transylvania that November, he was enthroned the following month and remained in office until his death.

While a professor of theology, Romanul wrote several textbooks that remain in manuscript. He wrote for the Sibiu-based Telegraful Român and for the Pest Concordia and Federațiunea. Active within Asociația națională arădeană pentru cultura poporului român, he was at the forefront of the Arad Romanian National Party (PNR) organization and was elected to the Diet of Hungary's House of Representatives in 1869. He later broke with the PNR due to the later's passivism following the Austro-Hungarian Compromise and founded the Romanian Moderate Party. As metropolitan, he sat in the House of Magnates, where he defended Romanians' rights on a number of occasions, in particular intervening on behalf of their confessional schools in 1879 and 1883. He guided the activity of the theological-pedagogical institute and helped finance the education of numerous students, offering them scholarships from the metropolis' funds or from endowments it managed (such as that left by Emanoil Gojdu). During his reign, new archdiocesan buildings were constructed. In April 1896, he sent out a circular urging his clergy and faithful not to participate in Hungary's millennium celebrations.
