= Romanian National Party =

Dissolved political party of the Kingdom of Hungary and Romania

Romanian National Party Partidul Național Român
- Founded: 12 May 1881
- Dissolved: 10 October 1926
- Merged into: National Peasants' Party
- Ideology: Transylvanianism; Regionalism; Radicalism; Liberal conservatism Romanian nationalism
- Political position: Centre-right

The Romanian National Party (Partidul Național Român, PNR), initially known as the Romanian National Party in Transylvania and Banat (Partidul Național Român din Transilvania și Banat), was a political party which was initially designed to offer ethnic representation to Romanians in the Kingdom of Hungary, the Transleithanian half of Austria-Hungary, and especially to those in Transylvania and Banat. After the end of World War I, it became one of the main parties in Romania, and formed the government with Alexandru Vaida-Voevod between November 1919 and March 1920.

== History ==
=== In Austria-Hungary ===
The party was formed on May 12, 1881, as the union of the National Party of Romanians in Transylvania (Partidul Național al Românilor din Transilvania) and the National Party of Romanians in Banat and Hungary (Partidul Național al Românilor din Banat și Ungaria), both created in 1869 (two years after the Austro-Hungarian Compromise of 1867). Its policies were connected with Liberalism and the Romanian middle class, and challenged the centralism of the Budapest government, calling for an end to Magyarization policies and a more representative Hungarian Parliament (as the suffrage was still wealth-based, thus favoring the Transylvanian Hungarians over an initially largely peasant Romanian population).

The majority of its leaders were Greek-Catholic, following a trend in regional politics started with the introduction of the Eastern Catholic Churches in the early 18th century, when conversions had been encouraged by the Habsburg monarchy with promises of civil rights in exchange; throughout the following period, although a minority in comparison with the Orthodox Romanian community, Greek-Catholics had been the leaders of all communal political projects appealing directly to Vienna (beginning with the 1791 Supplex Libellus Valachorum).

The previous generation of ethnic Romanian politicians (especially its central figure, Andrei Şaguna) felt largely disappointed by the Austrian Empire policies of negotiations with Budapest after the 1848 Revolutions (culminating in the dissolving of the Transylvanian Diet and the Ausgleich - with Transylvania's reincorporation into Hungary), and had taken refuge in cultural ventures such as ASTRA; at the same time, Romania's alliance with Austria-Hungary and the German Empire, carried out under King Carol I and the Conservative Party cabinets, had prevented any assistance other than maintaining educational and religious facilities of the Romanian communities. As such, the PNR filled a void on the political scene, and, as many other Austro-Hungarian parties demanding ethnic rights, centered its maximal demands on finding a new administrative framework for the Empire.

The PNR did not recognize the Austro-Hungarian Compromise of 1867, demanding the reestablishment of the autonomous Grand Principality of Transylvania. As such, it did not engage in the Hungarian elections until 1905. As such, a faction that supported electoralism split and formed the Romanian Moderate Party.

After 1906, the PNR was one of two parties offering representation, as socialist Romanian groups in the region united to form the Social Democratic Party of Transylvania and Banat.

In 1892, the PNR was involved in the Transylvanian Memorandum movement, an overt appeal to the Court in Vienna for a change in the Hungarian political system. As Franz Joseph forwarded the petition to Budapest, signers of the document were prosecuted for treason, and many of them were sentenced to long prison terms in 1894. For most PNR members and the Romanian community at large, the event proved to be seminal, as it led to an increase in the determination to discard projects of cohabitation within the Empire, and a focus on a union with the Romanian Old Kingdom. However, many party leaders, including Iuliu Maniu and Alexandru Vaida-Voevod, supported the federalist solution favored by the heir apparent, Archduke Franz Ferdinand, until his 1914 assassination in Sarajevo (see: United States of Greater Austria ).

World War I proved to be decisive. After 1916, when Romania joined the Entente Powers and was invaded by a German-Austro-Hungarian force, most Transylvanian Romanians questioned their own loyalism. Hungary's increasingly independent policies, brought about by the Aster Revolution, resulted in its full independence in November 1918, as the Austro-Hungarian monarchy collapsed. Seeing themselves guided by Woodrow Wilson's Fourteen Points, the PNR and Social-Democrats (grouped since early October as Consiliul Național Român, the Romanian National Council) convened a popular gathering in Alba Iulia on December 1, one which voted in favor of union with Romania and established a Directory Council as a provisional government for the region, under the leadership of Iuliu Maniu.

=== In Romania ===
As the main party in Transylvania, and an advocate of autonomy, the PNR soon clashed with the National Liberal Party (PNL), the dominating and highly centralist force in the Old Kingdom. The latter had ensured its domination over Romanian politics under the leadership of Ion I. C. Brătianu, having aligned Romania with the Entente in 1916, thus giving a final blow to the pro-Central Powers Conservative Party and putting an end to the traditional two-party system, but found itself the target of newly created populist movements who held it responsible for the prolonged chaos the country had found itself plunged into (see Romanian Campaign (World War I)). As the PNL was unchallenged as the party on the Right, the new movements questioned its reserves in front of the promised land reform (with a Liberal version of very limited scope having been carried out in 1918), and resented its opposition to the replacement of the 1866 Constitution of Romania.

When the elections of 1919 confirmed the disestablishment of the PNL monopoly in front of new and various forces, the PNR and the agrarian Peasants' Party (PȚ) formed the government under the PNR's Alexandru Vaida-Voevod. However, it soon clashed with other forces in Parliament over the issue of Ion Mihalache's plan for a in-depth reform. In return, Brătianu started negotiations with one of the PNL's main opponents, the People's Party and its leader Alexandru Averescu, reaching a compromise over disputed issues, and channelling Averescu's opposition towards the PNR and the PȚ (aided by the fact that the People's Party had included a dissidence of the PNR under Octavian Goga).

The failures and radicalism of the Vaida-Voevod government allowed King Ferdinand, a close political ally of the PNL, to dissolve it in March 1920. In April, the new Averescu government, in line with PNL politics, dissolved the Directory Council in Transylvania. Averescu's was viewed as a transitional cabinet, and was soon followed by a new period of Liberal supremacy: much to the outrage of the opposition forces, it allowed Brătianu to pass the 1923 Constitution, a centralist document, through a regular vote in Parliament; nonetheless, the PNL ultimately used the template of land reform proposed by Mihalache, which only served to increase its support. The PNR absorbed the Bessarabian Peasants' Party faction led by Ion Pelivan in 1923.

In 1925, after a failed attempt by Ferdinand to have the PNR and the PNL merge, the former further expanded its appeal when it joined forces with Nicolae Iorga's independent nationalist group (successor to the Democratic Nationalist Party, which had been noted for its pro-Entente activism at the start of the World War), a brief union which saw Iorga as the honorary president of the PNR. That year, the party also fused with the group led by Constantin Argetoianu (which had emerged from the People's Party and had been included regardless of previous animosities between Argetoianu and the PNR), as well as with the minor factions representing the legacy of the Conservatives. The previous year, the PNR and the PȚ formally announced their fusion, only to split after just two days over the presence of the Poporanist Constantin Stere at the forefront of the latter.

As new elections in 1926 seemed to confirm the ascendancy of a PNR-PȚ coalition, the two groups refused a proposal by Averescu to join forces. Ultimately, they were blocked out of government by the Royal Prerogative of Ferdinand, and gave in to a new Liberal-backed People's Party cabinet. The two parties were brought into a short period of overt hostility to the political system: the king's fatal illness caused Maniu to start talks for an illegal ascension to the throne for Prince Carol (who had been banned from succession for his behaviour during World War I); at the same time, the PNR sought a new agreement with Miklós Horthy's Hungary over the borders created by the Treaty of Trianon, a gesture sanctioned by Carol and mediated by Viscount Rothermere. Such initiatives were soon blocked by the Romanian government, which called on the United Kingdom to expel Carol from its territory. Although Carol returned to rule as king with Maniu's backing (in 1930, replacing his own son Michael I), talks on Transylvanian topics were cancelled - partly owing to the emerging rivalry between the monarch and Maniu.

On October 10, 1926, the PNR and PȚ put their differences aside and became the National Peasants' Party (PNȚ), which was to remain, alongside the PNL and despite numerous dissidences, one of the two main parties until the establishment of Carol's authoritarian regime in 1938. After a period in clandestinity extended throughout World War II, it was to emerge as an important force between late 1944 and its banning six months before the proclamation of a People's Republic of Romania.

== Party leaders ==
Nicolae Popea	1881–1882
Partenie Cosma	1882–1883
George Bariț	1884–1888
Ioan Rațiu	1889–1890
Vincențiu Babeș	1890–1891
Ioan Rațiu	1892–1902
Vasile Mangra	1894–1896
Ioan Rațiu	1896–1902
Gheorghe Pop de Băsești	1903–1919
Iuliu Maniu	1919–1926

== Electoral history ==
=== Legislative elections ===
Election	Votes	%	Assembly	Senate	Position
1919			169 / 568	76 / 216	1st
1920			27 / 366	14 / 166	2nd
1922			26 / 372	9 / 148	3rd
1926	37,672	1.4	0 / 387	0 / 115	7th
