= Andrei Șaguna =

Romanian saint and metropolitan of Transylvania (1808–1873)

Saint Andrei Șaguna
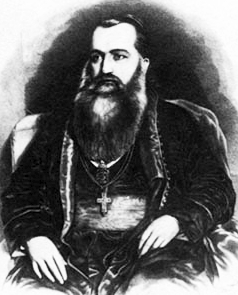

Metropolitan bishop of the Orthodox Church in Transylvania
- Born: 20 January 1808; Miskolc, Hungary
- Died: 28 June 1873; Nagyszeben, Hungary
- Venerated in: Romanian Orthodox Church
- Canonized: 2011-10-29, Sibiu by the Synod of the Romanian Orthodox Church
- Major shrine: Holy Trinity Cathedral, Sibiu
- Feast: 30 November (NS)
- Patronage: Romania

Andrei Șaguna (Romanian pronunciation: [anˈdrej ʃaˈɡuna]; 20 January 1808, Miskolc, Hungary – 28 June 1873, Nagyszeben, Hungary) was a Metropolitan bishop of the Romanian Orthodox Church in Transylvania, and one of the Romanian community political leaders in the Habsburg monarchy, especially active during the 1848 Revolution. He was an honorary member of the Romanian Academy.

== Early life ==
He was Aromanian in origin, his family having settled with Naum Șaguna (Andrei's father) in Hungary from Grabova, now Albania. With the guidance of local Piarists, Șaguna's parents had opted to convert to Roman Catholicism, seeking to obtain a better status than the second-class one reserved for most Eastern Orthodox subjects of the Habsburgs. However, the Șagunas most likely continued to practice their original religion in secret - the future Metropolitan was probably never a practising Catholic. The Șagunas were related to the wealthy Sina banking family.

After he rejoined the Orthodox Church while living and studying in Pest, Andrei Șaguna became a monk and started his ecclesiastical career in the Banat region. As he was becoming a convinced nationalist, Șaguna refused to join the "Serbian" Patriarchate of Karlovci's hierarchy in Sremski Karlovci (at the time, the Orthodox Christians in Banat were under the jurisdiction of the Serbian Church). Instead, he left for Transylvania - where he was able to integrate within a Romanian-dominated clergy.

== In the Revolution ==
Șaguna got involved in the movement that sought increased rights for Romanians and demanded that Transylvania would become an autonomous entity of the Monarchy after the Hungarian Revolution of 1848 (as opposed to the Hungarian plans for a Union of the two). As such, Șaguna was present at the Blaj Assembly in May, where he argued for a moderate position. The respect he enjoyed, as well as his will for mediation got him elected to the executive of the Romanian movement, and soon after he was to be the main delegate petitioning Emperor Ferdinand I of Austria and the Vienna government.

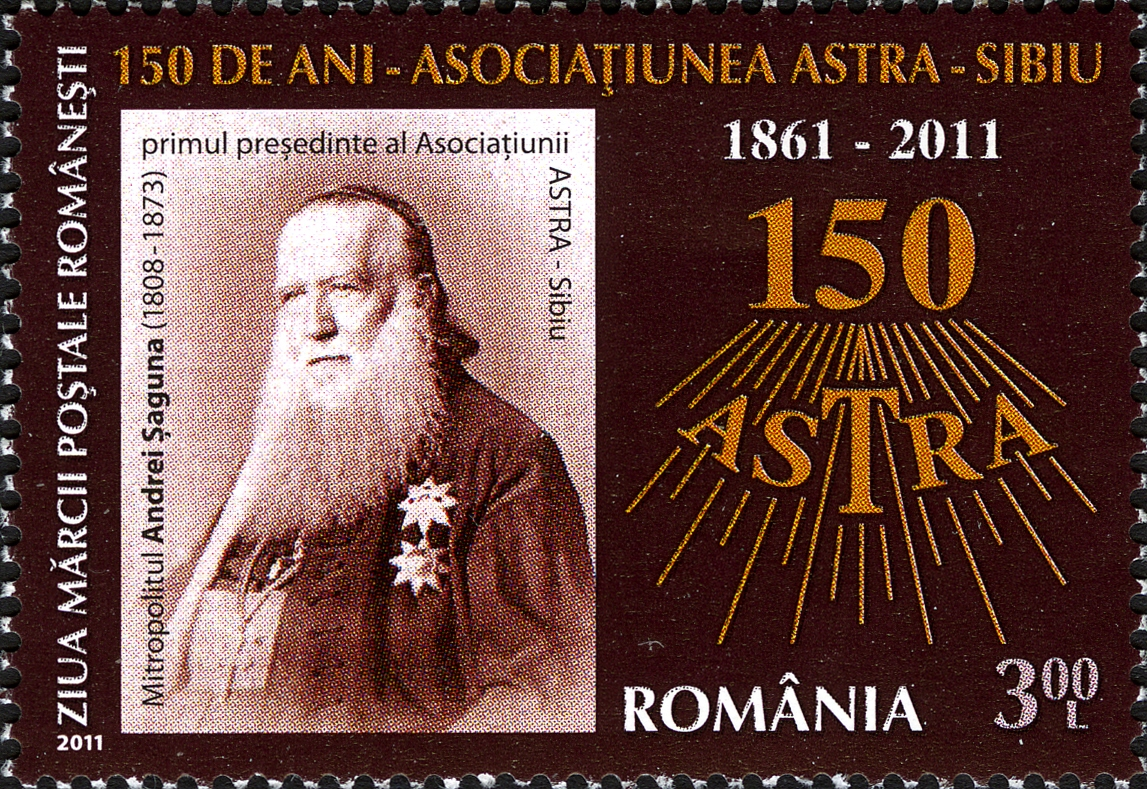

As the Hungarians effectively imposed the union project at the end of the same month, Andrei Șaguna joined the side that still sought a compromise. The Romanian envoys led by him negotiated with the Hungarian side until September, when the conflict between Hungary and the Habsburgs erupted, coupled with an understanding between the Romanians and Vienna (the former were allowed to create a loyalist administration in Transylvania). In October, as Transylvania became a battleground, Şaguna and the rest of the Romanian leadership took refuge in Sibiu (where the Austrian army still held some ground).

Austrian General Anton Freiherr von Puchner, who had taken refuge to the Wallachian region of Oltenia, pressured Șaguna and other leaders to openly demand that Imperial Russian occupiers of Wallachia protect his last contingents as they evacuated Transylvania. His commanders were hoping to turn the tide by attacking Hungary from the west, and a Russian presence was not requested officially. However, as the troops in Transylvania were on the brink of destruction (and the rest of Puchner's army was being decimated by a cholera epidemic), a Romanian request was judged honorable. Prolonged negotiations led to a compromise, through which the Romanians agreed to appeal to the Russians through an unsigned petition issued by "Sibiu citizens". The Russians did respond, and helped Austrians into Wallachia - the refugees were to be followed by all the Romanian leaders.

The Hungarians leadership reacted with anger at the outcome (since it prolonged the war and created a precedent). Information got out about Şaguna's involvement, which leader Lajos Kossuth feared to be a confirmation that the Eastern Orthodox Romanians had accommodated Pan-Slavism. In offers of peace he sent to Romanian insurgent Avram Iancu, Kossuth singled out Şaguna as an enemy, specifying that no offer of amnesty would include the cleric.

In February 1849, as the tide of a second and decisive Russian military action grew near, Andrei Şaguna left for Austria, where he drew suspicion by trying to reanimate a previous project, which asked for a common Romanians-in-Austria realm (Transylvania together with the Banat and Bukovina). Such demands proved decisive after the crushing of Kossuth's movement: Austria steadily withdrew its offers to Romanians, as it feared that encouragement of their cause would lead to a Hungarian-like crisis.

== Later activities ==
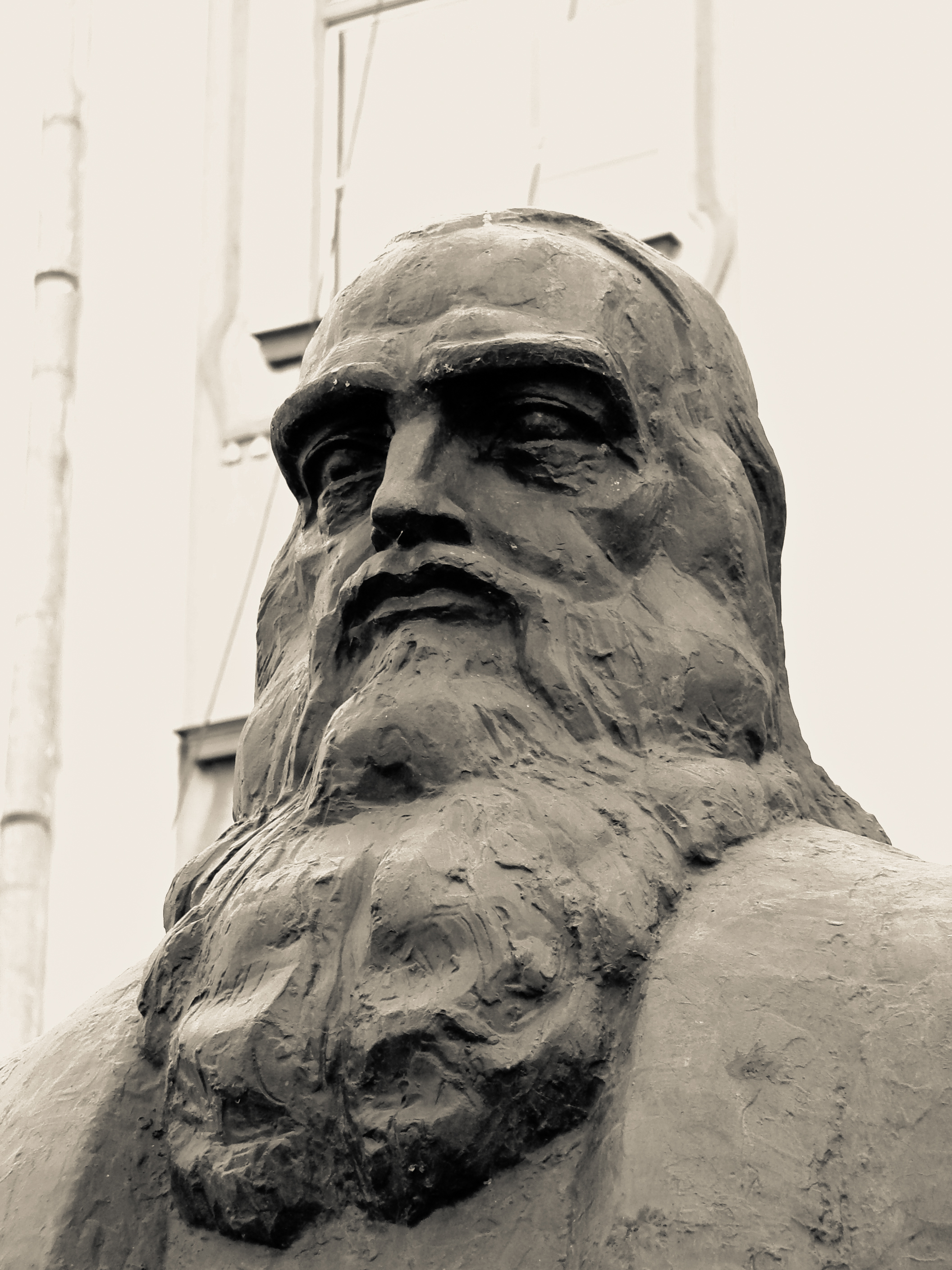
Andrei Șaguna - statue in front of the ASTRA Palace in Sibiu

In 1850, Șaguna was again leader of a delegation to Vienna, asking Franz Joseph I of Austria for an institution of higher learning to be approved by the Austrian leadership, and further liberties and education rights for the Romanian community. As the Austrians were highly skeptical of Romanian goals, most of these remained unanswered and further Romanian attempts were made useless after the 1867 Ausgleich cut off communication with Austria. Although Șaguna's activities had assured the recognition of an independent Romanian Transylvanian Orthodox Church in 1865 when the new autocephalous Metropolitanate of Sibiu was created by Imperial letter patent, the new administration meant the absorption of Transylvania into the Hungarian and centralized half of Austria-Hungary (with the disappearance of the Transylvanian Diet). Șaguna and other mainstream Romanian leaders found themselves forced to limit their activities to the cultural field. The cleric was the main activist of the 1861-founded ASTRA cultural society, and remained focused on its activities up until his death.

Still committed to parliamentarism, Andrei Șaguna radicalized his views on ethnic representation and sanctioned all attempts at trans-ethnical policies (he was especially harsh on Romanians who voted for Hungarian candidates in elections to the Hungarian Parliament).

A large number of institutions bear the name Andrei Șaguna, most of them educational ones in and around Sibiu.
