= Dan Simonescu =

Romanian historian (1902–1993)

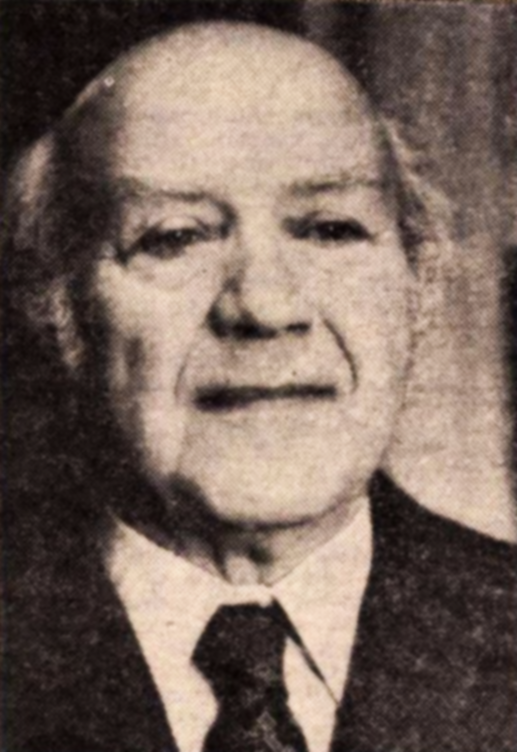
- Simonescu in 1977
- Born: Dan Simon; December 11, 1902; Câmpulung, Kingdom of Romania
- Died: March 10, 1993 (aged 90); Bucharest, Romania
- Other names: Simon Dănescu; Dan Simionescu

Academic background
- Education: University of Bucharest
- Influences: Ioan Bianu; Nicolae Cartojan

Academic work
- Era: 20th century
- Main interests: Romanian literature; Romanian folklore; comparative literature; bibliography; biblioteconomy; palaeography; medieval studies; Byzantine studies; Hellenic studies; Slavic studies

Dan Simonescu (born Dan Simon, also known as Simionescu and Simon Dănescu; December 11, 1902 – March 10, 1993) was a Romanian literary historian, bibliographer, folklorist, and librarian. His debut was in his late teens, when he accompanied Constantin Rădulescu-Codin during fieldwork in Muscel County, publishing his first contributions in the field of Romanian folklore. After graduating from the University of Bucharest in 1925, and publishing his first book, a collection of articles, in 1926, he became an assistant professor at his alma mater, and was also employed as a librarian by the Romanian Academy. Simonescu joined an editorial team headed by senior scholars Ioan Bianu and Nicolae Cartojan, and, in the 1930s and 1940s, became a major contributor to the collection and publication of old Romanian literature; he was also Cartojan's disciple, though the two disagreed on a parallel project, namely the publication of Mihail Kogălniceanu's collected works, with Simonescu favoring, and eventually putting out, a topical selection of Kogălniceanu's social-themed essays. His own first major contributions were his doctoral thesis, which explored court ceremonials in the Danubian Principalities, and a paper on the emergence of historiography in Early Modern Romania.

Having obtained a professorship at Iași University during World War II, Simonescu joined the Social Democratic Party in the late 1940s, and was briefly employed as a department head by the Education Ministry. He became marginalized during the early stages of Romanian communism: sent to do work at the Nicolae Iorga Institute of History and the Technical School for Librarians, he was involved in the technical aspects of bibliographic work. By 1956, he could return with more editions of Kogălniceanu, and more secretly networked with other old-regime intellectuals, including G. T. Kirileanu; they ensured the preservation and eventual resumption of cultural research that went against the official interpretation of Marxism–Leninism.

In the 1960s, the regime allowed Simonescu to teach at the Bucharest Pedagogical Institute, and then granted him a Bucharest University chair, which he preserved to his official retirement in 1972. He is widely seen as responsible for the definitive Kogălniceanu edition, while also contributing studies of ancient literature, including romances and rhyming chronicles, with additional returns to both bibliography and folkloristics. Simonescu was additionally instrumental in the rediscovery of historical writings by Balthasar Walther, though also criticized for allowing communist censors to remove a fragment referencing Michael the Brave's antisemitism. Organizing a specialized class for antiquarian booksellers when he was already in his late eighties, he continued to write into the early 1990s. Three years after the Romanian Revolution of 1989, and four months before his death, he was made an honorary member of the academy.

== Biography ==
=== Beginnings and interwar ===
Dan Simon was born on December 11, 1902, in Câmpulung, which was back then the seat of local government for Muscel, in the Kingdom of Romania. His parents, who adhered to the Romanian Orthodox Church, were the civil servant Ion Simon and his wife Ecaterina (née Slăvescu). The couple had eleven other children, including Romanian Land Forces Colonel Constantin Simonescu. The Simons, all of whom later used the name "Simonescu", had deeper ties to Muscel, with Ion being born at Suslănești village, near Mateiaș Hill; a local legend has it that Dan's grandfather, Simon of Suslănești, had spared the village devastation by pleading with the brigand Radu Anghel. Dan himself recalled being involved in village life from his early years, "with a sort of liberty that was rarely impinged upon by pedagogic principles."

The future scholar lived out World War I and occupation by German troops in that region. In late 1916, he had boarded with the mayor of Mioveni, witnessing first-hand the town's takeover by the Imperial German Army. He later referred to this period, which lasted down to the creation of Greater Romania in 1918, as one of wanton destruction. His early education was completed in Câmpulung and Pitești, where, according to his own recollections, he became more disciplined and began modelling himself on his teachers, especially Alexandru Bărcăcilă and Mihai Mihăileanu, who taught him Latin. After completing Ion Brătianu High School, Simon enrolled in the University of Bucharest in September 1921. He was initially drawn by classical scholarship, in the same class as Alexandru Graur, but was put off by professor Dumitru Evolceanu, whose teaching methods he regarded as superficial; he was instead impressed by Iuliu Valaori, who introduced him to Latin literature. According to his own recollections, in 1922 he met Constantin Rădulescu-Codin, a clerk and schoolteacher who was traveling throughout Muscel and Argeș Counties, collecting Romanian folklore; one such trip took them to Suslănești.

Looking back in 1981, Simonescu described Muscel and Argeș as a "region [...] with old, and, it seems to me, unaltered traditions." As noted by folklorist Mihail M. Robea, he was one of the young intellectuals who did much of the uncredited fieldwork, with the results of their research being effectively exploited by Codin. A fellow literary historian, G. G. Ursu, dates Simonescu's writing debut to 1923, noting his "unrelenting passion for books". These early contributions were published by Arthur Gorovei's specialized magazine of folkloristics, Șezătoarea. According to Gorovei's recollections, his first signature was Dan Simionescu, with Simonescu eventually settled as his definitive surname. He sometimes alternated it with a pen name, Simon Dănescu. "Student Dan I. Simonescu, originally from Câmpulung" was cited as an informant by the folklorist Ioan Aurel Candrea, referencing a Muscel legend which claimed that brigand Gheorghe Fulga had escaped from jail using a miraculous week called iarba fiarelor. He also rediscovered a collection of primary sources on Câmpulung's history, attributing it to the clerk Dumitru I. Băjan.

Simonescu was trained in palaeography, and in 1924–1925 held a job at the National Archives. He graduated university in 1925, when he also became a substitute high school teacher; he held a permanent position in 1929–1931. His first published volume was the 1926 Încercări istorico-literare ("Literary and Historical Essays"). Done from papers he presented at university seminars, it formulated Simonescu's identification of Alecu Russo as the author of a Romanian nationalist essay, Cântarea României, and presented Udriște Năsturel's translation of Barlaam and Josaphat. A separate chapter discussed Gheorghe Asachi's poetic debt to Adam Mickiewicz. Încercări was followed that same year by a monograph on the Câmpulung Monastery—Viața literară și culturală a Mănăstirii Câmpulung (Muscel) în trecut, which was essentially his final dissertation, with scholar Ioan Bianu as the supervisor. Drawing praise from the establishment historian Nicolae Iorga (and, as Simonescu notes, still cited by scholars into the 1970s), it was rated as "excellent" by Ursu. Also in 1926, Simonescu arranged for print the late Rădulescu-Codin's final manuscript, a monograph of Câmpulung.

Upon Bianu's recommendation, and upon finishing his mandatory military service in December 1927, Simonescu became a teaching assistant at Bucharest's Faculty of Letters and Philosophy. He replaced Nicolae Cartojan, who had been advanced to lecturer, and was originally a substitute for Iorga (to 1929). He was later accepted as a provisional (1931) and permanent (1938) assistant; from 1931, he was also a librarian at the Romanian Academy collections and the manuscript section of the Central University Library. His first tasks were in cataloguing Teodor Burada's documentary fund. His second specialization was in Byzantine studies, after attending a seminar held by philologist Demostene Russo in 1933–1934. Collaborating with senior bibliographers such as Bianu and Cartojan, who informed his approach to historiography, he became fascinated with incunabula; on behalf of the academy, he was editor of the well-received third-volume of Bibliografia românească veche ("Old Romanian Bibliography"), which came out in 1936. Also that year, his own literary reviews were collected into a single volume (as Istorie literară în recenzii). From 1935, he also taught at a pedagogical high school in Bucharest—a stint which ended in 1938 or 1940.

Researcher Nicolae Scurtu notes that Simonescu's enduring admiration for Bianu and Cartojan were "of a rare kind in the Romanian cultural space." He maintained his admiration of Cartojan throughout his life, calling him a "perfect man", as well as "just, decent, humane, [and] self-effacing". Cartojan, alongside Bianu, Russo and others whom he met at the academy, gave him living proof that "one cannot complete a thorough paper without sacrificing one's hours of leisure and entertainment, one's personal and family interests, one's health and friendships." As Cartojan's assistant at the Bucharest faculty of letters, Simonescu held two seminars—one teaching students the minutiae of the Romanian Cyrillic alphabet, and the other familiarizing them with the major works of old Romanian literature. Spurred on by Cartojan, he attended specialized courses at Athens and Istanbul (1934), followed by an extended stay as a visiting scholar at the Bibliothèque nationale de France in Paris (1937). Also in 1937, he issued a monograph called Dela istorie la istorie literară, which discussed Alexandru Lapedatu's contribution as a historian. On May 16 of that year, he published in Curentul an article which announced the first efforts to establish comparative literature as an independent academic domain.

=== Wartime and communist repression ===
Simonescu took a doctorate of letters in 1938, with a paper on the court ceremonial in the old Danubian Principalities. Its starting point was a Moldavian codex of 1762, compiled in Greek and identified as the work of Logothete Georgiaki. This had been first issued in print in the 19th century by scholar Mihail Kogălniceanu, whose errors he was forced to correct as part of his commentary. Simonescu's first article on this subject had been published by Cartojan's Cercetări Literare magazine, which had him as a contributor into the 1940s; according to Scurtu, it was this collaboration which fully consolidated his reputation. A younger literary historian, Dimitrie Păcurariu, rates his definitive, published thesis a work of reference for the study of older Romanian literature; another scholar, Mircea Anghelescu, sees it as "marking a date in Romanian medieval studies". Historian Emil Lăzărescu took a reserved view, noting that Simonescu had failed to reveal some of his sources, and that the paper contained too few direct citations from Georgiakis. He believed that the work was rather a "point of departure" for later investigations. Also in 1938, Simonescu and Emil Murcade put out an introduction to books of Arabic literature appearing in Wallachia, followed in 1939 by their study, Tipar românesc pentru arabi în secolul al XVIII-lea ("Romanian Printing for the Arabs during the 18th Century"). Simonescu underwent further training in France during 1939.

During World War II and the Ion Antonescu dictatorship, Simonescu was substitute professor at the Higher School of Archives and Paleography (1939–1941; 1942–1943). In early 1941, after a brief civil war against the Iron Guard, Antonescu and his new Education Minister, Radu R. Rosetti, proceeded with a purge of known Guardists in academia. As part of this maneuver, Giorge Pascu was forced to resign from the Bucharest University's Chair of Old Literature; Cartojan tried to get Simonescu nominated for that position, but failed to obtain relevant support. Simonescu functioned instead as a substitute professor at the Letters and Philosophy Faculty of Iași University (1941–1942), but no longer employed by the Central Library after 1942. Alongside Ion C. Chițimia and Alexandru Rosetti, and under Cartojan's guidance, he began publishing a corpus of old Romanian literature, of which only three volumes came out (two in 1942, and the third, namely the German Chronicle of Stephen the Great's reign, in 1944). During his tenure, Romania entered the war as an ally of Nazi Germany, participating in the invasion of the Soviet Union. In December 1941, Convorbiri Literare hosted Simonescu's homage to three of his seminar students who had since been killed on the Eastern Front; it referred to the "Eastern enemy" as "a dispenser of human misery and a persecutor of the [Christian] cross". In October–November 1943, he visited the Transnistria Governorate, established by Antonescu in former Soviet territory, and lectured at Odesa University. By then, he was also affiliated with Victor Papacostea's Balcania group, which, although well received (and budgeted) by Antonescu, conflicted with the Greater Germanic Reich by reviving Balkan federalism.

Simonescu was the first expert to investigate the collection of Romanian manuscripts that scholar Moses Gaster had bequeathed to the academy, publishing his results in a 1940 issue of Viața Romînească. His other research at the Higher School was taken up in print with a 1943 tract on the emergence of a critical dimension in Romania's history-writing (Spiritul critic în istoriografia veche românească). It detailed the old chroniclers' emancipation from the standards imposed by Constantine Manasses, dwelling on Grigore Ureche and Miron Costin's effort to distinguish propaganda and calumny from historical truth. Taking over as head of Iași University's Chair of Old Romanian Literature in mid-1942, Simonescu successfully proposed (though with some reservations) that George Călinescu become his counterpart at the Modern Literature Department. This proposal was vetoed by government overseers, who viewed Călinescu as politically suspect, and Simonescu retained that chair as well, as a substitute. Cartojan's death in 1944 left Simonescu in charge of another project, namely the publication of works by Kogălniceanu. He was also the sole editor of an addendum to (or fourth volume of) Bibliografia românească veche. The book was completed under duress, with Simonescu showing up for work at the academy throughout the air raids on Bucharest; though commended for the effort, he was criticized by classical scholar Nestor Camariano for not including a number of works, such as Rigas Feraios' maps of the Principalities.

The turn of tides on the Eastern Front saw the scholar's brother Constantin killed in action during Operation Little Saturn of late 1942. In August 1944, Antonescu was deposed by coup, and Romania was placed under a Soviet occupation. In February 1945, Simonescu was lecturing at the newly formed Romanian Society for Friendship with the Soviet Union (ARLUS) of Bucharest, discussing Dimitrie Cantemir's activity in the Russian Empire. That August, ARLUS' Iași chapter hosted his presentation of Nikolai Spathari, a Moldavian soldier and geographer in service to the Tsardom of Russia. He continued to publish articles, including, in 1946, one detailing the spread of Baltasar Gracián's El Criticón in 18th-century Moldavia. He was elected a regional delegate of the Democratic Students' Front, and, at a congress held on June 18, 1946, joined the national executive board of the Union of Teachers' Syndicates. By October 1946, Simonescu had set up a private school for boys in Bucharest, called "Mihail Kogălniceanu High School". Exactly a year later, during the Week of Romanian–Soviet Friendship, he spoke at ARLUS' library on Calea Victoriei about the Soviet tradition in book editing "for the masses". Also then, he and Sergiu Calmanovici co-authored and published secondary-school textbooks for both Romanian and French.

During the early stages of Romanian communism, Simonescu focused mainly on his work as a bibliographer. As recalled by Anghelescu, who was at a time a student of literature, the senior scholar had been barred from teaching by the communist censors—a lesser punishment than those reserved for other specialists, whose work was entirely purged from academia. By January 1948, he had joined the Social Democratic Party, and was writing for its journal, Viitorul Social. From 1947, he was employed by the Education Ministry's Study Offices, and by February 1948 was collecting statistical data from the various schools. That year, a book collection put out by Vatra magazine hosted his edition of Kogălniceanu's "social writings". In his introductory study, Simonescu explained that this was a spin-off from Cartojan's own Kogălniceanu corpus, which, he argued, had neglected the Kogălniceanu's social directives. He was moved to Iași University Philology Section where, in February 1949, he and Alexandru Dima established a study circle which took inspiration from Soviet historiography. As noted in 1977 by Ursu, the "demands of the cultural revolution in our country" also led Simonescu to participate in popular education, with lectures at the Bucharest people's university. His works of the time include a May 1951 article which discussed the governing Workers' Party as depicted "in new works of folk literature". He made returns to his native area (by then included in Argeș Region), and in 1953 stayed with teacher Vasile Marin at Mușătești.

=== Recovery ===
Simonescu was chief scientific researcher at the Nicolae Iorga Institute of History from 1952 or 1953. During that same period, he was also a staff educator at the Technical School for Librarians. His position at Iași was filled by a former student, and personal friend, I. D. Lăudat. In 1955, Simonescu curated Kogălniceanu's selected works for the Biblioteca pentru toți collection, with a preface which depicted the author "as a thinker of progressive outlook, who never went down the reactionary path taken by the bourgeoisie". Simonescu also edited an edition of Kogălniceanu's literary essays and articles, which came out in 1956 as Despre literatură. This contribution was noted for featuring works that had only ever seen print in their Cyrillic version. In mid-1957, he was allowed to publish in the historical magazine Studii și Materiale de Istorie Modernă, earning praise for putting out Kogălniceanu's first-ever complete bibliography. Another one of his work traced Kogălniceanu's role in establishing the modern Romanian lexis. It was panned by linguist Ion Gheție, who argued that Simonescu had merely put together a collection of words which modern Romanian never adopted, such as "ill-adapted neologisms" and samples of Kogălniceanu's preference for the Moldavian dialect. Also according to Gheție, Simonescu was poorly familiarized with historical grammar, and "seems to confuse literary language with the Muntenian dialect".

In 1958, Simonescu was in correspondence with G. T. Kirileanu, a former librarian of the royal court, who was asking him to look after books he had donated to the academy. As argued by historian Constantin Prangati, the Kirileanu–Simonescu exchanges show that the latter formed part of a clandestine intellectual network, also including Constantin C. Giurescu, Traian Herseni, Iorgu Iordan, Simion Mehedinți, as well as others. These "supported national culture, defending the Romanians' language and history, while maintaining faith in the arrival of better times". Simonescu made another celebrated return in 1960, when he described the late-16th-century chronicle of Balthasar Walther, a hitherto ignored historical source on the reign of Michael the Brave. As noted by scholar Andrei Oișteanu, Simonescu paid service to the communist habit of avoiding discussion about Jews and antisemitism in Romania. In his Walther edition, he "expunged—by replacing it with dots—the [...] passage" which detailed how Michael "had all the Jews murdered, who, according to their custom, as they were wont, conducted themselves as traitors to the country." This act of self-censorship caused some controversy in later decades, since reference works preserved the text in Simonescu's version.

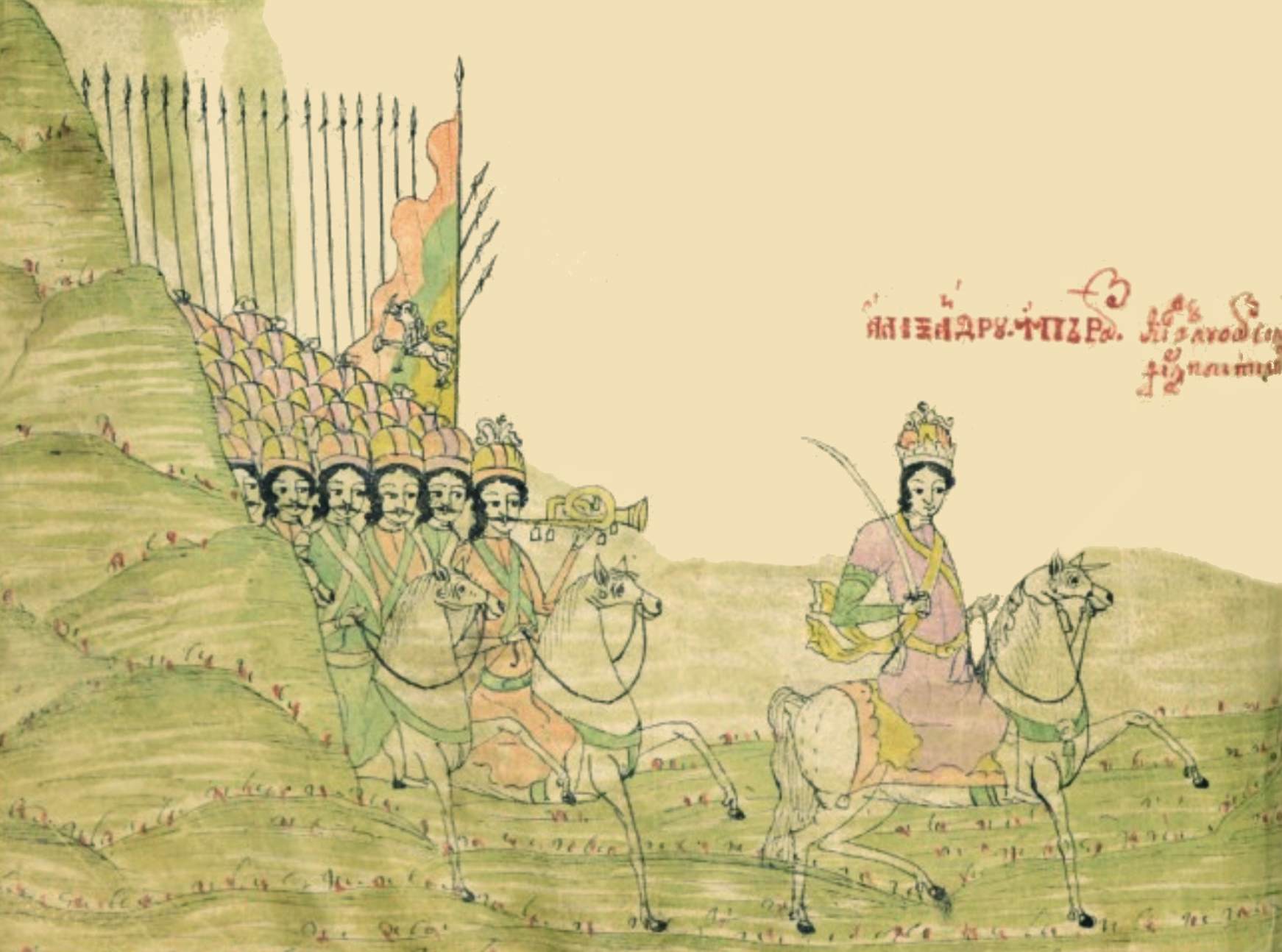
Alexander the Great leading his cavalry into battle. Scene from Năstase Negrule's illuminated version of Alixăndria, 1790

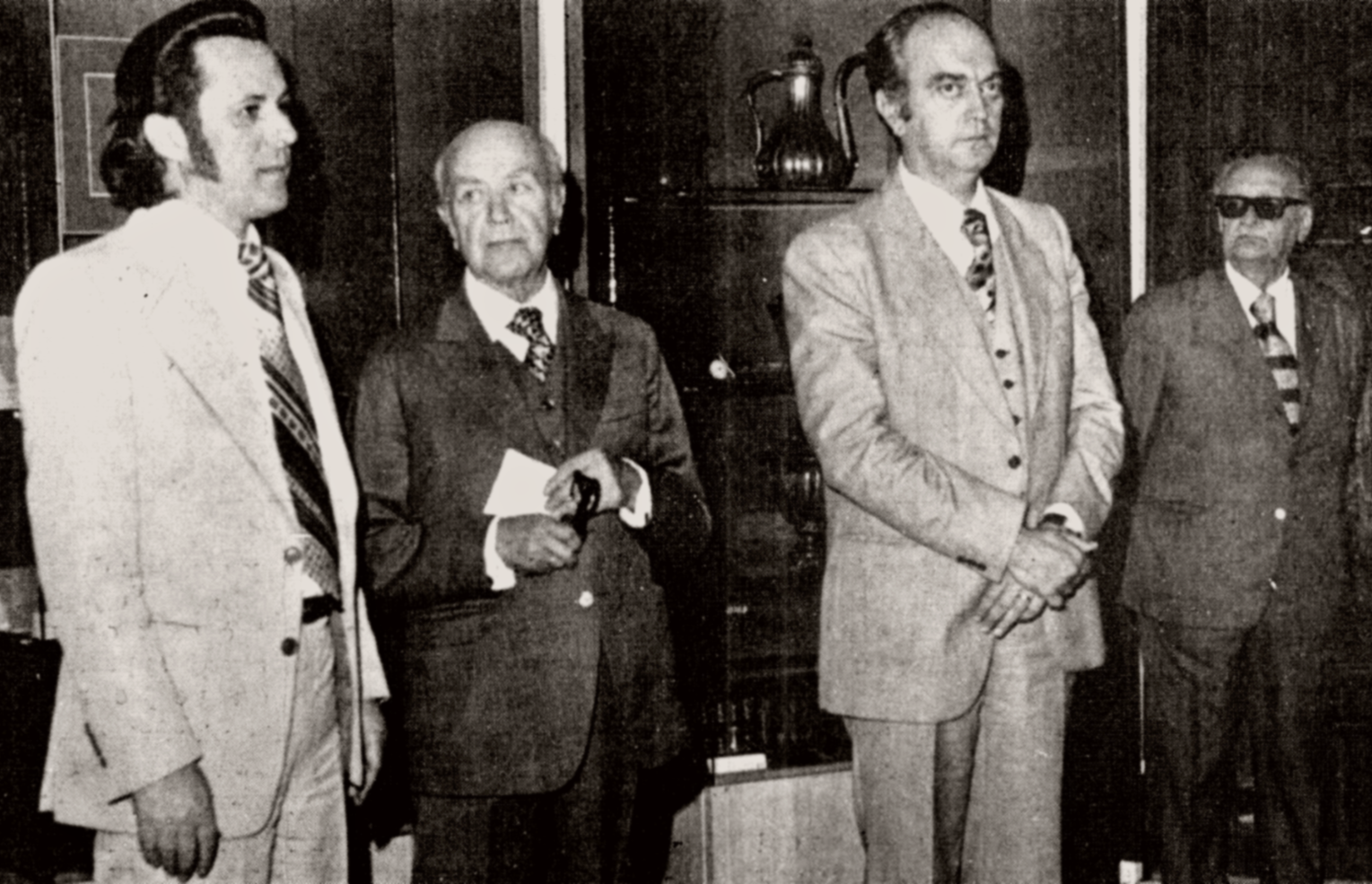
Simonescu (second from the left) with fellow literary historians Al. Oprea, Dan Grigorescu and Șerban Cioculescu at a Museum of Romanian Literature exhibit, October 1978

Academic Alexandru Niculescu argues that, by the mid-to-late 1960s, with the communist regime signaling an interest in "recovering the literary inheritance", Simonescu and Chițimia, as well as Iordan, Lăudat and Alexandru Piru, could hope to restore Cartojan's legacy in letters. In 1961, on behalf of the academy, he and Constantin Grecescu published a critical edition of the late-17th-century chronicle known as Letopisețul Cantacuzinesc. The regime awarded him recognition as a docent of philological science in 1962, as well as a position on the Romanian association for Slavic studies. A professor at the Bucharest Pedagogical Institute from 1963 (where he also led the librarians' association), Simonescu was then granted his own chair at the university—holding it from 1968 or 1969 until retirement in 1972. He was again becoming noted for his dedication in researching old Romanian literature, including for his 1966 overview of literary contributions by Anthim the Iberian and his 1967 work in French, for the Studia et Acta Orientalia, constituting an overview of Arabic and Karamanli books issued in Wallachia.

Simonescu kept in touch with the Romanian-born Eric Tappe, who headed the UCL School of Slavonic and East European Studies in England. Tappe also put him in contact with his British student, Dennis Deletant, who writes: "Dan Simonescu taught me most of what I know about early Romanian culture. Without the guidance given by both these gentlemen [Tappe and Simonescu], I would not have had the linguistic and cultural background to develop my studies." Simonescu was rated among the "prestigious researchers" by Piru, in 1970, and by bibliographer G. Pătrar as "the most reputable connoisseur of old books", in 1971. His other area of expertise remained mid-19th-century literature, and in particular Kogălniceanu, whose complete works he now helped edit. As literary critic Ion Simuț cautions, Simonescu actually shared credit with a team of historians, including Alexandru Zub and Dan Berindei, but was widely regarded as a "coordinator of sorts" after prefacing the first Kogălniceanu volume, in 1974. Zub himself credits Simonescu for at least the first volume in that collection.

Simonescu reported that the year 1963, with its "professional and didactic necessities", had forced him to prioritize "bibliological science", which he viewed as a companion to literary history. However, he returned as an anthologist that same year, publishing Cărțile populare ("Books of Folk Literature"), with Chițimia as his co-editor. This contribution was followed in 1965 by his own Romanul popular în literatura română medievală ("Folk Novels in Medieval Romanian Literature"). Here and in other works, Simonescu advanced his vision of romances such as Alixăndria and Esopia as the basis of lay Romanian literature, while also criticizing Cartojan's belief that the Principalities were always indebted and peripheral to Greek literature. In that context, Simonescu was researching the work of a Greek chronicler, Matthew of Myra, as read through its Romanian translation. In a French-language article published in 1966, he posited that Matthew's translator was Axinte Uricariul, himself the author of a Romanian chronicle.

=== Later life ===
From 1965, Simonescu was welcomed into the Writers' Union of Romania (USR), a member of its Literary History and Critique Section. One year later, he wrote and published Cronici și povestiri românești versificate ("Romanian Chronicles and Stories in Verse"), which included detail on the mourning song for Constantin Brâncoveanu and its transition into Wallachian folklore. The 1967 collective volume Studii de folclor și literatură ("Studies in Folklore and Literature"), appearing at Editura pentru Literatură, featured his contributions, alongside those of Giurescu, Ernest Bernea, Eugeniu Sperantia, Henri H. Stahl, and Eugen Todoran. Also noted for his editorial work on manuscripts left by Constantin Cantacuzino, in 1969 he attended a colloquium at the University of Padua, presenting the results of his finds from Cantacuzino's personal book collection. His work as a bibliographer also produced a specialized textbook, put out by Ștefan Gheorghiu Academy in 1967.

In the early 1970s, Simonescu and Victor Petrescu worked on inventorying the book collections of Târgoviște, creating a catalogue for the city's Museum of Old Books. Also located there, the Romanian Association of Bibliophiles elected him as its honorary president in 1972. In 1971, Bucharest University's yearbook hosted his overview of Constantin Karadja, who had died in 1950, and whom he introduced as a "great Romanian bibliologist"; that same year, he introduced a brochure on Kirileanu's collection of antique books. He was also focusing his attention on the Western European manuscripts preserved by the Batthyaneum of Alba Iulia, which he precisely dated. In 1973, he put out an album on the Codex Aureus of Lorsch, followed in late 1976 by another such work on the Codex Burgundus. Romanul popular and Cronici și povestiri were followed in 1976 by a textbook, Teoria bibliografiei ("A Theory of Bibliography", 1976). The first book of its kind in Romania, it was followed by Simonescu's similarly pioneering biblioteconomy textbooks for high school.

In 1980, Simonescu put out a complete bibliography of Cartojan's scholarship. In parallel, he directed Alexandru Chiriacescu and Dan Zamfirescu, who were contributing new editions of Cartojan's interwar books. In 1981, Simonescu and Gheorghe Buluță co-wrote Pagini din istoria cărții românești ("Pages from the History of Romanian Books"), which advanced the claim that "Romanian incunabula" existed as books printed by Transylvanians or "Dacians" active in Western Europe before 1500. Around the time of his eightieth birthday in 1982, Simonescu was active in the USR, and sent by this body as a representative in regional meetings—at Câmpulung, Constanța, and in various villages of Teleorman County. He was additionally a contributor to Manuscriptum journal, where, in early 1983, he defended his 1940s Bibliografia in a polemic with fellow scholar Paul Cornea. He declared his disappointment that, rather than being reprinted in Romania, this work had been reissued by a "famous American publishing house", and from Liechtenstein; he also urged the authorities to invest more resources in the literary education of Romania's high-school students.

Another selection of Simonescu's various articles was published in 1984 at Editura Eminescu, as Contribuții: literatura română medievală ("Contributions: Medieval Romanian Literature"). The work received a prize from the Bucharest Writers' Association. It was noted by Păcurariu for its musings on the history of Romanian pedagogy and public speaking, as well as for its "very important study" on early Romanian prosody—with focus on rhyming chronicles by anonymous historians, seen in a "large comparativist framework". Simonescu was also involved with editing a Kogălniceanu reader for schoolchildren, which came out at Editura Albatros in 1987. In 1988–1990, Simonescu and Florin Rotaru coordinated a specialized class for antiquarian booksellers. Held at Dalles Hall of Bucharest, it had topical contributions by various guest speakers, including Buluță, artist Marcel Chirnoagă, and historian Ludovic Demény. The scholar also made a return to folkloristics with an introductory study to Rădulescu-Codin, published in 1986 as part of Editura Minerva's folk-literature reader (Literatură populară). He was at the time living in Bucharest, but corresponding with his various pupils and disciples. As he noted in his correspondence, his re-familiarization with Muscel's traditions required him to read the works of Mihail M. Robea; he also relied on biographical material sent to him by Ion Cruceană of Pitești.

After the Romanian Revolution of 1989, and precisely on his ninetieth birthday (December 11, 1992), Simonescu was elected an honorary member of the academy. The day was marked by the new political establishment, with President Ion Iliescu sending him a congratulatory message. Simonescu was still regularly writing at the time, and had prepared for print a paper on Ovid Densusianu; as argued by Anghelescu, his work in comparative literature had reached its peak with additional studies on 18th- and 19th-century translators, from John Caradja to Cezar Bolliac, as well as with his opening up discussions about Western influences on 17th-century Romanian culture. Another contribution was his preface to Virgil Olteanu's handbook of bibliology, which came out later in 1992. His death, which took place on March 10, 1993, in Bucharest, interrupted his work on the Kogălniceanu corpus. It was continued on his behalf by Georgeta Penelea Filitti. Simonescu, Buluță and Iurie Colesnic are also credited as the authors of Scurtă istorie a cărții românești ("A Short History of the Romanian Book"), put out by Editura Demiurg in 1994.
