= Valea Făgetului River =

Valea Făgetului River may refer to the following rivers in Romania:

- Valea Făgetului, tributary of the Misir in Bihor County
- Valea Făgetului, tributary of the Strei in Hunedoara County

== Other ==
- Valea Făgețelului River

== See also ==
- Făget River (disambiguation)
- Făgețel River (disambiguation)
- Fagu River (disambiguation)
- Fagu Roșu River (disambiguation)
