= Ioan Bianu =

Romanian philologist and librarian

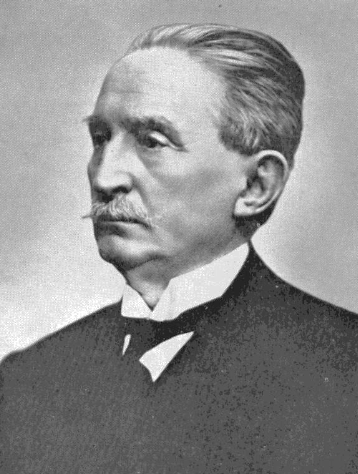
- Photograph of Bianu, ca. 1920
- Born: 1856 or 1857; Făget (Oláhbükkös), Transylvania, Austrian Empire
- Died: February 13, 1935 (aged 78–79); Bucharest, Kingdom of Romania
- Resting place: Bellu Cemetery, Bucharest
- Other names: Ion Bianu, Ion Frunză

Academic background
- Influences: Timotei Cipariu, Bogdan Petriceicu Hasdeu, Émile Legrand, Ioan Micu Moldovan, Émile Picot

Academic work
- Era: 19th and 20th centuries
- Main interests: Library and information science; Bibliography; Romanian literary history; Paleography
- Influenced: Alexandru Rosetti, Radu R. Rosetti, Dan Simonescu

Ioan or Ion Bianu (1856 or 1857^{[a]} – February 13, 1935) was an Imperial Austrian-born Romanian philologist and bibliographer. The son of a peasant family from Transylvania, he completed high school in Blaj, where he became a disciple of Timotei Cipariu and Ioan Micu Moldovan. As a youth, he espoused Romanian nationalism, and came into conflict with the Austro-Hungarian authorities, before finally emigrating to the Romanian Old Kingdom in 1876. There, he attended the University of Bucharest, later joining the faculty, where he taught Romanian literary history. He was affiliated with the Romanian Academy Library for over half a century, transforming the institution from the meager state in which he found it, and overseeing a five-fold increase of its collection. He helped author two important multi-volume works detailing early books and manuscripts from his country, and was a founder of library and information science in his adoptive country. Near the end of his life, struggling with deafness, Bianu withdrew from the Library in favor of his friend Radu R. Rosetti, but went on to serve as president of the Romanian Academy.

Bianu's scholarship was doubled by his work as an organizer in the field, and, especially after 1880, by a participation in political intrigues. He was a disciple of Dimitrie Sturdza, joining the latter's National Liberal Party and canvassing support in academia. Bianu continued to agitate among the Transylvanian Romanians, but, by 1896, both he and Sturdza had turned moderate on the national issue, and favored a rapprochement with Austria-Hungary. As such, Bianu was a "Germanophile" during World War I, meaning that he criticized Romania's alliance with the Entente Powers. He remained in German-occupied territory following the fall of Bucharest, but was spared persecution upon the end of war.

== Biography ==
=== Beginnings ===
The future scholar was born in Făget (Oláhbükkös), a village east of the Transylvanian town of Blaj (on the southern border of Kis-Küküllő County from 1876, and nowadays in Alba County). His parents, Grigore and Anica (née Popa), married in 1855; it was Grigore's second marriage. The couple had two sons and three daughters, all of whom survived into adulthood. The Bianu family was an old peasant one of some means, the village a small Romanian one on a hillside. Living in proximity to the spiritual center of the Romanian Greek-Catholic Church in what was then the Austrian Empire, they belonged to that faith. Bianu was taught reading and writing by his grandfather, then attended primary school in his native village. His father understood the importance of schooling, even if this implied material sacrifices, and the boy studied for nearly a decade at the gymnasium and the Romanian high school in Blaj. When he arrived in 1868, the local atmosphere was uncertain and marked by the faculty's activism against the recent Austro-Hungarian Compromise, which consecrated Transylvania part of the Hungarian Crown, against Romanian demands.

While Bianu was a student there, Timotei Cipariu was at the height of his career. He lived with one of his teachers, Ioan Micu Moldovan, who helped provide for his daily needs and with whom the former pupil kept touch until the teacher's death in 1915. It was in Moldovan's home that Bianu's interest in old Romanian books was first awakened, and he recalled in later years how he was treated there like a son. In 1875–1876, Bianu joined the student literary society and contributed to its magazine, Filomela; he also served for a while as school librarian. One of his final acts at the school was to participate in an annual demonstration of the May 1848 assembly on Câmpia Libertății. This was the last such gathering, as the Hungarian authorities banned them henceforth.

Bianu graduated in 1876, in the same class as his cousin Vasile Bianu, the future physician and political figure. Bearing a recommendation from Moldovan for August Treboniu Laurian, Ioan left for Bucharest, capital of the Romanian Old Kingdom; four classmates joined him in emigrating. Laurian, supported by the poet Gheorghe Sion, obtained him a post as assistant at the Central State Library. He was thus able to support himself until 1880 while attending the literature and philosophy faculty of the University of Bucharest. In early 1879, he was named archivist and librarian of the Romanian Academy. Notoriously thrifty, he lived on the Romanian Academy Library grounds, downtown Bucharest, where he also raised cows.

In 1881, he won a competition to become professor of Romanian language and literature at Saint Sava National College. Later that year, with the help of his former professor Bogdan Petriceicu Hasdeu, he received a scholarship to study Romance philology in Milan and Paris. His teachers included several of Hasdeu's personal friends, the Slavists Vatroslav Jagić, Louis Léger, and Graziadio Isaia Ascoli. He also met the Romanist Émile Picot, took courses with Gaston Paris, but the lasting impact of his sojourn lay in the eye-opening visits to libraries. Impressed by the Palazzo Brera, the Biblioteca Ambrosiana, libraries across Italy, the Bibliothèque nationale de France, the British Museum and the Bodleian Library, he at the same time became keenly aware of the poor state of Romania's libraries and gathered ideas for their improvement.

After returning home in 1883, he became assistant professor at the University of Bucharest's department of Romanian literature. He still made visits abroad: in 1885, he spent time in Galicia-Lodomeria, researching the Jagiellonian Library for Romanian-related subjects, the Ossoliński archive at Lemberg, and the Dosoftei fund at Schowkwa. Upon his own request, he was also sent to Minsk Governorate, Russian Empire, where he researched the Radziwiłł collection at Nesvizh Castle. He was hosted there by Antoni Wilhelm Radziwiłł, who allowed him to copy some 300 documents, and befriended his young daughter Elżbieta, later wife of the Count Potocki.

=== Professor and National Liberal agent ===
Upon his return to Bucharest in June 1886, Bianu married Alexandrina Băicoianu, described by his friend Sextil Pușcariu as a "brilliantly spiritual" woman, and was thus received into the Bucharest upper-class. As noted by social historian Lucian Nastasă, this move also ensured Bianu more recognition as a scholar, as well as access to politics—through Băicoianu, he was now related to historian Alexandru D. Xenopol and politician Nicolae Xenopol. The couple were Pușcariu's godparents upon the latter's own wedding, in September 1905.

In 1888, Bianu began his collaboration with Hasdeu's neoromantic literary review, Revista Nouă. He contributed the book review column, as well as a biography of the writer Gheorghe Asachi. Elected a corresponding member of the academy in 1887, he was elevated to titular status in 1902. After losing the Romanian literature chair to Ovid Densusianu in 1901, in 1902 Bianu became the titled holder of the Romanian literature history professorate at the university. He was later also elected dean of the literature faculty. In addition to such work, in 1904 he served on a panel of inquiry created by the Ministry of Education, closing down the Notre-Dame de Sion schools, accused of forcefully converting Orthodox students to Catholicism.

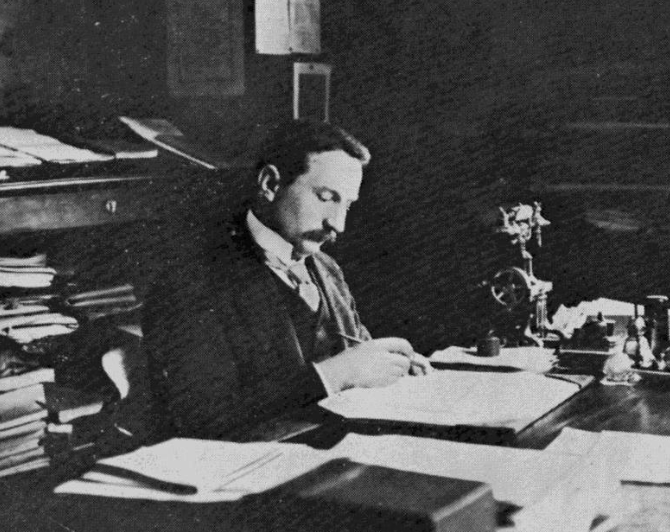
Bianu at his Romanian Academy Library desk, ca. 1900

Meanwhile, a member of the National Liberal Party (PNL) and auditor of its Bucharest club, Bianu was an ally of Dimitrie Sturdza and reached the Assembly of Deputies. Without serious ambitions in this realm, he preferred to be a sort of éminence grise to the party leader. From as early as 1887, he interceded between Sturdza and PNL-friendly academics, including the Slavist Ioan Bogdan, obtaining their support against rival Conservatives, and helping them travel for specialization abroad. In 1892, a favorable review he penned for Revista Nouă helped Bogdan win a professorship. However, Bianu preserved links with the Conservatives' literary club, Junimea, which he frequented as an outside guest in the 1880s. He also frequented Conservative clubs in Western Moldavia, befriending the moderate Conservative Radu Rosetti—and then his young son, Radu R. Rosetti. The two politicians discussed issues on bipartisan policies, and even conspired to remove incompetent administrators of either hue from their offices. He and Hasdeu also persuaded Radu Sr to start his work as a social historian and theorist, and afterward helped him to find employment as an archivist. According to Nastasă, Bianu, allegedly the lover of Sturdza's wife Zoe, was an expert at maneuvering the "levers of power", and presided upon his own "clique".

Bianu was initially an orthodox Romanian nationalist, campaigning for unity between Romania and his native Transylvania. During the early 1880s, when Sturdza served as Academy president, Bianu returned to Blaj, hoping to persuade Cipariu to resume his contacts with the academy. Cipariu objected, mainly because of his dislike for Hasdeu and his conflict with Laurian. In 1892, Bianu joined the executive committee of the Cultural League for the Unity of All Romanians and began sending out sponsorships to the leaders of the Transylvanian Memorandum protest movement. During the backlash, Bianu was sent by Sturdza to assist Eugen Brote and other exiled Memorandists at Milan. His plan to resettle the participants in various European countries was nevertheless seen as "downright absurd" by its intended beneficiaries, who preferred to stand trial. Bianu's own stance on Transylvania changed over several years. In 1896, with Sturdza as Prime Minister, Bianu participated in the rapprochement with Austria-Hungary. During the state visit to Romania of Emperor Franz Joseph, Sturdza sent Bianu, Grigore Antipa, Ștefan Sihleanu and Barbu Ștefănescu Delavrancea to Vârciorova, where they were to meet Austrian delegates ahead of the Cultural League, which sent protesters. The two Romanian delegations clashed which each other, an incident which was reported with amusement in the Bucharest press.

Bianu continued to work for the Bucharest National Liberal club during the next decade, helping Sturdza win over Junimea from the Conservatives. During the elections of 1905, he backed the Junimist candidate Titu Maiorescu and, in return, obtained Junimea's support for the National Liberal Petru Poni. Bianu and Poni remained close friends for the rest of their lives. Bianu also used his influence for advancing many other scholarly goals, such as when, in 1909, he brought to Romania Ramiro Ortiz, who founded the Bucharest school of Italian studies. In parallel, Bianu preserved links with the Romanians living in Russia's Bessarabia Governorate: through his correspondence with Ștefan Ciobanu, he was informed of Russification in that province. As Ciobanu wrote in one of his replies, the books sent by Bianu would help reverse the trend:

Long live Bianu, and may you keep serving the Romanian people in building its future. [...] Now I myself read and understand well the Romanian literary standard, albeit I cannot write in it as well as I do in Russian. With my Russian-language education, I acquired the habit of thinking in Russian. The time will come will speak my my Romanian as easily and as freely as I do my Russian."

=== Wartime ===
During the earliest stages of World War I, with Romania still cautiously neutral, Bianu also took a neutralist attitude. Historian Nicolae Iorga, who was president of the Cultural League, noted that Bianu, unlike Sturdza, did not wish to see Romania committed to the Central Powers. This was because "he resented us fighting alongside the Hungarians, who never ever had any other objective but to crush us." However, Bianu was also one of the Transylvanians and minority-PNL members who also rejected proposals to join the Entente Powers. Among these "Germanophiles", Bianu stood out for speaking out against the project to occupy Transylvania from Austria-Hungary with Entente support. In August 1914, using the pen name Ion Frunză, he published the essay Pentru lămurirea situației. Cuvinte către români ("Making Things Clear. An Address to the Romanians"). This work, soon after translated into German, argued that the Entente was a cover for Russian imperialism, Pan-Slavism, and the "Turanic hordes"; he decried the persecution of Romanians in Austria-Hungary, but noted that they all fared much better than the Romanians living under Russia's rule in Bessarabia. This view was instantly supported by the sociologist Dimitrie Gusti, who suggested that "Frunză's admirable work" should be published "in millions of copies, so that every Romanian will read it".

Eventually, in autumn 1916, a PNL cabinet and King Ferdinand I announced Romania's support for the Entente; Romanian troops briefly entered Transylvania, but Romania was in turn invaded by the Central Powers. Bianu stifled his opposition, but did not openly criticize all the Central Powers. In September, shortly after the Battle of Turtucaia, he penned in Viitorul an article specifically targeting the Kingdom of Bulgaria and the Bulgarians in Romania, whom he called "venomous snakes". According to historian Lucian Boia, this is "possibly the most anti-Bulgarian writing ever published in Romanian"; "Bianu says nothing about the Austro-Hungarians or Germans, as if Romanians had only been at war with the Bulgarians in 1916!"

The Romanian army and administration headed for Western Moldavia: Bianu's son Alexandru was drafted, but, according to his adversaries, spent the war in relative safety at Bârlad, shying away from active duty. Also controversially, Bianu Sr chose not to join the exodus, and remained with the Germanophiles and neutralists in occupied Bucharest, to 1918. He noted that he watched on, "eyes flooded in tears", as the German Army marched through the streets. One of ten academicians to remain behind, he ensured that the Academy Library continued to function in relatively normal terms, refusing to publish under the occupation regime, but also collaborating with the occupier to at least some degree.

Bianu's letters of the occupation are a primary source for the activities of Germanophiles such as Antipa, Petre P. Carp, Alexandru Al. Beldiman, Alexandru Tzigara-Samurcaș, and Iacob Negruzzi. Bianu sided with Carp in his critique of PNL politics, but, unlike him and Beldiman, did not call for the dethronement of King Ferdinand. He also refrained from signing up to Carp's openly pro-German platform. Nevertheless, he was remembered by the anti-Germanophiles for participating at banquets hosted by the puppet governor, Lupu Kostaki. The Austro-Hungarian Army also asked Bianu to vouch for officer Alexandru Leca Morariu, who was accused of being secretly a Romanian nationalist agitator.

Romania conceded defeat in May 1918, and the academy could resume work in Bucharest under a German-friendly Conservative regime, with Alexandru Marghiloman as Prime Minister. In October, Bianu joined his returning peers and reported on the damages incurred during the previous years. He scandalized public opinion further after ordering public mourning at the academy after the death of a pro-Austrian cleric, Vasile Mangra. The loyalist government was fully restored in Bucharest within a month, following the unexpected defeat of Germany, which led to the establishment of Greater Romania—which included united Transylvania from December 1, 1918. As noted by the Gemanophile diarist Gala Galaction, Bianu was morose during these events: labeled a "traitor to his people", he "never rejoiced that Transylvania had united with us". Later that month, Prime Minister Ion I. C. Brătianu was welcomed by the academy. According to the now-disgraced Marghiloman, his supporters were either barred from attending or, in Bianu's case, silenced. In this new climate, Bianu was investigated by an academy commission as a wartime collaborator in March 1919, but refused to present himself for questioning. As he put it, the group investigating him only relied on cut-outs from the anti-Germanophile press.

=== Final years ===
In May 1919, Bianu joined efforts with Iorga and other pro-Entente academicians in order to obtain the international recognition of Romania's new borders. However, they failed to convince Foreign Affairs to sponsor their diplomatic correspondence with Western European academies. Although he was mentioned by name and castigated in the academy commission report of July 1919, Bianu suffered no further consequences. In September 1919, Bianu was the official rapporteur assessing whether Alexandru Davila's play, Vlaicu Vodă, was worthy of an academy prize; he deemed it unsuitable, after noting that Davila did not adhere to the verified historical narrative. He joined the Transylvanian-based Romanian National Party (PNR) ahead of the November 1919 election, taking a seat in the Assembly for Târnava-Mică County. Three years later, a conflict erupted between King Ferdinand and the PNL, on one side, and the PNR, on the other. At core was the issue of Transylvanian autonomy. Bianu used his intermediary position to negotiate a PNR presence at Alba Iulia, where Ferdinand crowned himself King of Greater Romania, but was unable to convince Alexandru Vaida-Voevod.

Bianu's time was divided between Bucharest and Predeal, where, in 1912, he had built himself a villa. From c. 1909, his wife had fallen ill and was hardly ever seen in public. Their son Alexandru studied law in Paris and returned to Romania in 1923 to work as a bank clerk, before finally joining the diplomatic corps and serving as commercial attaché in London. In 1924, Bianu helped organize Romania's first national congress of librarians, and later that year founded the country's first librarians' association, alongside a Romanian Practical School of Archival Science, modeled on the École Nationale des Chartes. He was also unusually selected by Aristide Blank's publishing house, Cultura Națională, to oversee a collection of Romanian city monographs.

During his final years, Bianu declared his dissatisfaction with the "exclusivist-repulsive individualism" in Romanian academic life, describing it as an "evil" influence. In June 1925, he was forced to announce that the academy had a 90% deficit and was cutting back on expenses. He continued to intervene politically for his various protegés, including the literary critic Gheorghe Bogdan-Duică and the linguist Theodor Capidan, and steered the career of philologist Alexandru Rosetti. In June 1926, Bianu and his cousin Vasile returned to Blaj for the Cultural League Congress, presided upon by Iorga. He also reluctantly presented himself as a candidate for the post of academy president, but lost by a large margin to Emil Racoviță.

By then, Bianu had expressed his dislike of Italian fascism, and, as a consequence, the Italian authorities passed him over for awards and distinctions. In April 1928, during his last months at University, he seconded Rector Ermil Pangrati in urging government to dissolve the antisemitic Union of Christian Students, which was causing disturbances and riots; this stance was contrasted by Vasile, who, as a member of the Senate, argued that Romanian Jews sympathized with Hungarian irredentism. His teaching hampered by a progressive deafness, which had begun much earlier in life, Bianu withdrew from the university in mid 1928, resigning his seat to his disciple, folklorist Dumitru Caracostea. The previous year, Caracostea had contributed to a Bianu Festschrift, alongside Iorga, Pușcariu, Alexandru Rosetti, Vasile Bogrea, Nicolae Cartojan, Charles Drouhet, and Petre P. Panaitescu. Although he had inaugurated a project to design a new Library building, Bianu ultimately resigned his position there in early 1931, assigning his seat to Radu R. Rosetti. At the time, he announced that he also had kidney disease and rheumatism.

Made secretary general of the academy in 1927, Bianu was elected as its president on June 1, 1929. An early admirer and political ally, geologist Ludovic Mrazek referred to Bianu as a force of professional conservatism, one of several "decent men and sincere patriots" who stood up to intellectual fads. In January 1932, the new king Carol II made Bianu a Knight of the Order of the Crown. The following month, on behalf of the Romanian Academy, Bianu and Gheorghe Țițeica began corresponding with the Soviet Academy of Sciences—part of a larger effort to bring about a détente in Romanian–Soviet relations. He resigned later that year, but continued to serve as vice president to his death. During his final months, he intervened in the dispute between Iorga and Hungarian archivist Endre (Andrei) Veress, persuading the latter not to escalate the conflict.

A widower since December 1929, Bianu died in his Bucharest home on February 13, 1935, after an episode of uremia. His body was laid in state at the academy, and the Faculty of Letters marked the occasion by suspending courses for the day. He was buried alongside Alexandrina Bianu in Plot 54 of Bellu Cemetery. In his obituary piece, the Cultural League's Iorga referred to Bianu as "the Academy's titular god". Bianu's personal book collections, comprising some 1,400 volumes, was bequeathed to the Academy Library. According to journalist Dan Ciachir, Bianu himself continued to be regarded as a minor figure in Romanian culture until the early 1980s, when another journalist, Leon Kalustian, made efforts to reassess his discreet contributions.

== Work ==
Bianu's Documente de Artă Românească din Manuscripte vechi ("Romanian Artifacts in Old Manuscripts", 1922)

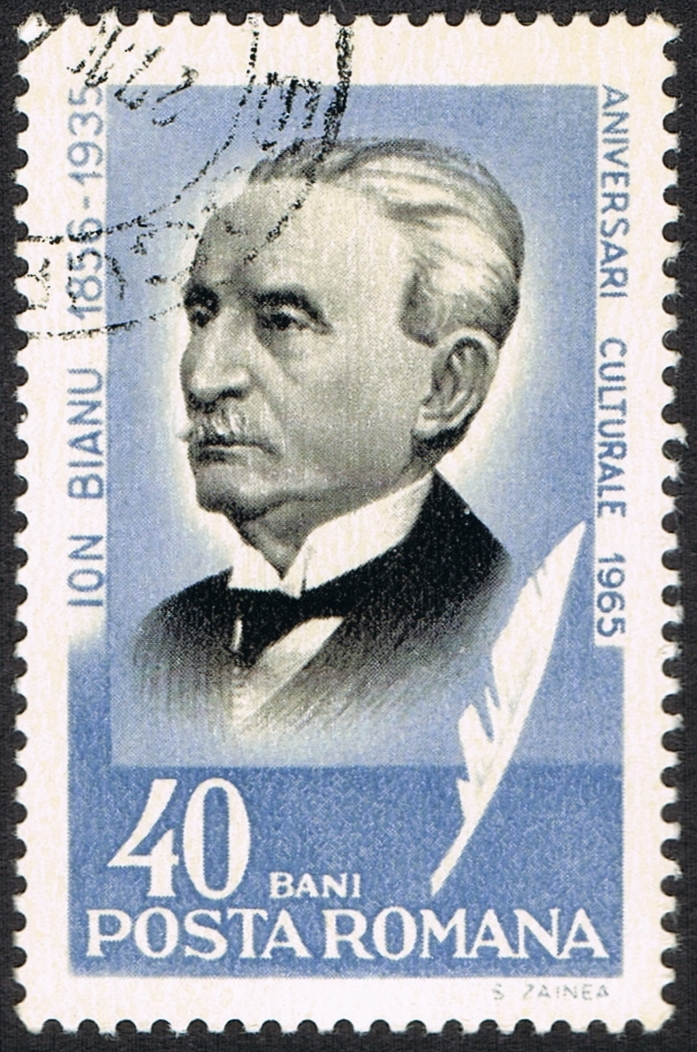
1965 postage stamp commemorating three decades since Bianu's death

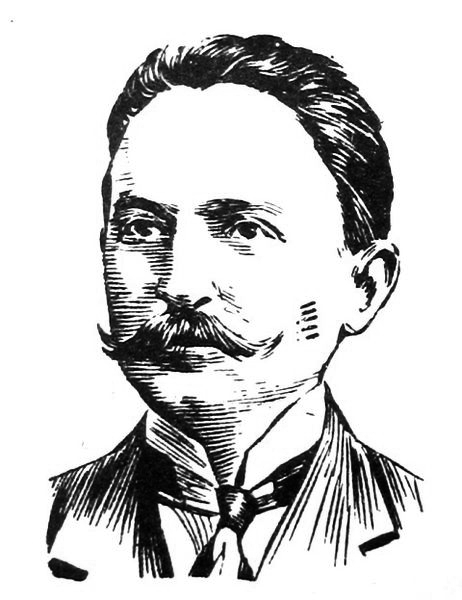
Posthumous etching of Bianu

Encouraged by Alexandru Odobescu, Ion Ghica and Sturdza, who inspired in him an appreciation for books and libraries, Bianu renounced the idea of a scientific career in favor of working as a librarian. His first publication, in 1876, was a monograph on Samuil Micu-Klein. When he entered the Academy Library in 1879, the beginning of a 56-year affiliation that would end with his death, the institution had 6,000 donated volumes; by 1885, there were 30,000 and its formative phase was complete. In 1895, he started a bibliographic office at the library that through 1925 would attract the efforts of the country's scholars interested in creating a general bibliography of Romanian culture.

Under his leadership, the need for additional research tools became apparent. He helped counter the lack of manuscripts, old books and documents on the language and national history by initiating an ample campaign for identifying and donating such materials. He ensured that the Academy Library became the National Library and helped merge the Central State Library into this institution in 1901, later folding in a number of private libraries. He pushed for an 1884 law mandating printing presses to send two copies of everything they printed to the Academy Library, and was behind improvements to the law in 1904. Also that year, he became one of the main proponents of reforming the Romanian alphabet, but later declared himself against "excessive phoneticism", standing up to reformists such as Simion Mehedinți. During the war, he and Ioan Bogdan reported trying to rescue the Library's Church Slavonic corpus from confiscation by the Bulgarian Armed Forces.

Bianu authored a number of works on philology as well as history, particularly cultural history. Thoroughly familiar with old Romanian literature, he authored two books that remain valuable reference works. The first was the monumental Bibliografia Românească veche (1508–1830). Covering four volumes (1508–1716, 1716–1807, 1808–1817 and 1817–1830), it was written in collaboration with Nerva Hodoș and later Dan Simonescu. First suggested to Bianu by Émile Picot, it was conceived as a coherent and pan-Romanian project, supplanting earlier catalogues by Vasile Popp and Cipariu. As an analytical work, it was also based on Émile Legrand's Bibliographie hellénique ou description raisonnée des ouvrages publiés par des Grecs au XVIIIe siècle.

The books it encompassed were published in the Romanian lands during this period in Romanian, Slavonic, Greek and even Georgian, by both Romanians and foreigners; it also included books published abroad by Romanians. Publication began in 1903 (preceded by early drafts from 1898), took a nearly two-decade hiatus after Hodoș' death in 1913, and resumed once Simonescu joined the project in 1931. It was completed after Bianu's death, in 1944. Likened to George Călinescu's history of Romanian literature, although more historic in aspect, it was the country's most ample bibliography at the time, praised by Iorga for its completeness. It was however criticized by later bibliographers, and by Bianu himself, for being inconsistent and incomplete in its selection or presentation of titles. The work covers 1,526 known books and 300 unknown works, going up to 2,024 with addenda and errata.

Part of the preparation involved the 1898 press publication of an appeal for old books, in which priests, teachers, professors and others who owned or knew of books printed between 1508 and 1830 were asked to inform the library of their existence and if possible loan them. The appeal was accompanied by a list of 621 titles of known books in this category; its author was particularly interested in books not on the list. Bianu's call was received with particular enthusiasm in Transylvania. His former teacher Moldovan emerged as a steady collaborator, not only facilitating access to his library and Cipariu's diocesan collection, but also providing valuable advice over the years. In his turn, Moldovan sent a letter to the province's Greek-Catholic clergy, asking them to supply information about the rare books in their parishes, and Bianu soon received 140 responses regarding books that were not on his initial list.

Bianu's other key work was the three-volume Catalogul manuscriselor românești din Biblioteca Academiei, written with two other authors and published between 1907 and 1931. Bianu published a number of other books on early Romanian literature as well as textual editions, including Psaltirea Scheiană and, in 1924, the newly discovered Codicele de la Ieud. His close analysis of manuscripts and contributions to paleography through his study of the Romanian Cyrillic alphabet identify him as a historian; he also involved himself in disputes with Slavists over the publishing of historical sources—whether they should follow the interests of linguists or cater to historians. From 1926, he organized bibliophile exhibits at the Bellu House, on Academy grounds. Additionally, Bianu was responsible for Creșterea Colecțiunilor, the academy's bibliographic periodical, which between 1906 and 1929 chronicled the publications received by the library. His colleagues there included Ilarie Chendi, Septimiu Albini, Alexandru Sadi-Ionescu, Vasile Pârvan, Alexandru Lapedatu, George Giuglea, George Murnu, Nicolae Cartojan, Alexandru Obedenaru, Constantin Moisil, and Ioachim Crăciun.

== Notes ==
=== Footnote ===
His date of birth is usually given as September 8 or October 1, 1856, although it is possible he was born in 1857; a date of February 20 has been proposed. Bianu himself stated he was born in 1856.
