= Fagu (disambiguation) =

Fagu was a poetry genre in early Gujarati literature.

Fagu may also refer to:

- Besim Fagu (1925–1999), Albanian footballer
- Erbim Fagu (born 1987), Albanian footballer

== See also ==
- Fagu River (disambiguation)
- Fagus (disambiguation)
