= Gheorghe Bogdan-Duică =

Imperial Austrian-born Romanian literary critic (1866–1934)

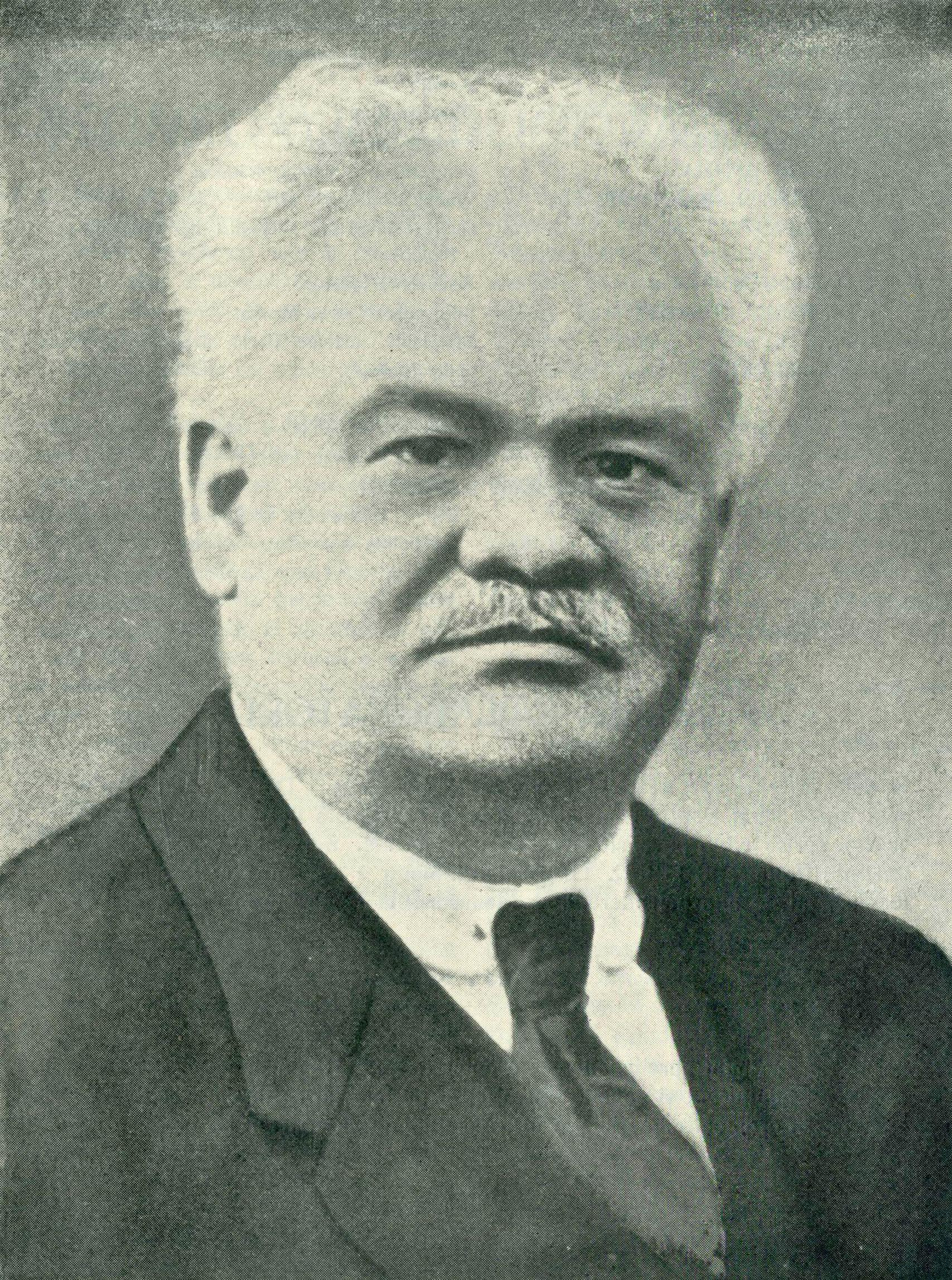
Gheorghe Bogdan-Duică

Gheorghe Bogdan-Duică (born Gheorghe Bogdan; January 2, 1866 [O.S. December 21, 1865]–September 21, 1934) was an Imperial Austrian-born Romanian literary critic. The son of a poor merchant family from Brașov, he attended several universities before launching a career as a critic, first in his native town and then in Czernowitz. Eventually settling in Bucharest, capital of the Romanian Old Kingdom, he managed to earn a university degree before teaching at a succession of high schools. Meanwhile, he continued publishing literary studies as well as intensifying an ardently nationalistic, Pan-Romanian activism. He urged the Romanian government to drop its neutrality policy and enter World War I; once this took place and his adopted home came under German occupation, he found himself arrested and deported to Bulgaria. After the war's conclusion and the union of Transylvania with Romania, he became a literature professor at the newly founded University of Cluj. There, he served as rector in the late 1920s, but found himself increasingly out of touch with modern trends in literature.

== Biography ==
=== Origins, education and early career ===
He was born in Brașov, in the Transylvania region. His father Ioan (1832–1906) was a struggling small businessman who was forced to liquidate his store, leave his family, and become a clerk in Sinaia, in the Romanian Old Kingdom; by the late 1880s, he was at a glass factory in nearby Azuga. His mother Elena (née Munteanu; 1846–1911) raised seven boys and four girls. The oldest son, Ioan Bogdan, would become a historian and philologian. Four of the sons earned university degrees, while a sister, Ecaterina, married Nicolae Iorga in 1901. Gheorghe Bogdan attended Romanian-language elementary and high school in his native city; his teachers at the latter institution included Ioan Meșotă, Ioan Alexandru Lapedatu, and Andrei Bârseanu. He graduated in 1885, and obtained a scholarship for the University of Budapest, where he remained a year. He transferred to the University of Jena, where he studied philosophy, and then took courses at the University of Vienna from 1887 to 1888. He started publishing criticism at an early age in the Romanian-language newspapers of Transylvania. After his studies abroad, he worked for Gazeta Transilvaniei and then for the Sibiu-based Tribuna; his beginnings as a critic coincided with the early career of George Coșbuc, whom he helped with numerous reviews. He prided himself on being an intellectual disciple of Titu Maiorescu, and was writing for the latter's Convorbiri Literare by 1888. In the autumn of 1889, he was named a part-time teacher at the high school he had attended, but was soon fired after a conflict with the administration caused by his quick temper. While in Brașov, he frequently attended social gatherings for the young Romanian women of Brașov, where he delivered public readings and sought to awaken the participants' interest in literature.

Subsequently entering the Austrian province of Bukovina, he settled in its capital of Czernowitz (Cernăuți), where he edited Gazeta Bucovinei from May 1893 to August 1894 and sought to raise popular interest in Romanian writers in a province that was fairly disconnected from the cultural life of the Old Kingdom. While there, he published a biography of Petru Maior in 1893, and in 1894 translated Ion Budai-Deleanu's German-language notes on Bukovina into Romanian. Also that year, he wrote a study of the Romanian Orthodox Church's autonomy in the province; while in 1895, he published a volume on Bukovina that was the first to closely analyze its economic, cultural and political profile. Commenting on contemporary literature, he offered favorable reviews for Coșbuc, Barbu Ștefănescu Delavrancea, Ioan Slavici, and Alexandru Vlahuță, citing them as examples of a national and original literature. He then returned to Transylvania, focusing on the area's history and writing books on Visarion Sarai and on the interrogation of Inocențiu Micu-Klein (both 1896), as well as on the demographic situation of Romanians in Hungary in 1733. Other subjects of his biographies included Gheorghe Lazăr, Eftimie Murgu, and Simion Bărnuțiu.

While in Transylvania, he once again worked for Tribuna and formed part of Astra's leadership until August 1897. He then enrolled in the University of Bucharest, located in the capital of the Old Kingdom, where he finally earned a degree in literature in 1897. For political reasons, but also because Bucharest was far closer to his native city than Budapest, where he also might have chosen to live, he remained there for a period of time following his graduation. From Bucharest, he was one of the chief contributors to Tribuna. His objectives included making the reading public aware of important literature published in the 1880–1888 period; sharply criticizing the pseudo-celebrities of the day; and especially the popularization of aesthetic writings such as Gotthold Ephraim Lessing's Laocoön and Hippolyte Taine's The Philosophy of Art, which had both recently appeared in translation. He also returned to teaching in 1897, first offering German courses in Curtea de Argeș and then moving to Focșani and Galați. By 1899, he was desperate to relocate to the capital, with its rich institutions, worldly attractions, and diverse population. He wrote from Focșani asking his mentor Ioan Bianu to intervene on his behalf with Education Minister Spiru Haret. He was duly appointed to Bucharest's Dimitrie Cantemir High School, where he taught from 1899 to 1909, and finally ended his high school career at Mihai Viteazul High School in the same city, from 1909 to 1919. He eventually became director of the latter institution.

=== Political involvement ===
Continuing to live in Bucharest in the early years of the 20th century, he was associated with the traditional conservative circles of Junimea and Iorga. By 1899, together with Coșbuc, Iorga, Ion Luca Caragiale, and Ovid Densusianu, he was among the contributors to România jună. He wrote an ample number of literary studies and made significant contributions to the history of 19th century Romanian literature. Reviews that published his work included Convorbiri Literare, Sămănătorul, Ramuri, and Viața Românească in the Old Kingdom, as well as Transylvanian outlets such as Luceafărul and Tribuna Poporului. Some of these studies, such as a 1906 analysis of literary historiography, methodically analyzed their subject. Others investigated foreign influence on native writers, and included a 1901 book on German influence during the time of Budai-Deleanu, a 1904 study of Salomon Gessner in Romanian literature, a work on the sources of Vasile Alecsandri from the same year, a 1905 look at Friedrich Schiller's local influence, and a commentary on August von Kotzebue's Romanian translators. He usually shed new light on Romanian writers' lives and works, drawing on old magazines and gazettes, contemporary accounts, and the authors' correspondence.

Together with Ioan Russu-Șirianu, he established the Cultural League for the Unity of All Romanians in 1891. He was a member of the "Tribunist" wing (so called after Tribuna) of the Romanian National Party (PNR), which strongly supported publication of the Transylvanian Memorandum. Particularly through his writings in Sămănătorul and Luceafărul, he became associated with a radical nationalist ideology that fit with the two magazines' Pan-Romanianism. An ardent patriot who frequently veered into an exclusivist chauvinism, he published Românismul ("Romanianism") from 1913 to 1914, drawing a contrast between his Pan-Romanian outlook and Pan-Slavism as well as Pan-Germanism. A prominent anti-Semite, he published Românii și Ovreii ("The Romanians and the Jews") in 1913. Upon the outbreak of World War I, together with fellow Transylvanians Octavian Goga and Vasile Lucaciu, advocated for neutral Romania's entry into the war on the side of the Allies. After Bucharest was occupied by the Central Powers in 1916, his loose talk about an impending German defeat led to his denouncement and arrest in early June 1917. Initially held at Săveni, he was taken hostage and deported to Troyan in Bulgaria. Despite his older brother's intercessions on his behalf, he spent nine months in captivity before being freed near the end of the war. Subsequently, he returned to his post of high school director, holding it until November 1919.

=== Postwar period and legacy ===
At that point, following the union of Transylvania with Romania and the creation of the University of Cluj, he was named a professor in the history of modern Romanian literature, proposed by Sextil Pușcariu. He served as dean of the literature and philosophy faculty in 1919–1920, as rector of the university in 1927–1928, and as vice rector in 1928–1929. He never earned a doctorate, although he did supervise numerous dissertations. He was a commander of the Order of the Crown, as well as an Officier de l'Instruction Publique. He became a titular member of the Romanian Academy in 1919. In 1919, at the first election following the union, he was chosen to represent his university in the Romanian Senate as a member of the Peasants' Party. Although he had led the party's Transylvania wing, he resigned during the acrimonious merger negotiations with the PNR, which led to the creation of the National Peasants' Party in 1926. Subsequently, he migrated to the National Liberal Party.

In a 1922 biography of Ion Ionescu de la Brad, he classified the latter as "the first Romanian peasantist", and synthesized his ideas on "progressive agriculture". He wrote a history of modern Romanian literature in 1923; George Călinescu dismissed this as being without aesthetic taste, calling its author "completely misunderstanding and disoriented". As early as 1926, he set himself up as a leading faculty opponent of hiring Lucian Blaga at Cluj, and by the following year, had launched a public campaign, offensive in tone, to discredit the poet. His conservative disposition, stubborn spirit, and scientist and historicist opinions stood in contrast with the poet's mysticism, and his intransigence grew as he aged. By 1931, he was writing a series of defamatory articles called Literatură fără rost (firește de Lucian Blaga) ("Pointless Literature (of Course by Lucian Blaga))", and his death three years later appeared to remove a major obstacle to the hire. According to a later critic, although Bogdan-Duică documented a series of remarkable figures, his cultural references were those of a 19th-century scholar, even though his most important work was written in the 20th century.

Bogdan-Duică suffered from strabismus. In April 1892, at Brașov's St. Nicholas Church, he married Maria Done, a teacher of French from Lutran, Alsace. The couple had six children, just one of whom followed a literary career; their second son was the painter Catul Bogdan. Two of the children predeceased their father, with one dying at age 10. Maria died in 1917, while her husband was imprisoned in Bulgaria. After a relatively short interval, he married Constanța (née Hanea, married Ingescu), who was educated in Sibiu, worked as a teacher in the Old Kingdom, and later headed a kindergarten in Cluj. Chronically poor at managing his money, he nevertheless lived during his Cluj years in a lavish apartment near the city's Central Park that had been requisitioned from a Hungarian owner. In his last years, he built an imposing house in Sibiu, intending to retire there. He died suddenly in a hotel in Brașov, where he was staying as head of a baccalaureate committee; the cause was an aneurysm brought on by diabetes. Taken to Sibiu, where he lay in state in the Astra Palace, his funeral was held at Sibiu Orthodox Cathedral and officiated by Nicolae Bălan. Among the eulogists were Alexandru Lapedatu, Florian Ștefănescu-Goangă, and Nicolae Colan.
