= Făgețel River =

Făgețel River may refer to:

- Făgețel, a tributary of the Bancu in Suceava County
- Făgețel, a tributary of the Camenca in Bacău County

== See also ==
- Făgețel (disambiguation)
- Făget River (disambiguation)
- Fagu River (disambiguation)
- Fagu Roșu River (disambiguation)
- Valea Făgetului River (disambiguation)
