= Făgetu =

Făgetu may refer to several villages in Romania:

- Făgetu, a village in the town of Mioveni, Argeș County
- Făgetu, a village in Gura Foii Commune, Dâmboviţa County
- Făgetu, a village in Gura Vitioarei Commune, Prahova County
- Făgetu, a village in Plopiş Commune, Sălaj County
- Făgetu, a village in Nistorești Commune, Vrancea County

== See also ==
- Făget (disambiguation)
- Făgețel (disambiguation)
