= Vasile Aaron =

Romanian poet and author (1770–1822)

An 1888 copy of Patima și moartea Domnului și Mântuitorului nostru Isus Hristos (Cyrillic: Патіма ши моартеа ДомнȢлȢй ши МѫнтȢиторюлȢй нострȢ ІсȢс Хрістос) in the Romanian transitional alphabet)

Vasile Aaron (Romanian pronunciation: [vaˈsile aˈron]; 1770–1822) was an ethnic Romanian lawyer and poet who lived in the Austrian Empire.

Born in Glogoveț, Alba County, he attended high school in Blaj, followed by Law studies in Cluj. Moving to Sibiu to work as a lawyer, he became known for taking on cases where he defended Romanians. He earned even greater renown thanks to his popular poetry. Among his works are Piram și Tisbe and Narcis (1808), both after Ovid's Metamorphoses; Patimile Domnului nostru Isus Christos (1808), a verse retelling of the Passion of Christ; Leonat și Dorofata (1815), a satirical poem against drunkenness; Anul cel mǎnos (1820), a didactic poem; and Istoria lui Sofronim și Haritei (1821), also in verse. Among the works left unpublished at his death were a translation of Virgil's Aeneid and part of his Eclogues.
