= Fagu Roșu River =

Fagu Roșu River may refer to:

- Fagu Roșu, a tributary of the Senetea in Harghita County, Romania
- Fagu Roșu, a tributary of the Șicasău in Harghita County, Romania

== See also ==
- Fagu River (disambiguation)
- Făget River (disambiguation)
- Făgețel River (disambiguation)
