= Abraham von Franckenberg =

German mystic and writer

Abraham von Franckenberg (24 June 1593 – 25 June 1652) was a German mystic, author, poet and hymn-writer.

== Life ==
Abraham von Franckenberg was born in 1593 into an old Silesian noble family in Ludwigsdorf bei Oels. He attended the Gymnasium in Brieg and the University of Leipzig and looked set to become a lawyer; however, he abandoned his studies in 1617 and was drawn to more ascetic and mystical ideas. By 1622, he was familiar with the works of Jakob Böhme, and he met the mystic in person the following year. Franckenberg would continue to revere Böhme even after the latter's death in 1624, and was a friend to several of Böhme's other followers, such as the Liegnitz physician Balthasar Walther.

He inherited the family estate in Ludwigsdorf in 1623, but passed it on to his brother Balthasar in exchange for the right to keep a few small rooms in the family home. He lived a very reclusive life and rarely ventured forth from this room – only in 1634 to attend to those suffering from plague, and in 1640 to challenge the rhetoric of Georg Seidel, a Lutheran preacher from Oels whom Franckenberg regarded as intolerant.

Tired of this and other confrontations, and mindful of the fact that events of the Thirty Years' War were moving in the direction of Silesia, Franckenberg moved to Danzig via Breslau in 1641, where he lodged until 1649 with the astronomer Johannes Hevelius, who introduced him to Copernican astronomy. He spent the winter of 1642-43 in Holland, where he had several works by Böhme published.

He returned home to Ludwigsdorf in 1649 and, the following year, met Daniel Czepko. He was to read Czepko's Monodisticha in 1652 and wrote two dedicatory poems for it. Around the same time, he met and began to influence Angelus Silesius. He died on 25 June 1652 and is buried in Oels; his gravestone is covered with as yet undeciphered mystical symbols.

== Works ==
His works show ideas drawn from many sources: from the Kabbalah, Paracelsian alchemy, medieval mysticism, the medieval 'heretics' of the Reformation, Spanish sixteenth-century Quietism, Lutheran mysticism and Pansophism. The works themselves are a mixture of ascetic-mystical treatises, such as Schlussreden der Wahrheit (1625), Mir nach! and Vita veterum sapientium (both 1637); others, such as Jordanssteine (1636) challenge orthodox Lutheranism or, as in Oculus siderius, discuss astronomical questions. He had a reputation as an insightful teacher, and the crux of his teachings was the unity with God based on the denial of all things worldly and of the self; particular emphasis was placed on the significance of Christ for the attainment of salvation. Like Jakob Böhme, he juxtaposed the Fall of Lucifer and Adam with attaining his salvation. Grundlicher und wahrhafter Bericht von dem Leben und dem Abschied des in Gott selig ruhenden Jacob Boehmes.

== Raphael ==
Perhaps Franckenberg's most famous work - and certainly his most unusual - is Raphael, Oder Arzt-Engel, first published posthumously in Amsterdam 1676.

The Hebrew name 'Raphael' means 'God has healed'. The archangel Raphael has traditionally been linked with healing and restoration, and it is clear that Franckenberg, in subtitling his manuscript Arzt-Engel ('doctor-angel', a play on Erzengel, 'archangel'), is aware of this fact and wishes to make it clear to his readers. The work, ostensibly a medical tract, draws on both Paracelsian alchemy and Böhmian mysticism. There is also evidence pointing to Franckenberg's interest in the Kabbalah and of links with Rosicrucianism and the ideas of Joachim of Fiore.

== Ancestry ==
Ancestors of Abraham von Franckenberg

16. Johannes gen. Heydan von Frankenberg
8. Hans gen. Heydan von Frankenberg und Ludwigsdorf; (d. 1540, Oels, Silesia)
17. Christine von Walch
4. Wenzel gen. Heydan von Frankenberg und Ludwigsdorf
18. Christoph von Motschelnitz
9. Elisabeth von Motschelnitz
19. Elisabeth von Pritzelwitz
2. Dietrich von Frankenberg und Ludwigsdorf (1565–1633)
5. Salome von Arxleben gen. Magnus
1. Abraham von Fran(c)kenberg (und Ludwigsdorf)
24. Albrecht Bock von Jauer (d. 1546)
12. Georg von Bock und Polach
25. Barbara (Anna) von Nadelwitz (d. 1545)
6. Friedrich von Bock und Polach (1547–1610)
26. Bernhard von Glaubitz
13. Barbara von Glaubitz
27. Margarethe von Falkenhayn
3. Barbara von Bock und Polach (1576–1622)
28. Balthasar von Motschelnitz
14. Balthasar von Motschelnitz
7. NN von Motschelnitz

== See also ==
- Friedrich von Frankenberg (1889-1950)
