= Făgețel =

Făgețel may refer to several villages in Romania:

- Făgețel, a village in Itești Commune, Bacău County
- Făgețel, a village in Frumoasa, Harghita
- Făgețel, a village in Remetea, Harghita
- Făgețel, a village in Dobra, Hunedoara

== Other ==
- Făgețel River (disambiguation)

== See also ==
- Făget (disambiguation)
- Făgetu (disambiguation)
