= Fagus (disambiguation) =

Fagus is the genus of trees commonly known as beech.

Fagus may also refer to:

- Fagus (god), a god of beech trees in Celtic mythology, especially in Gaul and the Pyrenees
- Fagus, Missouri, named for the beech
- The Fagus Factory, a German architectural landmark of 1913
- 9021 Fagus, an asteroid
