= Fagus (god) =

Gallo-Roman deity

In Gallo-Roman religion, Fagus was a god known from four inscriptions found in the Hautes-Pyrénées. The language of this Aquitanian region has been linked to Proto-Basque, rather than to Celtic. Fāgus is Latin for beech.
