= Nicolae Cartojan =

Romanian literary historian (1883–1944)

Nicolae Cartojan (December 4, 1883–December 20, 1944) was a Romanian literary historian.

Born in Uzunu, Giurgiu County, his parents were Anghel Cartojan and Maria (née Petrescu). He graduated from Bucharest's Saint Sava National College in 1902. He then enrolled in the literature and philosophy faculty of the University of Bucharest, where Ioan Bianu was one of his professors, and graduated in 1906. Early on, he developed an interest in early Romanian literature and in researching the manuscripts of the Romanian Academy Library, where he worked from 1906 to 1912. At the same time, he was a teaching assistant. From 1912 to 1914, Cartojan attended speciality courses at Friedrich Wilhelm University in Berlin. Upon returning to Bucharest, he was appointed principal of the Ioan Maiorescu Gymnasium. He married Sevastia Condeescu on April 14, 1916. After Romania entered World War I and the Central Powers occupied Bucharest in December 1916, the gymnasium was turned into a detention camp for Romanian and Russian prisoners of war. Cartojan continued teaching for a while at the Matei Basarab and Gheorghe Lazăr high schools; after being imprisoned for a short time by the occupying forces, he managed to reopen the gymnasium in Giurgiu.

After the war, he obtained in 1920 a doctorate from the University of Bucharest with a thesis about the Alexander romance in Romanian literature (Alexandria în literatura românească. Noi contribuții). The thesis referees were Bianu and Ovid Densusianu, while the chair of the thesis defense committee was Dimitrie Onciul. Cartojan published his thesis in two issues of the Yearbook of the Ioan Maiorescu Gymnasium of Giurgiu, and then more formally with Cartea Românească in 1922. Named an instructor in Bianu's department in 1921, he rose to associate professor in 1923 and, in 1930, was made full professor in the department of the history of early Romanian literature. In 1941, he was elected a titular member of the Romanian Academy.

After a series of preparatory studies, Cartojan published Cărțile populare în literatura românească (vol. I, 1929; vol. II, 1938). This work featured a minute analysis of texts that had almost entirely escaped critical research. Its erudition, sound philological method and meticulousness allowed him to synthesize a vast set of materials dealing with folk books. Its general approach remains valid, and it brought the author an international reputation. He joined the Medieval Academy of America in 1929, worked with Paul Van Tieghem on Répertoire chronologique des littératures modernes and was granted an honorary doctorate by the University of Padua in 1942. The first three of a planned four volumes of Istoria literaturii române vechi, a history of early Romanian literature, appeared between 1940 and 1945. He was the founder of modern research into the field. A high school in Giurgiu was named after him in 1990.
