= Fagu River =

Fagu River may refer to:

- Valea Fagului, a tributary of the Pârâul Roșu in Olt County, Romania
- Fagu or Valea Fagului, a tributary of the Crăiasa in Bihor County, Romania

== See also ==
- Fagu Roșu River (disambiguation)
- Făget River (disambiguation)
- Făgețel River (disambiguation)
