= Făget mine =

Mine in Romania

- Location: Rodna, Bistrița-Năsăud County, Romania
- Products: Lead, Zinc, Copper, Sulfur
- Production: 857 tonnes of lead, 1,038 tonnes of copper, 25,941 tonnes of sulfur and 2,797 tonnes of zinc
- Financial year: 2008
- Opened: 1980

The Făget mine is a large mine in the northwest of Romania in Rodna, Bistrița-Năsăud County, 50 km southwest of Bistriţa and 699 km north-west of the capital, Bucharest. Făget represents one of the largest lead and zinc reserve in Romania having estimated reserves of 9.25 million tonnes of ore grading 0.79% lead and 2.48% zinc thus resulting in 0.07 million tonnes of lead and 0.23 million tonnes of zinc.
