= Valea Lungă, Alba =

Valea Lungă
- Commune
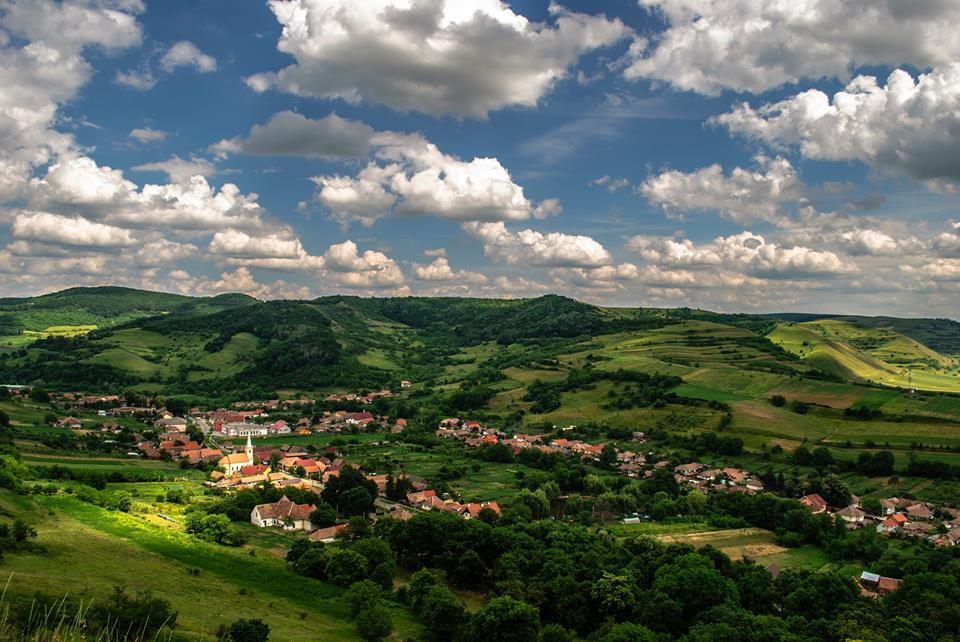

- Location in Alba County

- Location in Romania
- Coordinates: 46°07′30″N 24°02′35″E
- Country: Romania
- County: Alba

Government
  - Mayor (2024–2028): Dan-Florin Aldea (AUR)
- Area: 74.99 km^{2} (28.95 sq mi)
- Elevation: 305 m (1,001 ft)
- Population (2021-12-01): 2,904
  - Density: 38.73/km^{2} (100.3/sq mi)
- Time zone: UTC+02:00 (EET)
  - Summer (DST): UTC+03:00 (EEST)
- Postal code: 517815
- Area code: (+40) 02 58
- Vehicle reg.: AB
- Website: comunavalealunga.ro

Valea Lungă (formerly Hususău; German: Langenthal, Hungarian: Hosszúaszó) is a commune located in Alba County, Transylvania, Romania. Is composed of six villages: Făget (Oláhbükkös), Glogoveț (Kisgalgóc), Lodroman (Lodormány), Lunca (Küküllőlonka), Tăuni (Hosszúpatak), and Valea Lungă.

== Geography ==
The commune lies on the Transylvanian Plateau, at an altitude of 305 m (1,001 ft), in the Târnava Mare meadow. It is located in the northeastern side of Alba County, about 11 km (6.8 mi) southeast of Blaj and 46 km (29 mi) east of the county seat, Alba Iulia, on the border with Sibiu County.

Valea Lungă is crossed by national road DN14B, which starts in Copșa Mică, 24 km (15 mi) to the east, goes through Blaj, and ends in Teiuș, 35 km (22 mi) to the west, where it meets European route E81 and DN1. The Lunca and Valea Lungă train stations serve the CFR main line 300, which connects Bucharest with the Hungarian border near Oradea.

== History ==
Documentary of the existence of the village is available from the beginning of the fourteenth century. A document from 1309 mentioned the existence of an archdeacon in Valea Lungă, and identified Arnold Longavalle as priest of this village.

In the 14th century, the village is also mentioned several times in historical documents. In 1322, Karol Robert, King of Hungary, donated the village of Valea Lungă with the village Micăsasa to Count Nicolaus in Tălmaciu and the villages Pănade and Șona in the Târnava Mică valley. These places belonged to Prince Ladislaus this year which have been taken to infidelity and data Nicolaus. Nicolaus died in 1340 without leaving descendants.

Tomas estate gives its ruler King except of Valea Lungă — this time called "Huziuazo" and Micăsasa village yet the king keeps in its field. Valea Lungă in 1359 is maintained in the royal domain. In 1395, the town was in possession of several nobles, however. It recalls this year of a boundary between the villages and Bălcaciu, Jidvei, and the Valea Lungă nobles here.

Valea Lungă's 14th century Lutheran church is a historic monument.

== Demographics ==
Historical population
Year	Pop.	±%
1850	4,307	—
1910	4,701	+9.1%
1941	5,299	+12.7%
1977	4,878	−7.9%
1992	3,506	−28.1%
2002	3,271	−6.7%
2011	2,907	−11.1%
2021	2,904	−0.1%
Source: Census data

At the 2021 census, the commune had a population of 2,904; of those, 84.44% were Romanians, 7.61% Roma, and 1.1% Hungarians.

== Natives ==
- Vasile Aaron (1770—1822), lawyer and poet
- Vasile Aftenie (1899–1950), auxiliary bishop of the Greek-Catholic Church, titular bishop of Ulpiana, and martyr of the faith
- Ioan Bianu (1856 or 1857–1935), philologist and bibliographer
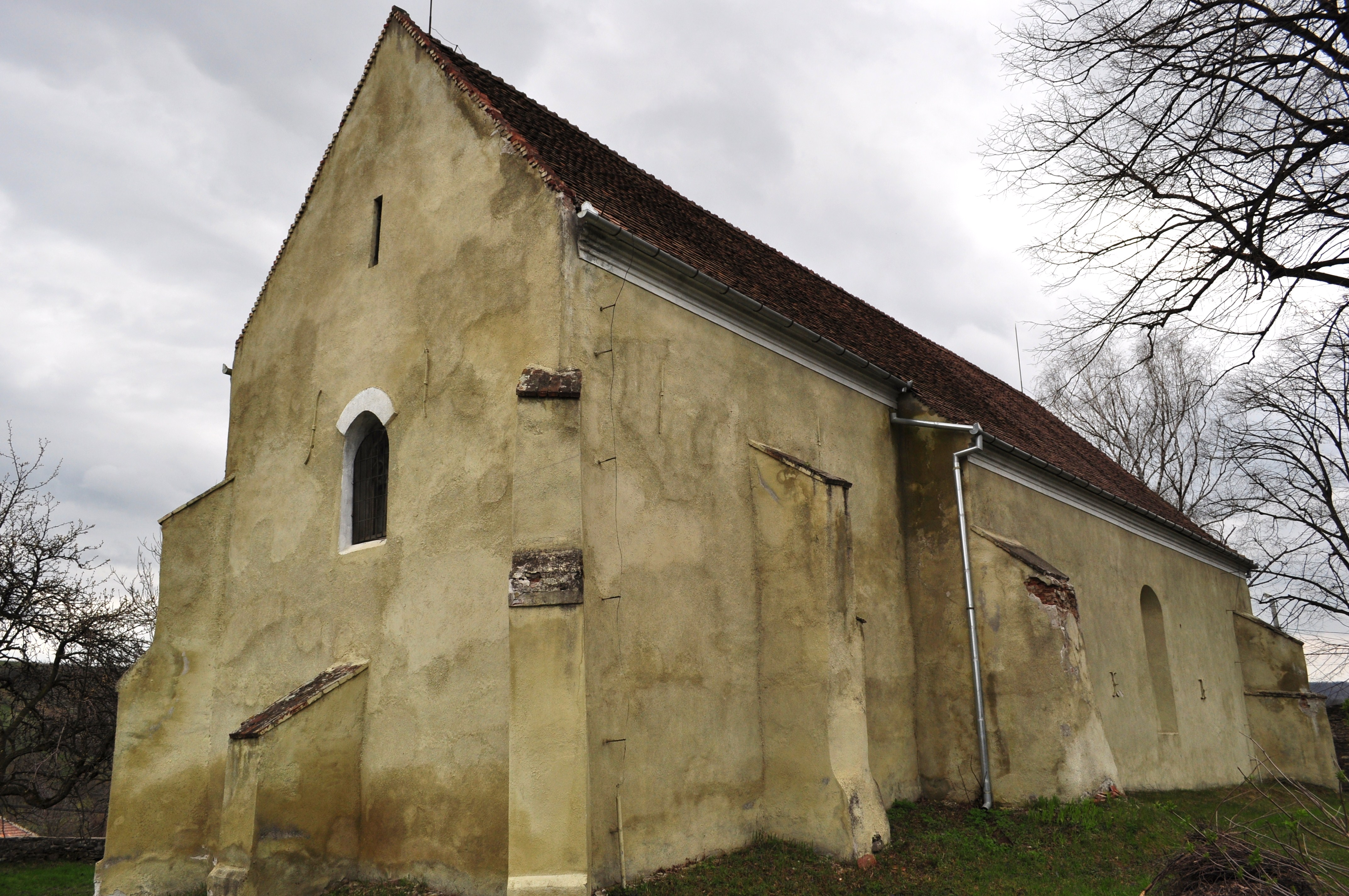
Lutheran church

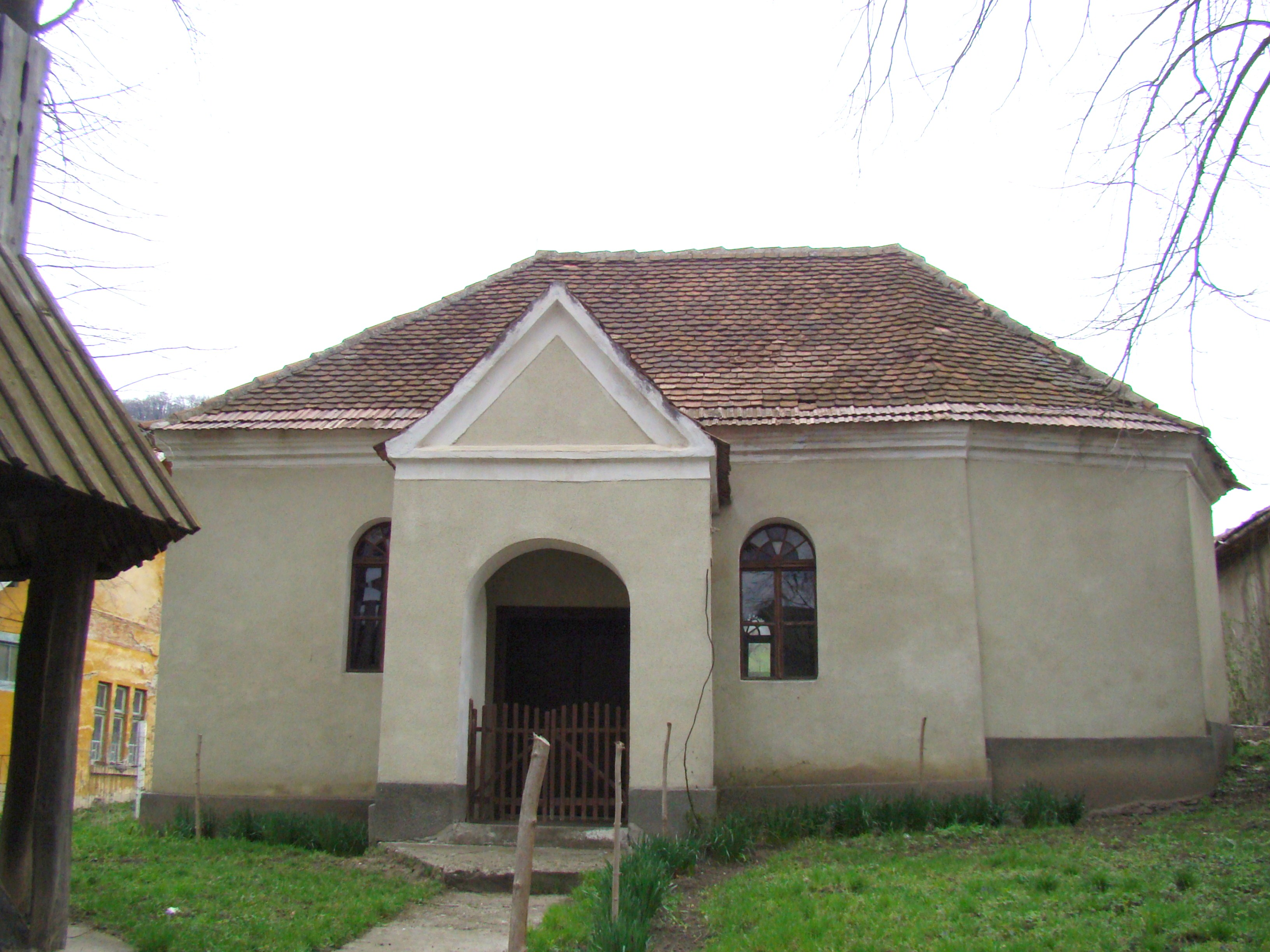
Reformed church (ca. 1780)

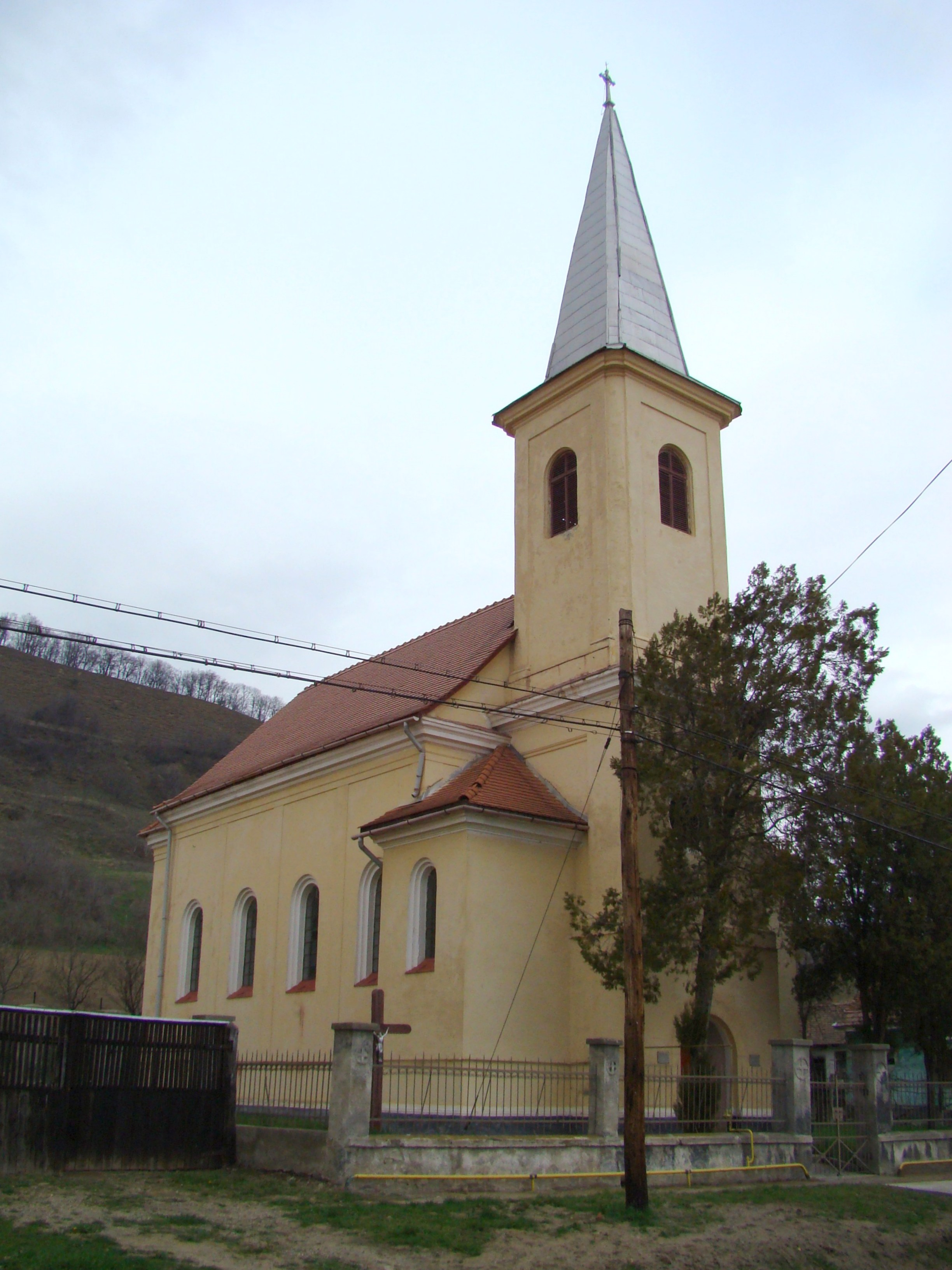
Roman Catholic church

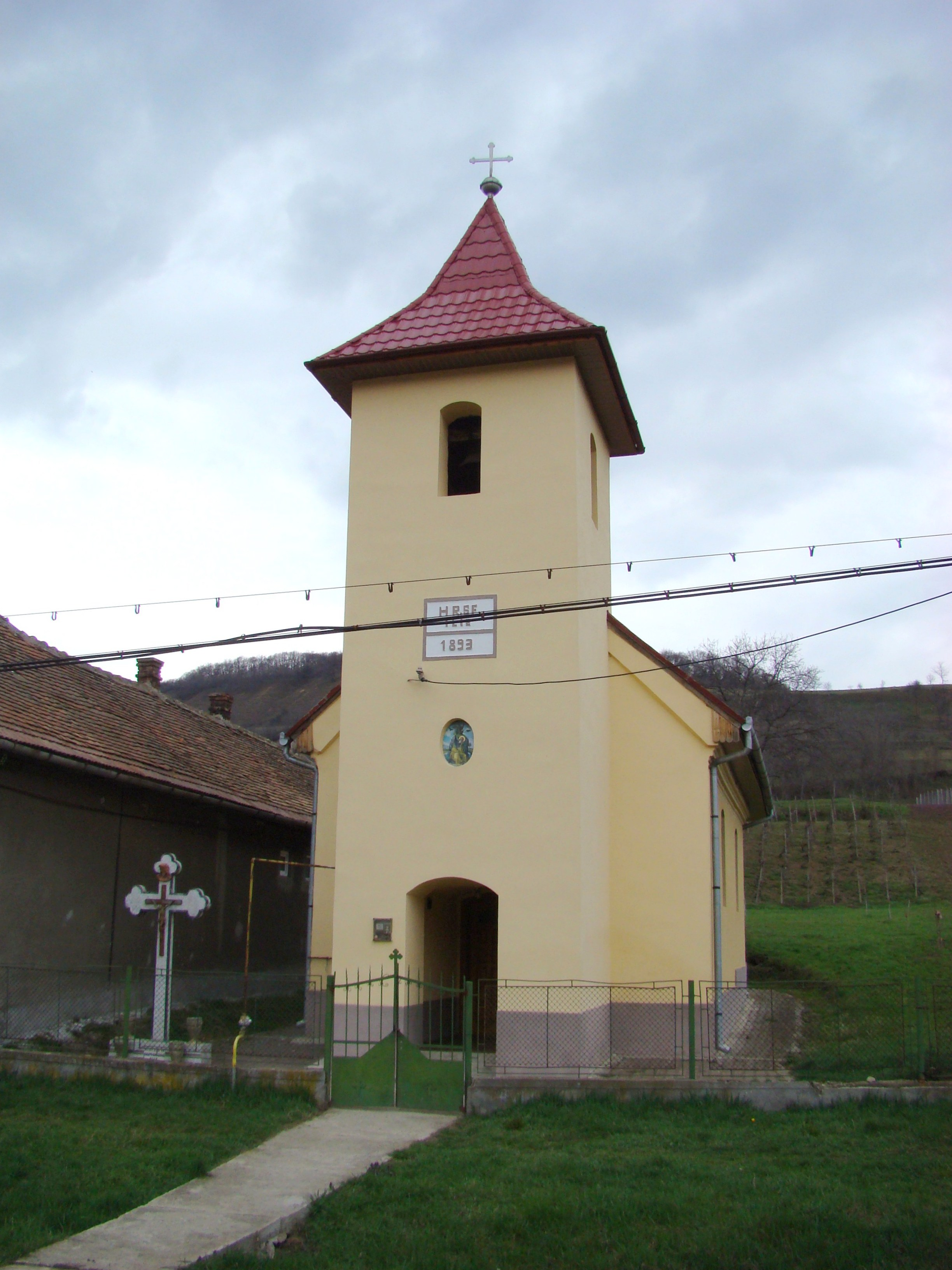
Greek-Catholic church (1893)

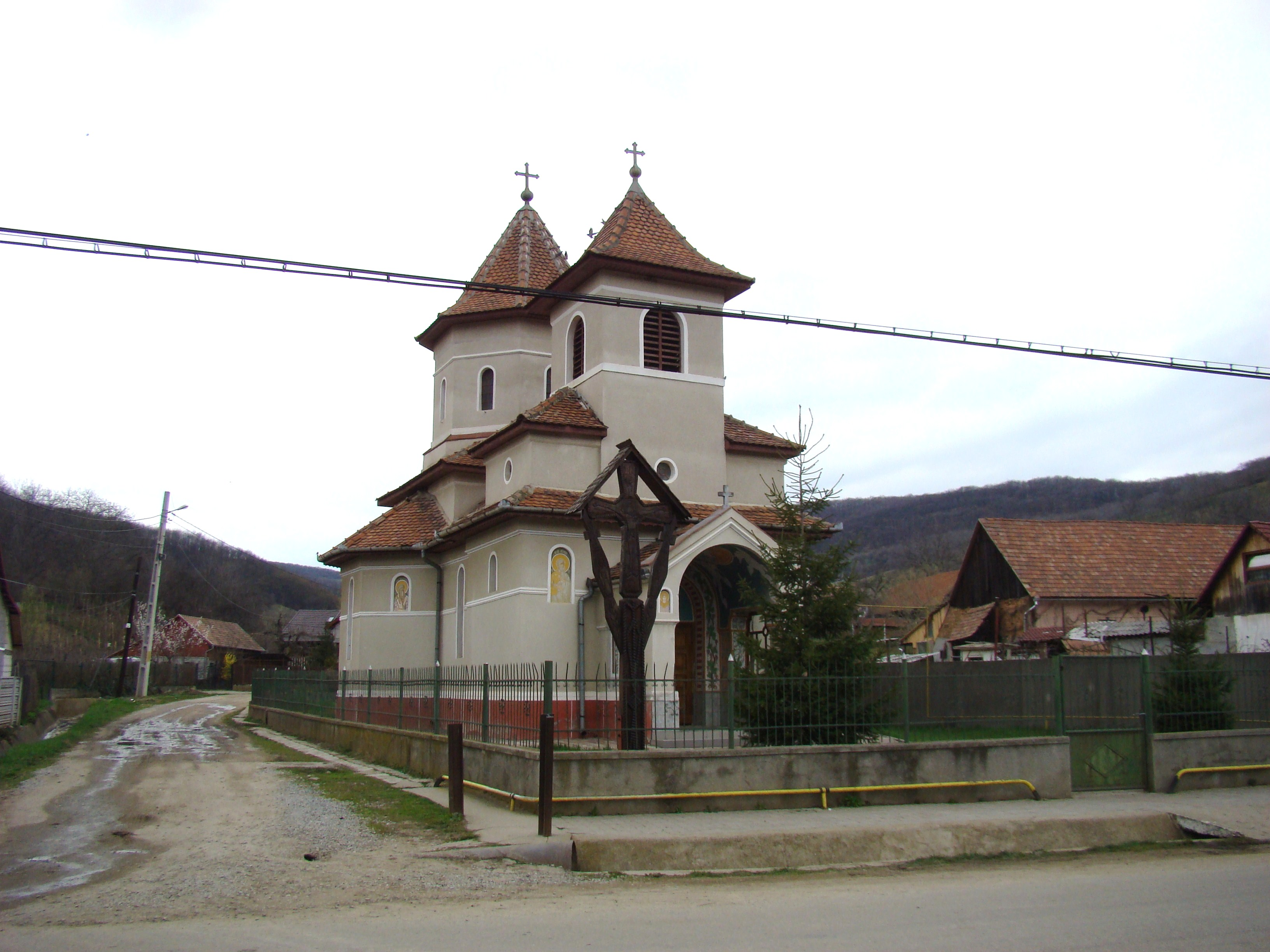
Romanian Orthodox church

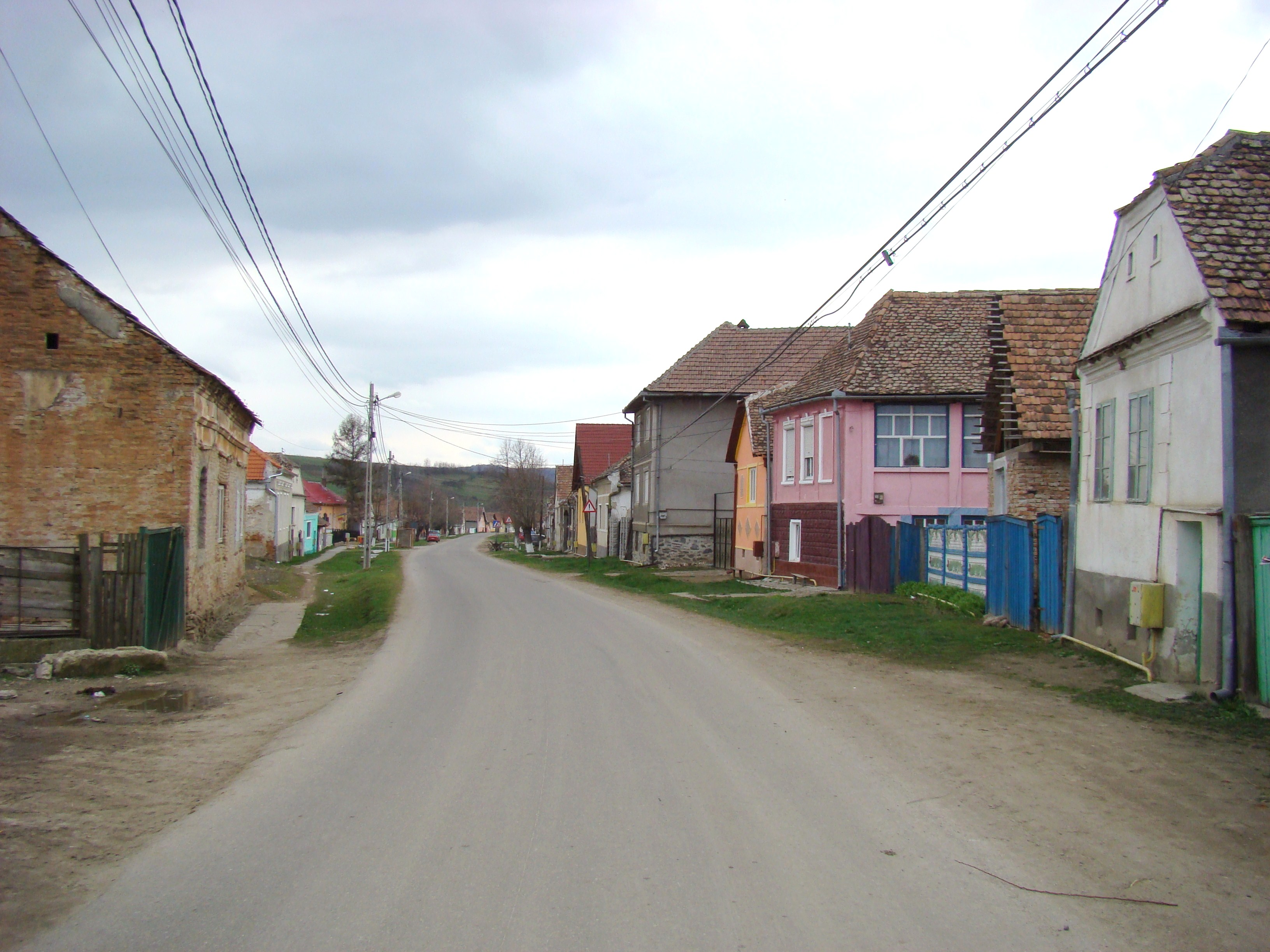
Village road

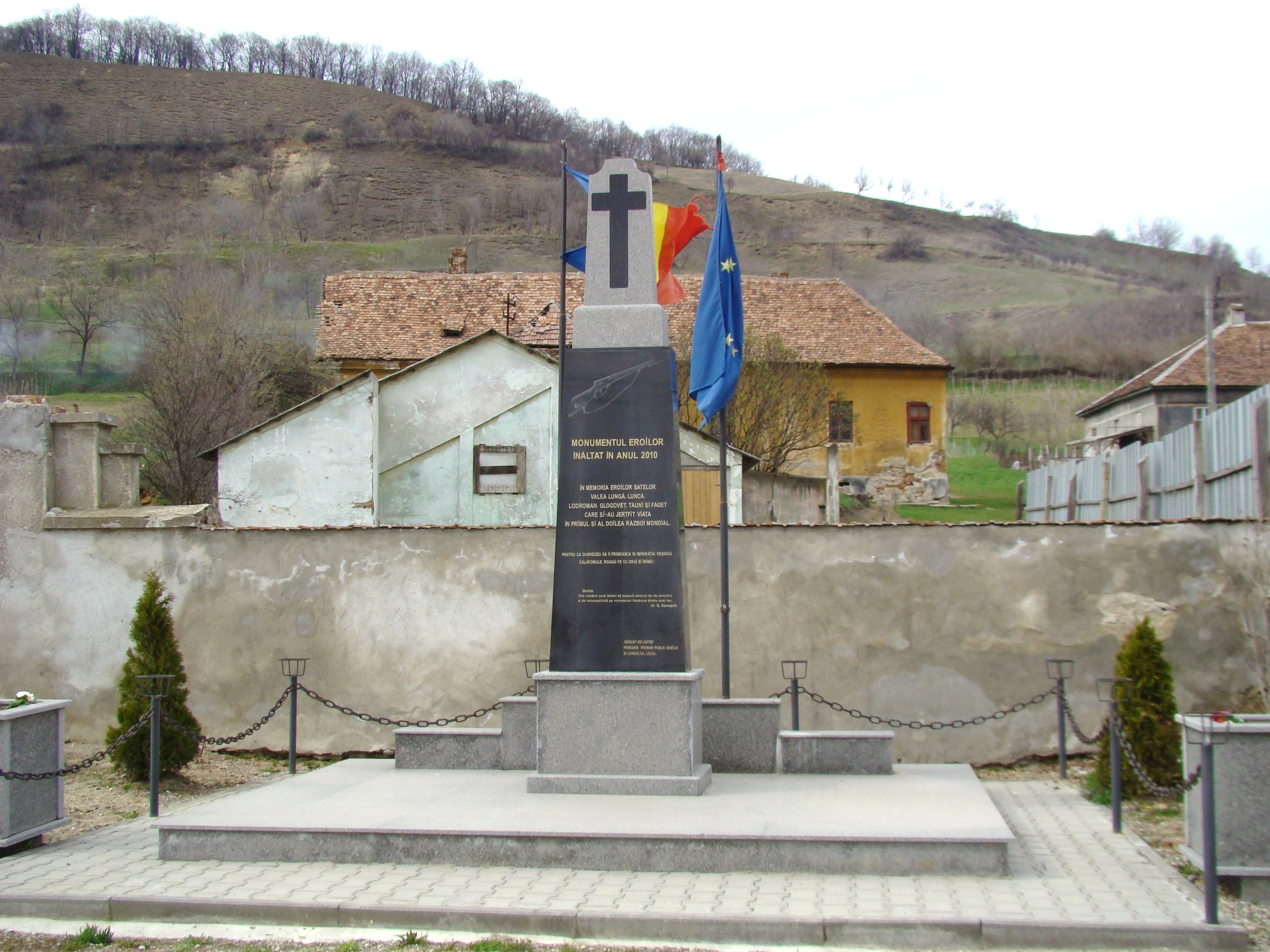
Heroes' monument
