= Dumitru Evolceanu =

Romanian literary critic

Dumitru Evolceanu (October 1, 1865–July 28, 1938) was a Romanian literary critic.

Born in Botoșani, he attended high school in his native city, followed by the literature faculty of Iași University, from which he graduated in 1889. He then took specialty courses at the École pratique des hautes études and the Collège de France (18891-1891), the University of Bonn (1891-1892) and the University of Berlin (1892-1894). Upon returning home, Evolceanu was hired as an assistant professor of Latin language and literature at the University of Bucharest's literature faculty. He rose to associate professor in 1902 and was a full professor from 1906 to 1935. In Convorbiri Literare between 1894 and 1901, he published criticism of Romanian literature. Specialized studies by Evolceanu appeared in Orpheus magazine from 1924 to 1927. He died in Timișoara.
