= Émile Legrand (scholar) =

French classical scholar

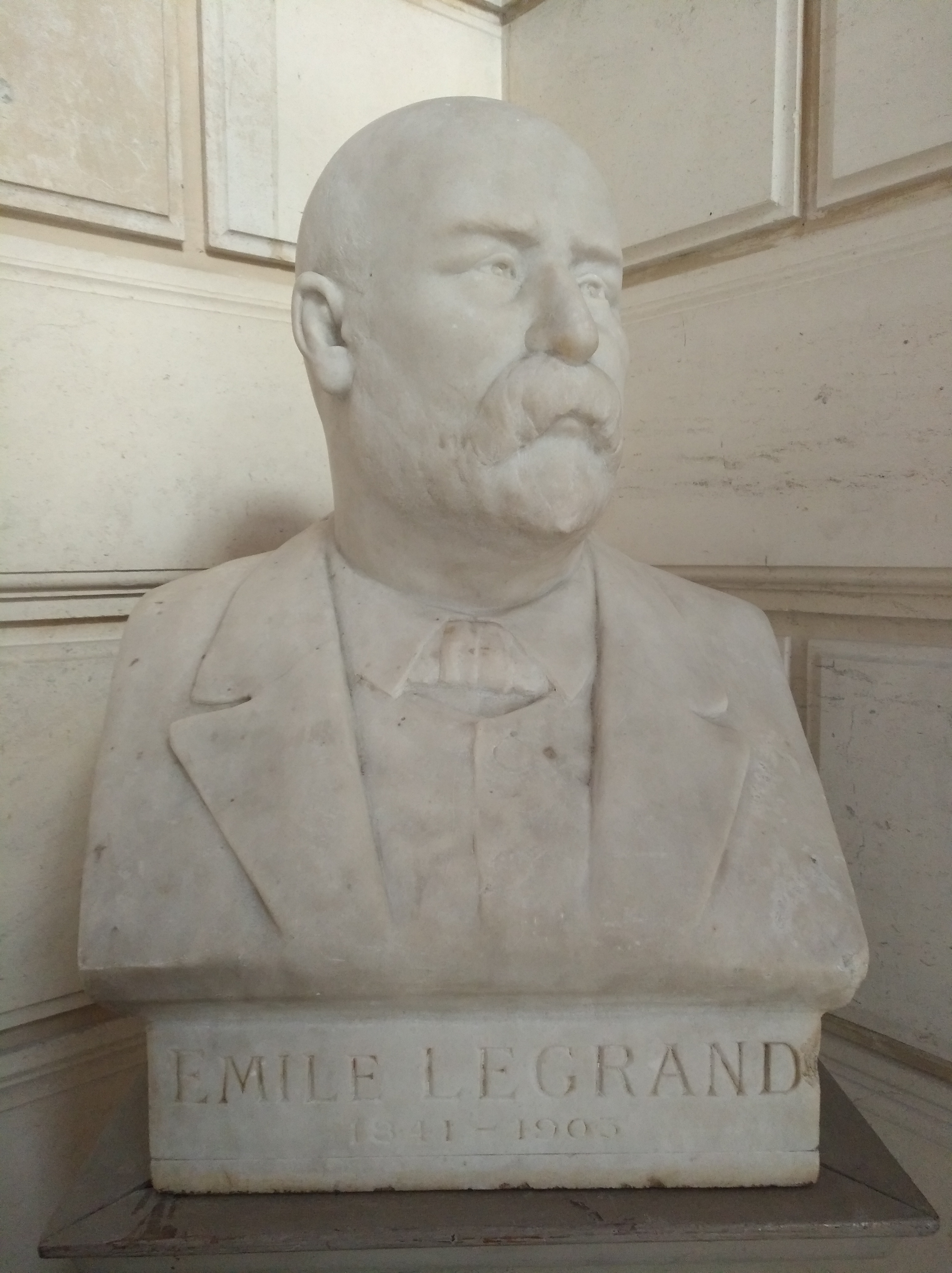
- Émile Legrand (scholar)
- Born: Émile Legrand; 30 December 1841; Fontenay-le-Marmion, France
- Died: 28 November 1903 (aged 61); Paris, France
- Occupation: scholar of Ancient Greek

Academic work
- Discipline: Classics

Émile Legrand (30 December 1841 – 28 November 1903) was a French classical scholar.

== Life ==
He was born in 1841.

He died in 1903.

== Career ==
He has been described as the leading scholar of modern Greek in late nineteenth-century France.

== Bibliography ==
He is the author of a number of books:

- Bibliographie Hellénique, ou Description Raisonnée des Ouvrages Publiés en Grec par des Grecs aux XVe et XVIe Siècles.
- Bibliographie Hellénique
- Bibliographie Ionienne
