= Ioan Bogdan (historian) =

Member of the Romanian Academy

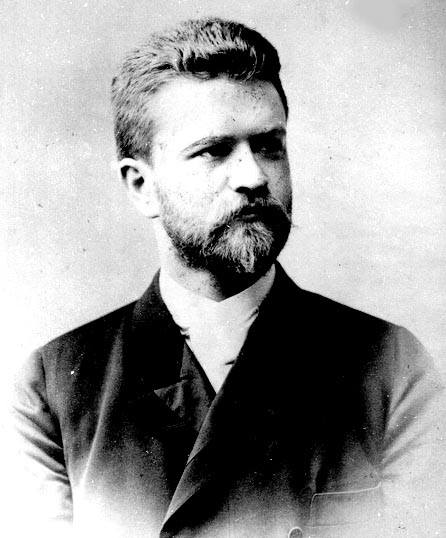
Ioan Bogdan

Ioan Bogdan (born July 25, 1864, Șcheii Brașovului, Austrian Empire - d. June 1, 1919, Bucharest, Romania) was a Romanian linguist, historian and philologist, the author of studies on the language of Slavic and Romanian documents and creator of Slavo-Romanian philology. In 1903, Bogdan was elected a titular member of the Romanian Academy.

== Biography ==
Ioan Bogdan graduated high school in Brașov and university studies at the High School in Iași. A graduate in literature, he studied Slavic languages in Vienna, Petersburg and Kraków. On June 20, 1892, he was appointed professor at the Faculty of Letters of the University of Bucharest, where he was dean in: 1898, 1900, 1902, 1904, 1906, 1909, 1910 and 1912. He was a member of the Moscow Society of History and Antiquities.

On March 31, 1892, he was elected a corresponding member of the Romanian Academy, and on March 29, 1903, he was appointed a full member. Ioan Bogdan was vice-president of the Romanian Academy twice (the first time between May 25, 1910 - May 25, 1913 and the second time between May 28, 1916 - June 1, 1919).

== Scientific work ==
Ioan Bogdan carried out fruitful and assiduous research activity, discovering numerous Slavo-Romanian manuscripts: Annals from Putna, Chronicles of Macarie, Eftimie and Azarie, Codices from Tulcea. His work, focused mainly on the study of the history of the Romanian people and their culture in the Middle Ages, is equally addressed to the historian, philologist and linguist. His studies, extensive comments on language problems and facts, focus especially on the lexicon of Slavo-Romanian documents. (Romanian glosses in a seventeenth-century Slavonic manuscript: A seventeenth-century Slavic-Romanian lexicon). He contributed to the elaboration of the first unique regulation of the faculties of letters and philosophy in the country (1897).

== Bogdan glosses ==
Ioan Bogdan found these glosses, in 1890, in a manuscript presented on the occasion of an exhibition in Moscow. The manuscript reproduces a Slavonic version of Matthew Vlastaris' Syntagma. As marginals, on the pages of the manuscript, 662 glosses are written in Romanian and about 70 in Slavonic. They were called Bogdan glosses. Most often, glosses contain one or two words, rarely a sentence or phrase, which glosses (translates or explains) words from the Syntagma text. The Slavonic text was dated by Magdalena Georgescu (who edited it in 1982) on the basis of paper watermarks, between 1516 and 1536, and by R. Constantinescu, at about 1520.

There is no dating in the manuscript at the time of writing the glosses. There are indications that the glosses were written after the writing of the Slavonic text, and not simultaneously with it, as R. Constantinescu considered. As a result, it was considered that they could be written, approximately, after 1516/1531 and before 1616/1631, because they present the phenomenon of rotacism, with the last attestation at this time. Ioan Bogdan appreciated - based on the calligraphy and the linguistic peculiarities - that the glosses were written at the Neamț Monastery, or at another monastery from the north of Moldavia. Magdalena Georgescu also agreed with this opinion. Alexandru Rosetti had suggested the idea of a location in northern Transylvania or in Maramureș. It is assumed that the glosses were written by an Orthodox monk or clergyman, in order to facilitate the understanding of the Slavonic text. They were interesting because a Slavonic manuscript, probably copied in the seventeenth century, found by R. Constantinescu also in Moscow, reproduces them directly. Ion Gheție and Alexandru Mareș place the "Bogdan glosses" between the writings of ecclesiastical law, namely as original literary texts.

== Published works ==
- Vechile cronici moldovenești până la Ureche (1891)
- Cronici inedite atingătoare de istoria românilor
- Cronica lui Manases. Traducere medio-bulgară făcută pe la 1350
- Însemnătatea studiilor slave pentru români
- Românii și bulgarii. Raporturile culturale și politice între aceste două popoare
- Vlad Țepeș și narările germane și rusești asupra lui (1896)
- Luptele românilor cu turcii. Cultura veche română (1898)
- Originea voievodatului la români (1902)
- Istoriografia română și problemele ei actuale
- Despre cnejii români (1903)
- Letopisețul lui Azarie (1909)
- Documentele lui Ștefan cel Mare (2 volume - 1913)
- Album paleografic moldovenesc. Documente din secolele al XIV-lea, al XV-lea și al XVI-lea.

== Bibliography ==
- Ioan Lupaș; Radu Tempea. Ioan Bogdan (1862-1919); Țara Bârsei, Annul II, no.3, mai-iunie 1930; pp. 195–203
- Jana Balacciu – Rodica Chiriacescu, Dicționar de lingviști și filologi români, București, Editura Albatros, 1978
- Dorina N. Rusu, Membrii Academiei Române, 1866-1999, Dicționar, București, Editura Academiei Române, 1999
