= Balthasar Walther =

Balthasar Walther (1558 – c. 1631) was a Silesian physician and Christian Kabbalist of German ethnicity. Born in Liegnitz in modern Poland, Walther was a significant influence on the thought of the German theosopher Jakob Böhme. As an itinerant Paracelsian enthusiast, Walther was active throughout the Holy Roman Empire, in Poland, Transylvania and elsewhere. He died in Paris sometime before December 1631.

== Biography ==
Born in Liegnitz, Silesia, Walther attended the University of Frankfurt/Oder where he studied medicine. A gifted student and an evident enthusiast of Paracelsian medicine, he thereafter received a series of appointments to Ducal courts throughout the Holy Roman Empire as a physician, alchemist and laboratory technician. Intensely interested in magic and kabbalistic wisdom, early in his life Walther collected several magical tracts, the manuscripts of which survive in European libraries to this day. In order to deepen his acquaintance with kabbalistic and magical teachings, between 1597 and 1599 Walther traveled to Africa and the Holy Land in order to learn at the feet of Jewish and Arab practitioners. Several years after his return to Europe, he made the acquaintance of Jakob Böhme, probably in late 1617. In 1612 he became a close friend of Boehme. In 1619-20 he studied with Boehme. Along with the likes of the Torgau chiliast Paul Nagel, Walther became a fiery propagandist and promoter of Böhme's work, although for several years he was torn between Böhme's doctrines and those of Böhme's arch-rival, the antinomian Esajas Stiefel. After several years of proselytizing on Böhme's behalf, Walther died in Paris, probably before 1631.

== Works by Walther ==
A complete bibliography of Walther's printed works can be found in a recent article. Despite his influence, as well as his enthusiasm for kabbalistic and magical tracts, Walther himself only composed two major works, neither of which reflected these interests to any great extent:

- Ode | Dicolos Tetrastrophos, totum re-|demtionis opus, à Christo Seruatore nostro hu-|mano generi praestitum, breuiter com-|plectens ... (Zerbst: Faber, 1585). A devotional poetic work.
- BREVIS ET VERA | DESCRIPTIO | RERVM AB | ILLVST. AMPLISS. | ET FORTISS. MILITIAE | CON-|trapatriæ suæ Reiq[ue] Pub. Christianæ hostes | Duce ac Dn. Dn. Jön Michaele, Mol-|dawiæ Transalpinæ sive VValachiæ | Palatino gestarum, | In eiusdem aula Tervvisana fideliter collecta | opera & studio. (Görlitz: Rhambau, 1599). A biography of the Wallachian Prince Michael the Brave.

A third work, although actually written by Jakob Böhme, was inspired by 40 questions proposed to the philosopher by Walther himself concerning the nature of the human soul. It seems clear that Walther's interests influenced the content of Böhme's responses. The first edition of these Forty Questions on the Soul (to use its English title) was provided by Johann Angelius Werdenhagen, a friend of Walther, shortly after the physician's death in Paris:

- Ψυχολογια Vera I. B. T. XL Quæstionibus explicata, et rerum publicarum vero regimini: ac earum Maiestatico iuri applicata, a Iohanne Angelio Werdenhagen I.C.C. (Amsterdam: Jansson, 1632).

== Biographical Studies and Secondary Literature ==
Despite his significance to and influence upon the theosophy of Jakob Böhme, Walther has attracted little scholarly attention and remained something of a historical cipher. A contemporary biographical account, printed within 20 years following Walther's death is provided in:

- Abraham von Franckenberg, ‘Gründlicher und warhafter Bericht von dem Leben und Abschied des in Gott selig-ruhenden Jacob Böhmens...[c.1651]’ in Jakob Böhme, Sämtliche Schriften. Faksimile-Neudruck der Ausgabe von 1730,(Stuttgart: Friedrich Frommanns Verlag, 1961) vol. 10, § 18, p. 15.
- Ulmann Weiß: Die Lebenswelten des Esajas Stiefel oder Vom Umgang mit Dissidenten, Stuttgart 2007, 452-462, 551-553 ISBN 978-3-515-08856-5
- Jacob Böhmes Weg in die Welt. Ed. by Theodor Harmsen (Pimander Texts and Studies published by the Bibliotheca Philosophica Hermetica 16), Amsterdam 2007, 73-83, 461-474 & passim [ISBN 978-3-7728-2446-3; ISBN 978-90-71608-20-9]

Scholarly articles dedicated to Walther's life and works are:

- Leigh T.I. Penman, ‘A Second Christian Rosencreuz? Jakob Böhme’s Disciple Balthasar Walther (1558-c.1630) and the Kabbalah. With a Bibliography of Walther’s Printed Works.’ Western Esotericism. Selected Papers Read at the Symposium on Western Esotericism held at Åbo, Finland, on 15-17 August 2007. (Scripta instituti donneriani Aboensis, XX). T. Ahlbäck, ed. Åbo, Finland: Donner Institute, 2008: 154-172. (ISBN 9789521220821)
- Erich Worbs, ‘Balthasar Walther. Ein Porträt aus dem schlesischen Frühbarock.’ Schlesien 11 (1966), 8-13.
- Georg Gustav Fülleborn. ‘Balthasar Walther aus Glogau, ein Schüler Jakob Böhmes.’ Die schlesischen Provinzialblätter. Literarische Beilage 20 (1794), 353-360.
