= Alexandru Rosetti =

Romanian linguist (1895–1990)

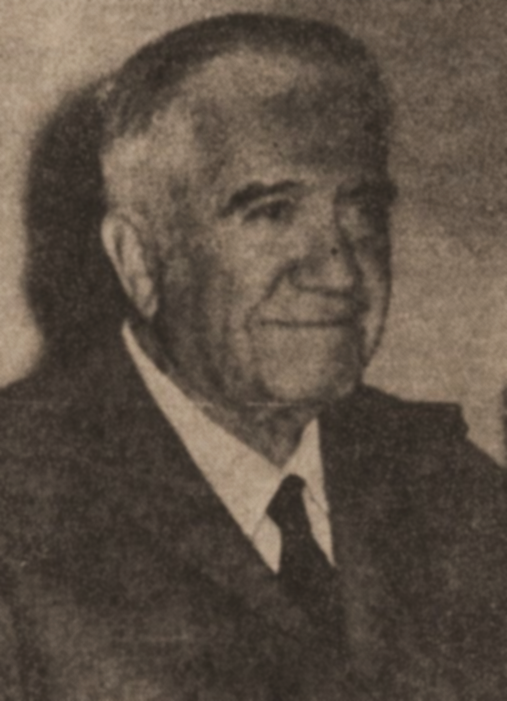
- Rosetti in 1975, at age 79
- Born: October 20, 1895; Bucharest, Kingdom of Romania
- Died: February 27, 1990 (aged 94)
- Education: University of Bucharest
- Occupations: linguist, editor, memoirist
- Known for: modern approaches to research in phonetics, phonology and general, mathematical and structural linguistics
- Spouse: Maria Rallet
- Parents: Petre Rosetti Bălănescu (father); Zoe née Cornescu (mother)

Alexandru Rosetti (October 20, 1895 – February 27, 1990) was a Romanian linguist, editor, and memoirist.

Born in Bucharest, his parents were Petre Rosetti Bălănescu, a lawyer and landowner, and his wife Zoe (née Cornescu), whose father wrote the 1874 Manualul vânătorului, prefaced with Pseudo-cynegeticos by Alexandru Odobescu. He attended primary school in Câmpulung, followed by his native city's Gheorghe Lazăr High School, from which he graduated in 1914. Between 1916 and 1920, he studied at the literature faculty of the University of Bucharest. His time there was interrupted by World War I: sent to the front, he was wounded in 1917 during the Battle of Mărășești. His professors included Ovid Densusianu, Ioan Bianu, Ion Aurel Candrea, and Dimitrie Onciul. His first published work appeared in 1920 upon graduation; titled "Colindele religioase la români", the study was published in Analele Academiei Române. Memoriile secțiunii literare. On scholarship in Paris from 1920 to 1928, he first attended the École pratique des Hautes Études, completing the program with a 1924 thesis on rhotacism in Romanian. He went on to the Sorbonne, submitting two theses in 1926: one on 16th-century Romanian phonetics, and another on Romanian letters from the late 16th and early 17th centuries in the Bistrița archives.

Upon his return home, Rosetti was named associate professor of general and experimental phonetics at Bucharest in 1928. He became full professor in 1932 and secured a tenured position in the Romanian department in 1938, upon the death of Densusianu.

A friend of King Carol II, he undertook sustained activity within the Royal Foundations for Literature and Art, heading the foundation from 1933 to 1940, its press from 1933 to 1947 and Revista Fundațiilor Regale from 1945 to 1947. In 1944, during World War II, he was among the signers of a memorandum urging the Ion Antonescu regime to withdraw Romania from fighting alongside the Axis powers. Following a change in government later that year, he served as dean of the literature faculty (1945–1946) and university rector (1946–1949). He joined the Romanian Communist Party in 1946, and acquired the nickname of "red boyar". In 1948, under the new communist regime, he was elected a titular member of the Romanian Academy. Although an unhesitating adherent to the ruling party—indifferent to a succession of dictatorships, he was primarily concerned with using them to the advantage of his studies—his liberal Europeanism caused him to be excluded from the university between 1951 and 1954, a period of high Stalinism. In 1961, he established the Academy's Center for Phonetic and Dialectological Research, formerly a department within Iorgu Iordan's Institute of Linguistics. He was a member of the Yugoslav Academy of Sciences and Arts, a corresponding member of the Swedish Academy, and doctor honoris causa of the universities of Montpellier and Aix-Marseille.

Rosetti promoted modern approaches to research in phonetics, phonology and general, mathematical and structural linguistics. He headed specialist publications such as Bulletin linguistique, Studii și cercetări lingvistice, Fonetică și dialectologie, Revue roumaine de linguistique and Cahiers de linguistique théorique et appliquée. He authored the monumental Istoria limbii române, which appeared in six volumes between 1938 and 1946, and was frequently re-edited, as well as other valuable linguistic works. In the field of literature, he was among the foremost editors of the interwar period and lent support to numerous authors, and also an anthologist (Cronicarii români, 1944; Schiță de istorie socială a limbii române, 1975). However, his main contribution was as a subtle memoirist: Note din Grecia (1938), Diverse (1962), Cartea albă (1968), Călătorii și portrete (1977). Other works touch on problems of a modern approach to literature: Le Mot. Esquisse d'un théorie générale (1943; published in Romanian as Filosofia cuvântului, 1946); Istoria limbii române literare, vol. I (in collaboration), 1966. In 1977, Rosetti published his correspondence with George Călinescu, revealing his role in the composition of the latter's 1941 magnum opus, Istoria literaturii române de la origini până în prezent. He was awarded the Herder Prize in 1980. A man of robust health, the 94-year-old Rosetti suffered a burn accident soon after the Romanian Revolution of 1989. Taken to Elias Hospital, he continued making plans for the future during his final days.

He married Maria Rallet, of an old boyar family; her father, Ion D. Rallet, was a professor of mathematics at the University of Iași. In 1944, she became vice president of the Democratic Federation of Women of Romania; from 1948, she was president of the Union of Democratic Women of Romania. Rosetti's research centre was named after him in 1992. In 2002, it merged with the Iordan Institute to form the Iorgu Iordan – Al. Rosetti Institute of Linguistics.
