= Făget (disambiguation) =

Făget may refer to several places in Romania:

- Făget, a town in Timiș County
- Făget, a village in Valea Lungă Commune, Alba County
- Făget, a village in Ghimeș-Făget Commune, Bacău County
- Făget, a village in Breasta Commune, Dolj County
- Făget, a village in Drajna Commune, Prahova County
- Făget mine, a large mine in Rodna, Bistrița-Năsăud County
- Făget, a tributary of the river Izvorul Alb in Bacău County

== See also ==
- Faget (disambiguation)
- Făgetu (disambiguation)
- Făgețel (disambiguation)
