= Octavian Smigelschi =

Austro-Hungarian Romanian painter

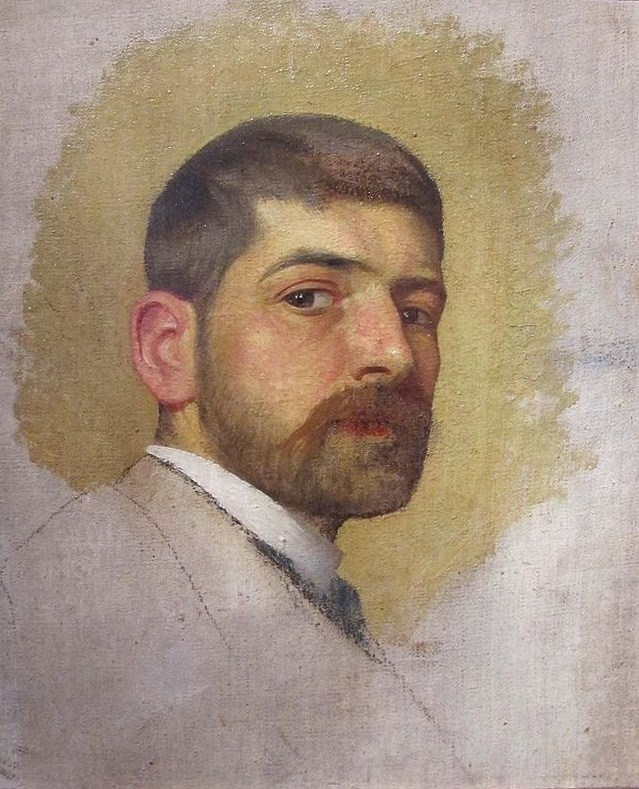
- Self-portrait
- Born: March 21, 1866; Nagyludas, Principality of Transylvania, Austrian Empire (now Ludoș, Romania)
- Died: November 10, 1912 (aged 46); Budapest, Transleithania, Austria-Hungary (now Budapest, Hungary)
- Resting place: Blaj, Romania
- Known for: Mural art, printmaking, modelli, icon painting, illuminated manuscript
- Notable work: Interior painting at Sibiu Orthodox Cathedral
- Movement: Romanticism, Naturalism, Academic art, Symbolism, Art Nouveau, Luceafărul, Baia Mare School
- Awards: Romanian Expo prize for icon painting (1906); Vilmos Fraknói (1907)

Octavian or Octav Smigelschi (last name also Smigelski, Smighelschi, Szmigelszki, or Szmigelschi; Hungarian: Szmigelszki Oktáv; 21 March 1866 – 10 November 1912) was an Austro-Hungarian painter and printmaker, one of the leading culturally Romanian artists in his native Transylvania. Of mixed Polish, Aromanian, and possibly Ruthenian, background, he identified mainly with the Romanian-speaking Greek-Catholics, although some of his most important work was also done for the rival Romanian Orthodox Church. Smigelschi studied under Bertalan Székely at the Drawing School and Art Teachers' College in Budapest, becoming familiar with the historicist trend in contemporary Hungarian art. While working on and off at high schools in Upper Hungary and Transylvania, he experimented with borrowings from ancient Romanian handicrafts. Smigelschi's European journeys with Arthur Coulin took him to Cervara di Roma, where he studied Renaissance art, while moving away from academic art and into Symbolism and Art Nouveau.

Modernizing themes from Romanian folklore and Byzantine art, from 1903 Smigelschi focused his effort mainly on Christian art and modelli, including initial work for decorating Blaj Cathedral. He was among those commissioned to paint Sibiu Orthodox Cathedral, which required him to study religious art in the neighboring Kingdom of Romania. Smigelschi's "new vision" combined elements of Symbolism into the Orthodox tradition—a synthesis also found in his murals for smaller churches throughout Transylvania, and in his work on icons. His contribution was relatively ignored in Romania, but well-liked in Transylvania and Transleithania at large, earning Smigelschi the Vilmos Fraknói prize in 1907. After living as an expatriate in Rome, he died of a heart disease while he was preparing to focus his work on Hungarian churches.

== Biography ==
=== Background and early life ===
The artist's father, Mihail Śmigielski, came from Partitioned Poland. According to historian Nicolae Iorga, the family descended from chorąży (standard-bearers) to the Polish king. Another writer suggests a Ruthenian background; Mihail was an Eastern-rite Catholic, and the Austrian Partition of Poland was home to numerous Ruthenian Greek-Catholics. However, he does allow for the possibility that the elder Smigelschi adopted the faith after arriving in Transylvania. Octavian Smigelschi's own ethnic identity has been subject to some debate, with both Polish and Hungarian suggested, but he considered himself as Romanian, and was described by Transylvanians as the region's "only Romanian painter."

Mihail was a member of the szlachta noble class who fled Poland following the 1848 Revolution and arrived in the Principality of Transylvania in 1850. Initially settling in Bungard, he married Ana Sebastian, an Aromanian from Macedonia and also a Greek-Catholic. Later, he moved to Nagyludas in Szeben County, now Ludoș, Sibiu County, to work as a notary. He became involved with the cultural life of Romanian communities, and was noted for his participation in a choir which performed at Tălmaciu in February 1887. At Nagyludas, Mihail fathered four sons. One of them, Victor, obtained a Theology doctorate from the University of Vienna, teaching the subject and serving as a canon in Blaj. Another, Vasile, became an architect and was influenced by Romanian nationalism. Mihail's other son, Cornel Smigelschi, died in 1892, an event which inspired Octavian to paint a number of portraits from memory, and also to produce a series of drawings and canvasses of Abaddon. Cornel is depicted in the 1892 "Young Man Reading".

Octavian Smigelschi began school in his native village, and in 1880 enrolled at the state Hungarian high school in Sibiu. There, he became close friends with Fritz Schullerus, and the two took art classes from Carl Dörschlag, a German immigrant. Following graduation in 1884, he obtained a public scholarship to study at the Drawing School and Art Teachers' College in Budapest, headed by Bertalan Székely, together with Schullerus. At this early stage of his career, he absorbed direct influences from Székely, Károly Ferenczy, and Pál Szinyei Merse. During summer 1886, while on vacation, he dedicated himself to drawing the rural landscapes of Szeben County, which produced a long series of drawings and watercolors, all showing echoes from the Barbizon school, and, possibly, Smigelschi's familiarity with the artistic guidelines set by John Ruskin. Smigelschi completed his studies in 1889. The following year, he applied for a scholarship in Romania, explaining that Hungary was stifling his creativity. He was finally integrated by the Hungarian education system, and named art teacher in the Upper Hungarian (Slovak) town of Banská Štiavnica.

In 1890, Smigelschi held his first exhibition in Sibiu, alongside Schullerus and another Transylvanian Saxon colleague. In 1891 or 1892, he was hired to teach art at the state high school in Elisabetopol. His ambition at the time was to replicate in Romanian Transylvanian art what Mihály Munkácsy had done for Hungarian art, in introducing the peasant as a central character and using the events of his life to create a national iconography. Smigelschi held his teaching position until 1911, when he retired in order to focus on painting, although from 1905, when he moved to Sibiu, he was on a leave of absence for the same reason. During that interval, he began painting icons, which he advertised as "the only ones befitting our canon". Together with his brother Victor, Smigelschi also joined the Blaj chapter of ASTRA Society, a Romanian nationalist association.

As described by art historian Gheorghe Vida, Smighelschi's other work of the period is a transition from Romanticism to Symbolism, with frequent lapses into Naturalism and academic art. Specifically, he belongs to the branch of Symbolism cultivated by Dörschlag, Hans von Marées, Pierre Puvis de Chavannes, Max Klinger, and Béla Iványi-Grünwald. Art historian Mihai Ispir views Dörschlag and Smigelschi as the two benchmarks of a transition from "the neoclassical 'ideal' to Symbolist 'idealism'". Curators Sabin-Adrian Luca and Dana-Roxana Hrib describe Smigelschi's painting as bridging "temperate naturalism" and "influences from that branch of Symbolism which descends from German romanticism". As the 1890s went on, Smigelschi also became increasingly drawn to Art Nouveau, and was marginally affiliated with the Baia Mare School of painting, which saw him crossing paths with Ipolit Strâmbu. Beginning in 1898, he undertook trips to Munich, Dresden, Vienna, Budapest, Florence, Rome and Ravenna, studying the local Renaissance art. He bunked with Robert Wellman and Arthur Coulin at Cervara di Roma art colony. Following this sojourn, Smigelschi expanded his Symbolist range. Initially, his paintings of Abaddon became more macabre; circa 1900, however, Smigelschi introduced a merrier derivation of Symbolism, exploring the motif of "wicked fairies", which has roots in Romanian folklore.

Reportedly, Smigelschi's interest in Byzantine art first manifested itself in Italy, when he sketched after the monuments of Ravenna. He was, however, opposed to the revival of Byzantine mosaics by Miksa Róth and others, describing the technique as "minute and menial", with the inevitable loss of artistic quality between the artistic design and the finished product. He focused his neo-Byzantine attempts on more pictorial techniques. In 1903, he had contributed icons and inconostases for twelve Transylvanian churches, including German Lutheran ones in Pretai and Rumesdorf. Also that year, he held his second exhibition in Blaj, featuring exclusively religious works, including modelli for painting the Greek-Catholic cathedral. That October, his third exhibition took place in Sibiu, with 71 secular paintings and drawings.

Among the displays was a 7 x 5 m carpet woven by peasant women from Maramureș based on his indications. It depicted an eagle rising above "New Jerusalem", to a background displaying the Romanian tricolor (or, officially, the Transylvanian colors). The show drew universal acclaim due to the newness of his style and the combination of popular Romanian motifs and peasant folk art he employed. The fourth show occurred in December at the Decorative art Exhibit in Budapest, and was praised as well, including by Octavian Goga in Luceafărul and by Károly Lyka in Magyar Iparművészet. The latter credited Smigelschi designs for Christian murals as an introduction into Byzantine and Orthodox art, but overall more lively than its canons. Lyka noted that the exhibit had been planned without giving Smigelschi due credit, but that "his name shan't remain unknown for too long."

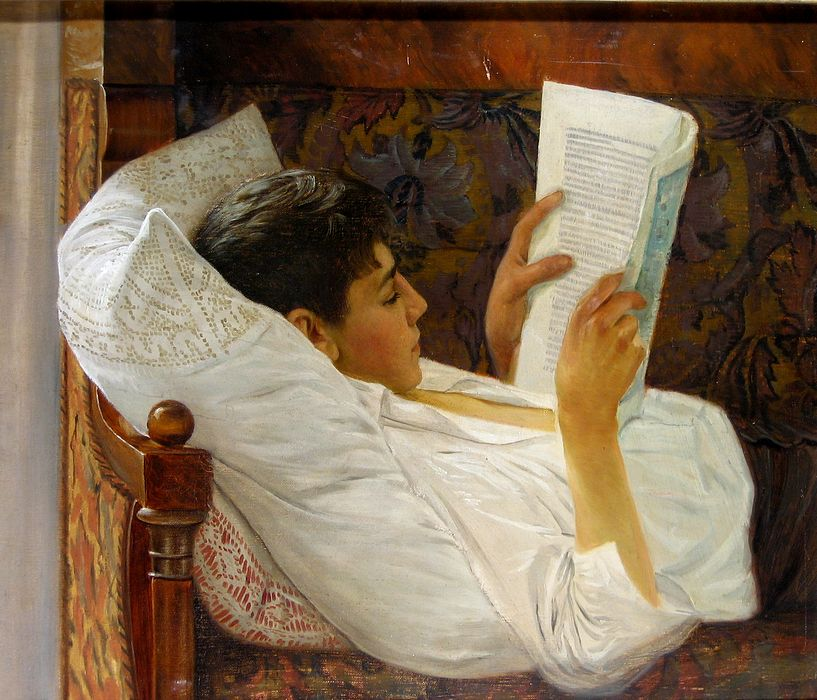
Tânăr citind ("Young Man Reading")

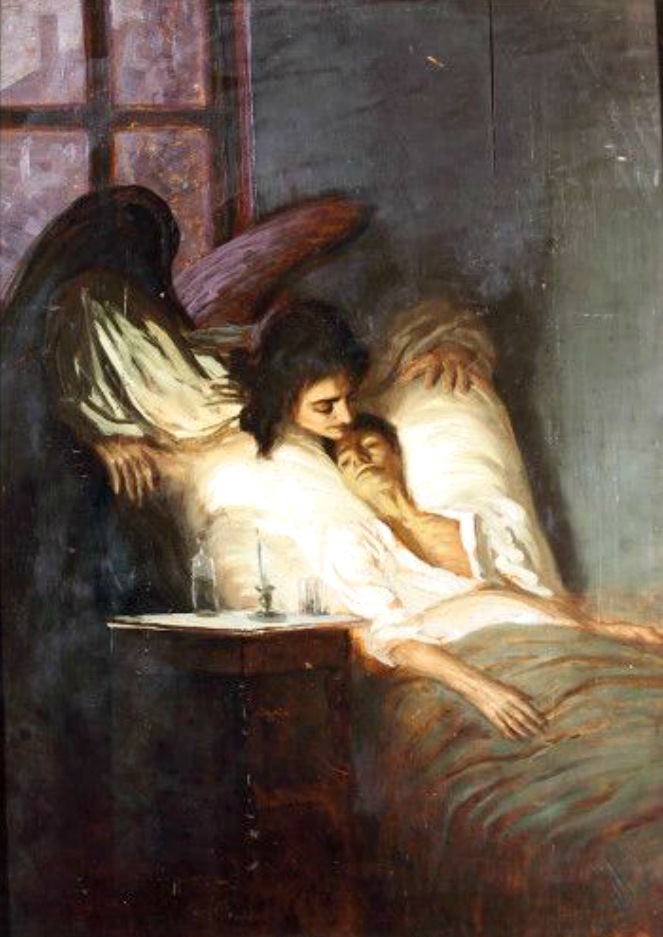
Îngerul morții ("Angel of Death")

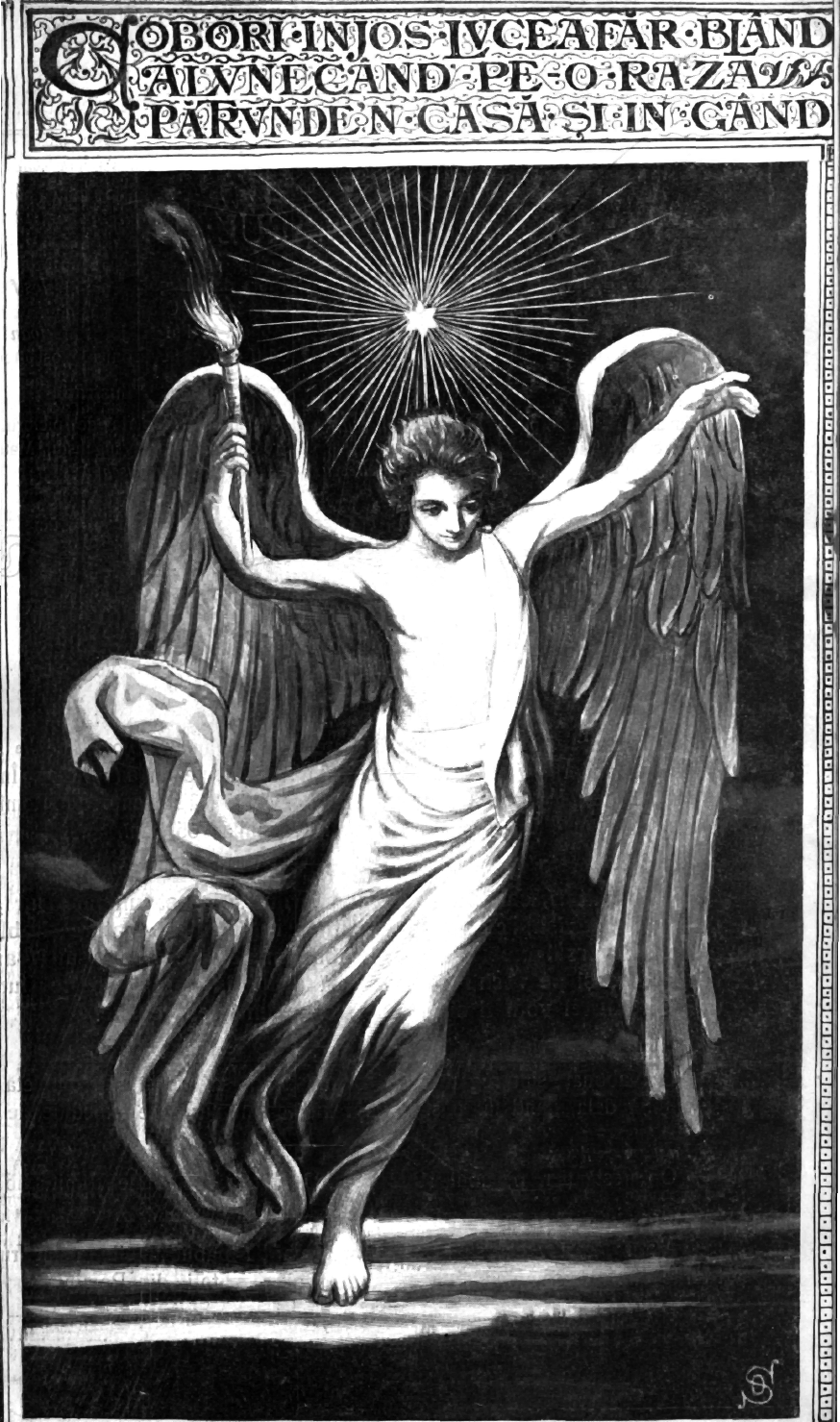
Cover art for Luceafărul, illustrating the eponymous poem

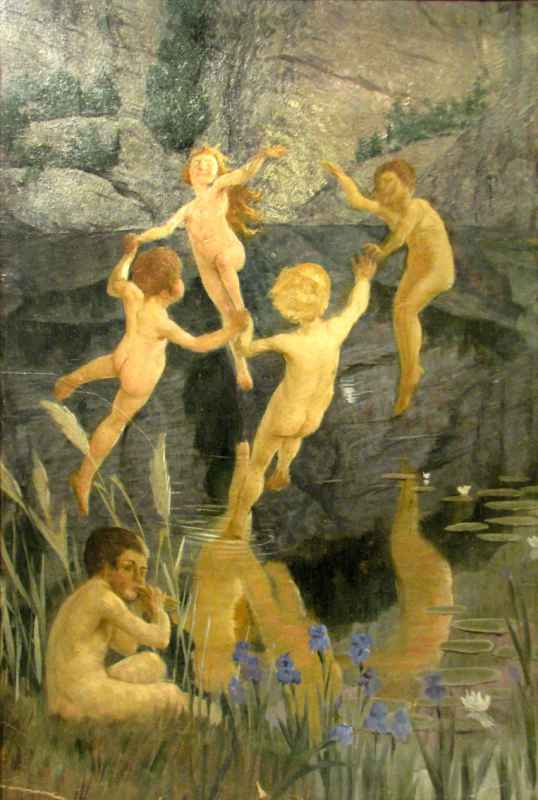
Dansul zânelor ("Dance of the Fairies")

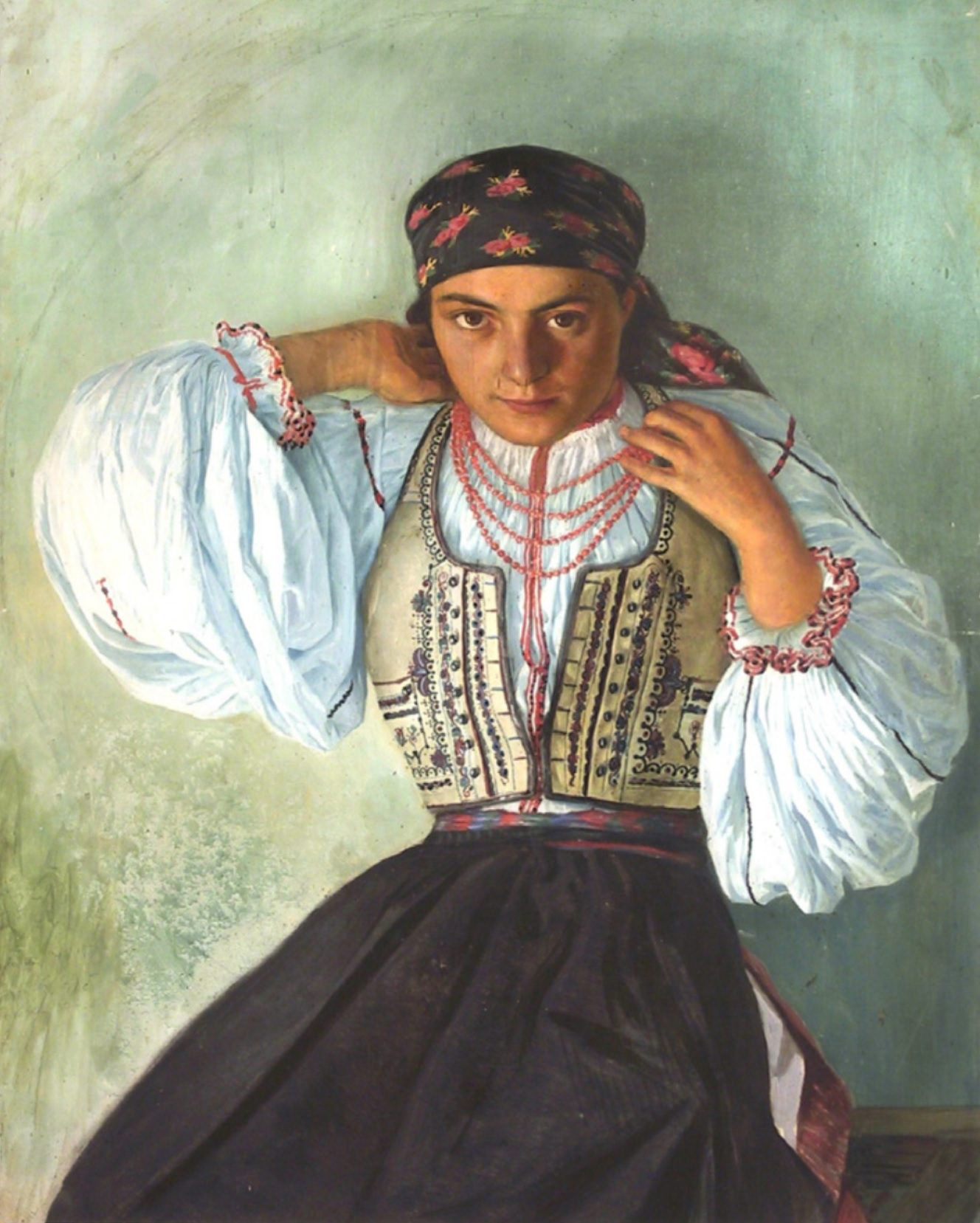
Lina cu mărgele ("Lina with Beads")

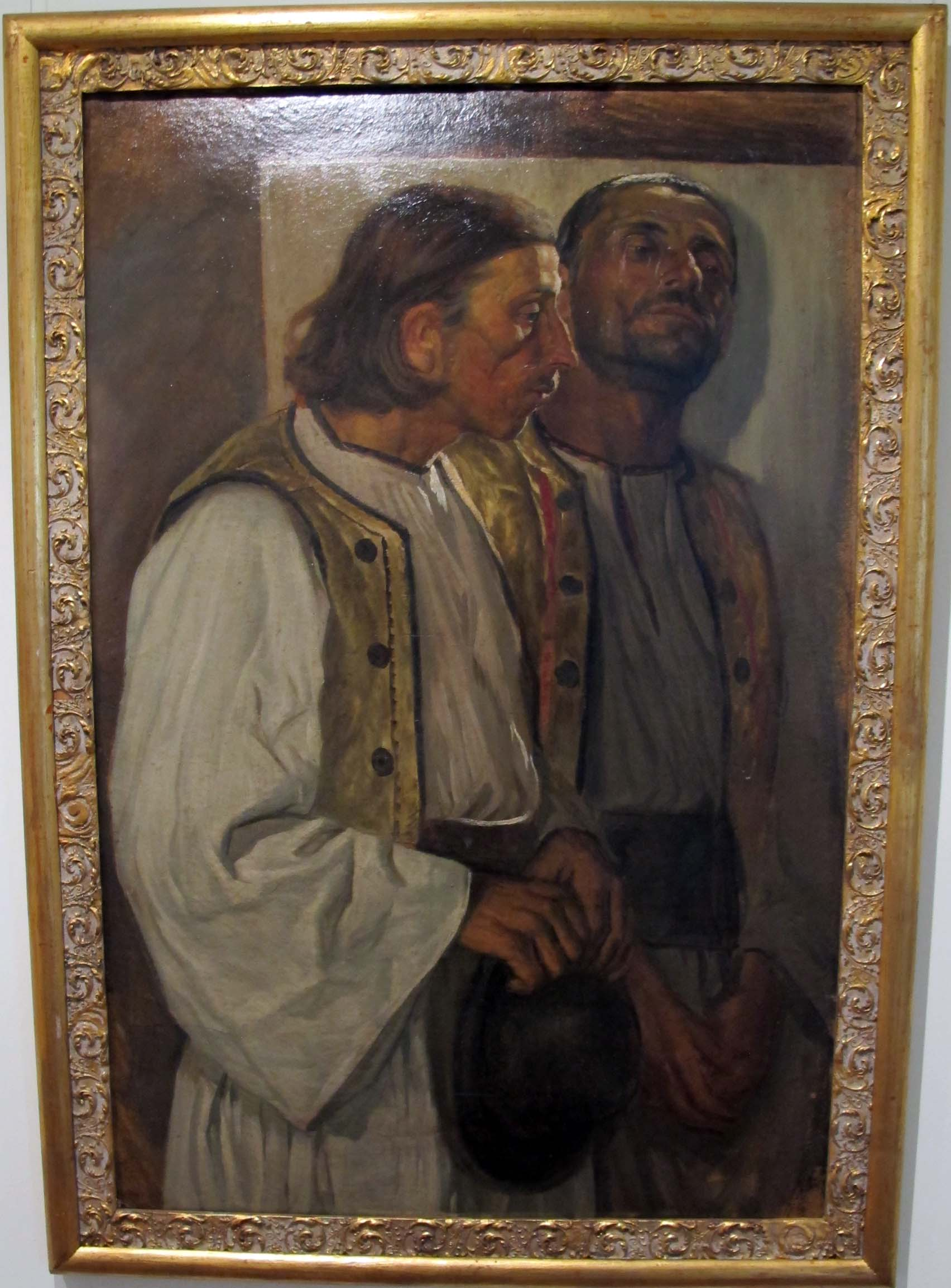
Țărani ("Peasants")

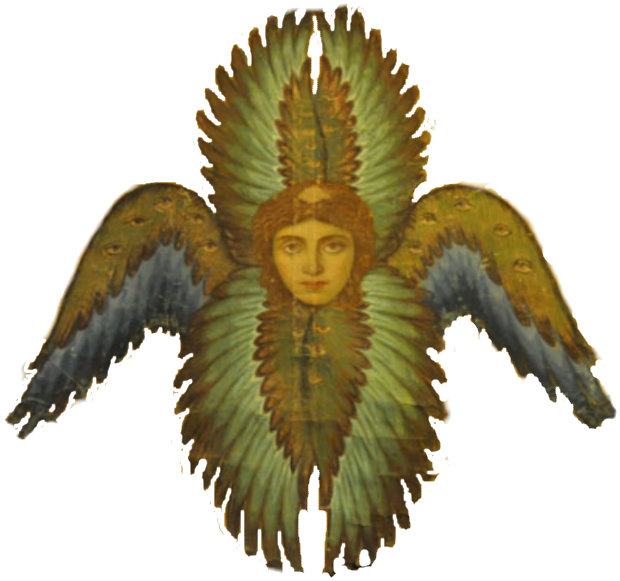
Seraph for Blaj Cathedral

=== Sibiu cathedral and later years ===
Meanwhile, the old Romanian Orthodox cathedral in Sibiu had been demolished in 1902 and a new building begun. This project drew Smigelschi's attention, who asked "his lifelong friend", journalist Valeriu Braniște, to intervene and help him obtain the commission. In his letter, he declared himself best positioned to promote an "utterly national-Romanian" art that would continue to interest foreigners. A competition opened in November 1903, with fifteen Romanian, German and Hungarian participants. A committee composed of George Demetrescu Mirea, Ion Mincu and Friedrich Miess narrowed the field down to three finalists. In April 1904, Smigelschi was selected to execute the interior painting, having outbid the original favorite, Hans Bulhardt. He was paid 32,000 crowns for the cupola, the pendentives and the iconostasis. At this time, he began to focus on traditional styles of painting, seeking to strike a balance between large-scale murals and the architectural surroundings which they were not supposed to overshadow. Accordingly, in 1904, Smigelschi crossed into the Romanian Old Kingdom as well as the Duchy of Bukovina in order to study the churches and monasteries where the Romanians' spiritual heritage is expressed, familiarizing himself with the Byzantine style that came to complement his knowledge of Renaissance painting. Reluctantly, Smigelschi also had to incorporate suggestions from the monk Elie Miron Cristea. Cristea repeatedly asked him to abandon all influences from Armenian art, which reportedly appeared in his original designs; in private notes, Smigelschi complained that Cristea was uneducated and unproductive.

In this second creative period, Smigelschi nearly abandoned all other genres in favor of monumental work. He analyzed old painted churches at Tismana, Cozia, Bistrița, Horezu, Curtea de Argeș, Bucharest, Snagov, Sinaia, Iași, Suceava, Sucevița, Dragomirna, Putna, Rădăuți, Humor, Voroneț and Cernăuți. His own work, in churches at Șanț, Rădești, Sibiu, Ciacova and elsewhere, reflects attention to tradition but not a mere reproduction thereof. From Byzantine models he took the monumental size and decorative look; this was infused with the Renaissance and German schools, in particular Arnold Böcklin, to create a neo-Byzantine style most evident in the Sibiu cathedral. In a number of Transylvanian churches, particularly in the Năsăud area, he painted icons and sometimes entire iconostases. This period saw him transposing some of his Sibiu projects in smaller form, as he did at the Greek-Catholic Churches of Fabric (Timișoara) and Rădești, and at Ciacova Orthodox Church. Smigelschi also used his study of Gavriil Uric's calligraphy in his illuminated manuscript of the Gospel, completed for Bishop Victor Mihaly de Apșa, and in diplomas for Albina Society founders, which also carried his personal seal.

After moving to Sibiu in 1905, Smigelschi was able to complete his commission there by the time the new cathedral was dedicated in May 1906. As a speaker of German and Hungarian, he fit easily into the city's artistic milieu, though he intended his contribution to emphasize "Romanianism", at a time when Romanians were still a minority in Sibiu. According to theologian Ioan Abrudan, the result is "liberated from Neoclassical naturalism", and mostly resembles work put out by the Pre-Raphaelite Brotherhood and the Nazarene movement, being similarly indebted to Fra Angelico and Sandro Botticelli.

Features of his cathedral work, which he himself published as prints in Luceafărul, include Christ Pantocrator in the cupola, the Four Evangelists on the pendentives and the painted iconostasis. Mostly done in casein paint, it was retouched by Coulin. The Sibiu project extended notions of a purely Romanian art to cover all details of the creative process. As attested by Braniște, Smigelschi was only interested in depicting the saintly figures as ideal Romanians, and purposefully avoided showing Christ as a "Jewish type". Romanian folk motifs are used in the clothing worn by the Three Magi, the shepherds and the child angels with the star, while the Nativity of Jesus is transposed to a Romanian setting. Various authors suggest that the Magi are each inspired by a ruler of the Romanian provinces (Moldavia, Wallachia and Transylvania): Alexander the Good is taken from Sucevița, Neagoe Basarab from Curtea de Argeș and Matthias Corvinus from a period engraving.

Immediately after completion, the Sibiu murals were reviewed by a specialists' commission headed by Arthur Verona, who provided a lukewarm reception. According to Iorga, Smigelschi persisted in his goal to paint a church of his own in Romania-proper, and presented his designs during the 1906 national exhibit in Bucharest, "the Capital of his People". He was sidelined in favor of "others, better seen and better connected". However, the icons he presented at the exhibit did earn Smigelschi a state prize, worth 250 lei; his Blaj carpet was also put on display for the occasion. Another portrait of Neagoe Basarab was included by Smigelschi in a 1906 mobile triptych, alongside a heroic scene from the Siege of Plevna and a panel showing sowers stricken by the vision of a better world. The work was an unsuccessful competitor in a Bucharest art show, accidentally rediscovered in 1908 by collector Francisc Hossu-Longin, but since lost. It enjoyed an episodic fame as a symbol of Romanian nationalist aspirations, after it was printed into a set of postcards commissioned by Iorga and Hossu-Longin. Accumulating influences from Bertalan Székely and direct borrowings from folk art, it was also controversial for including highly realistic elements done from life—including a possible depiction of Smighelschi's wife as Despina Doamna. The triptych also featured a slogan authored by Iorga and Goga.

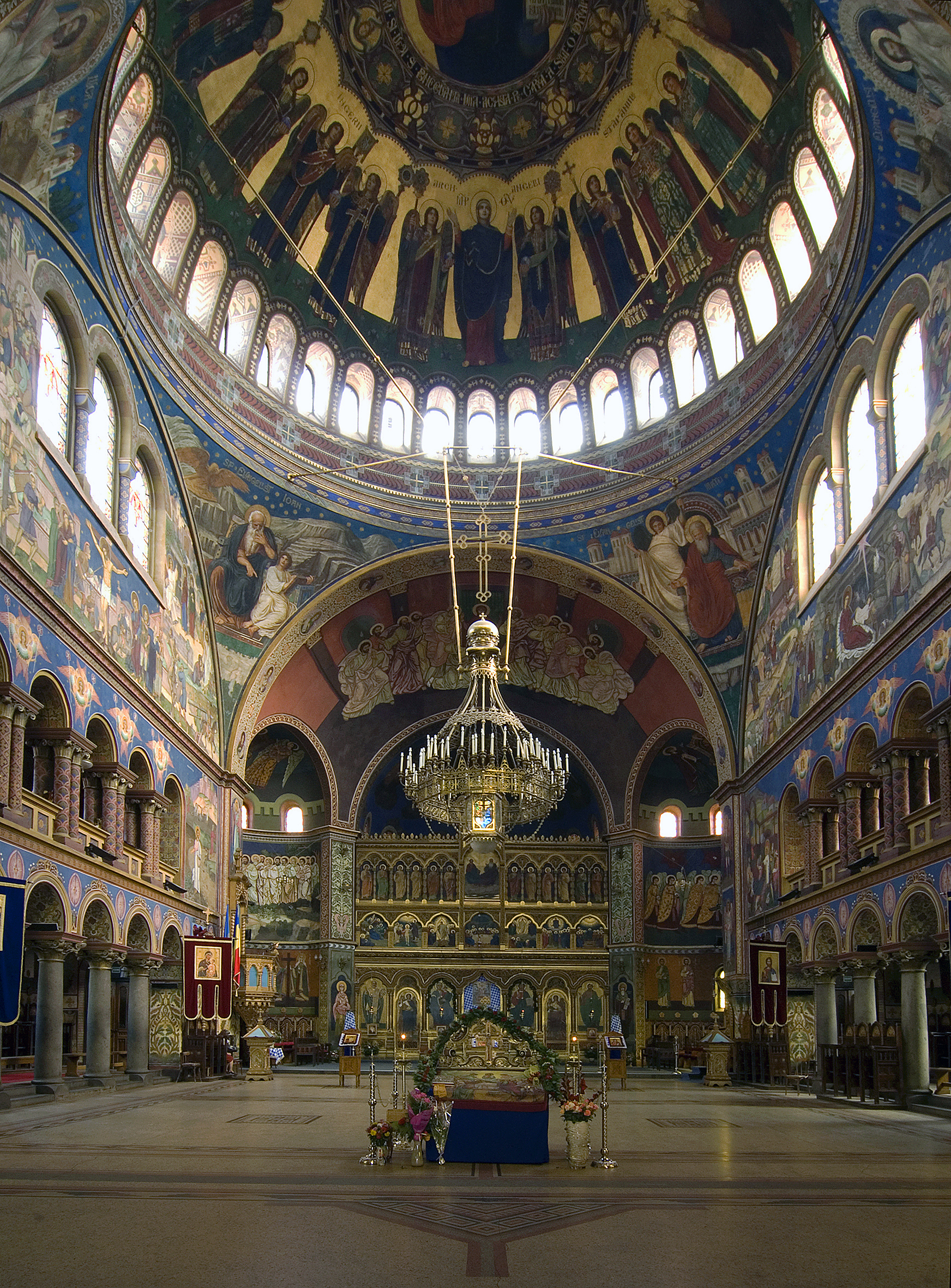
Sibiu cathedral interior

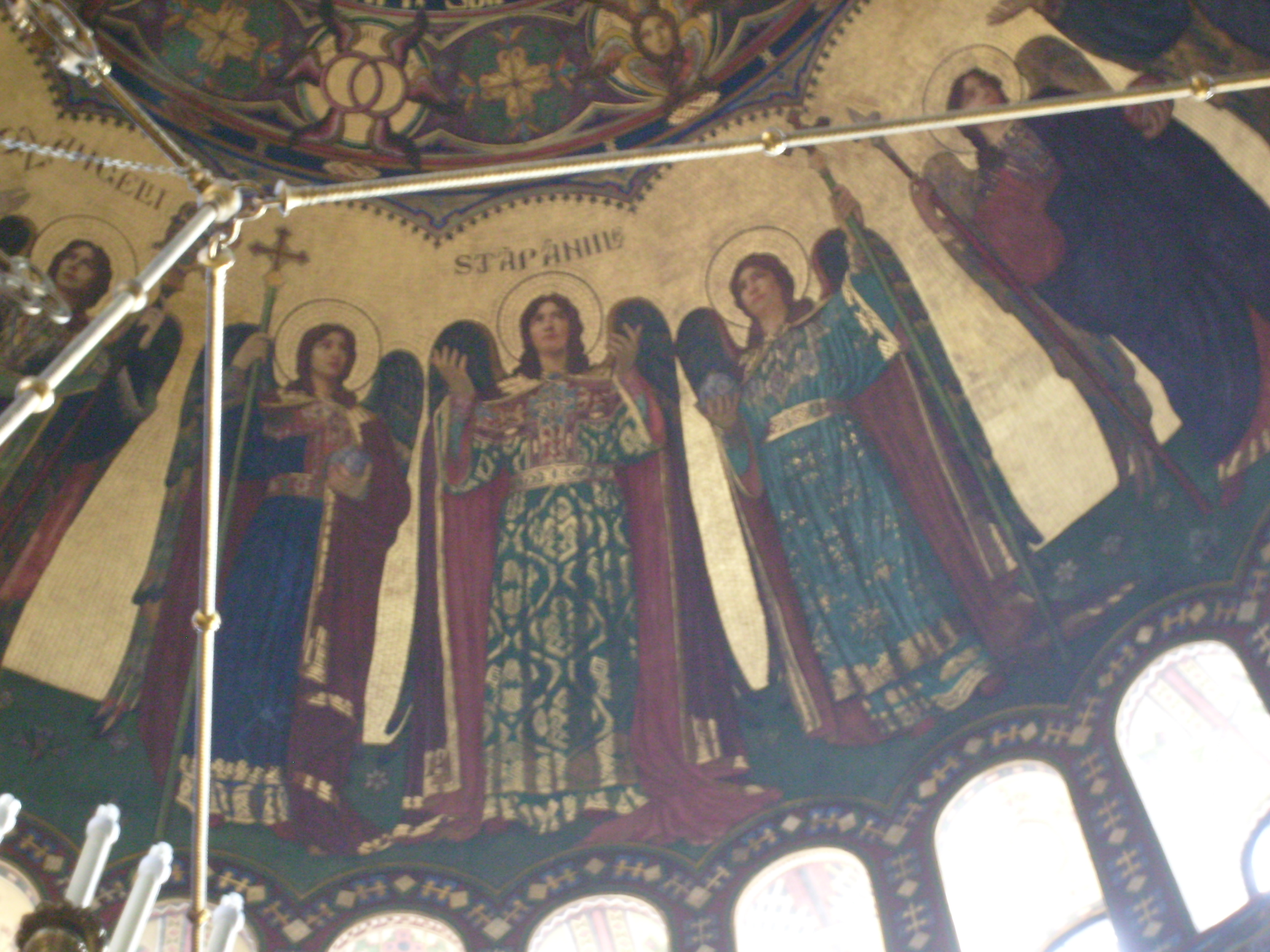
Detail of angels

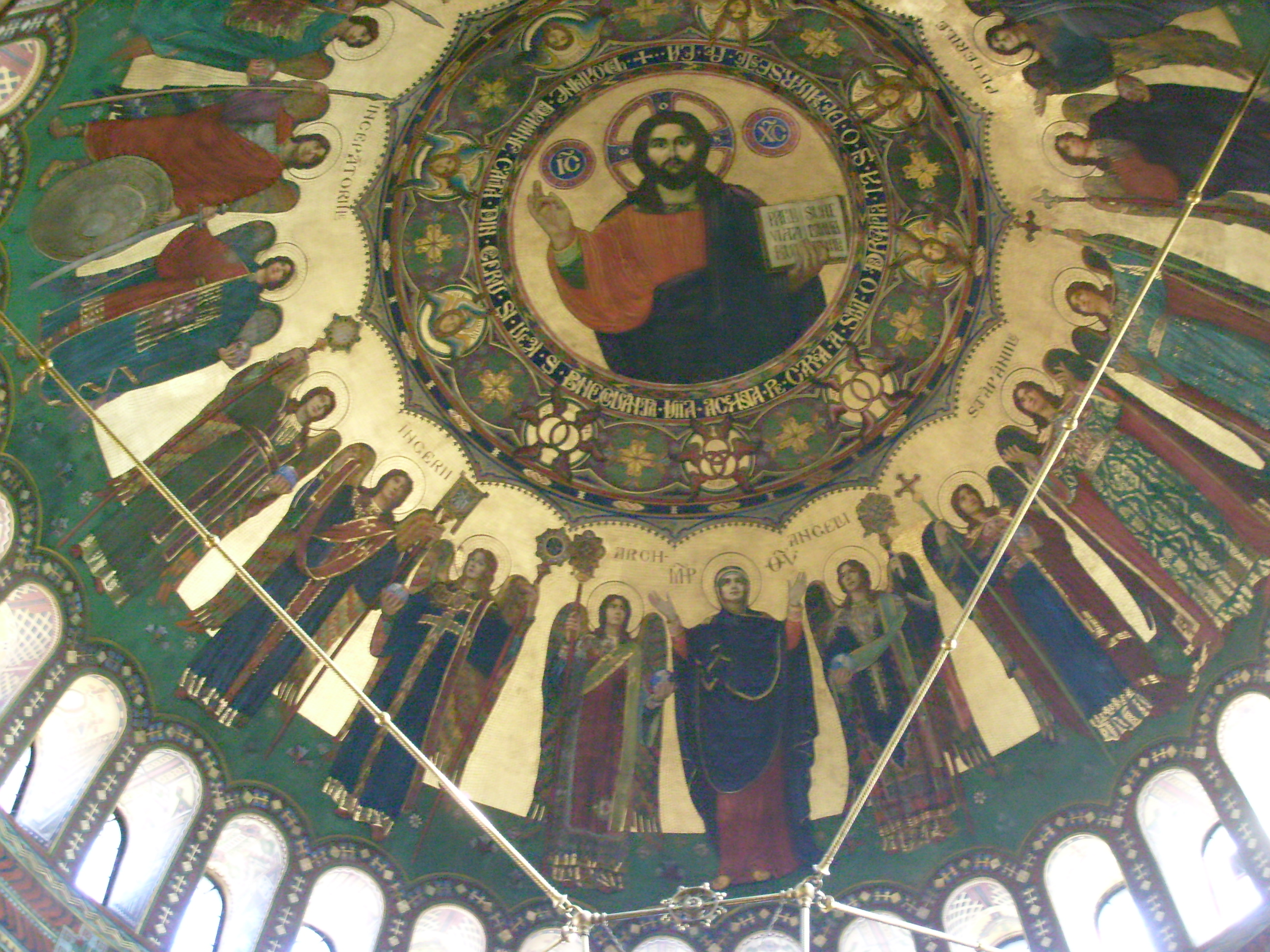
Cupola with Christ Pantocrator in the center

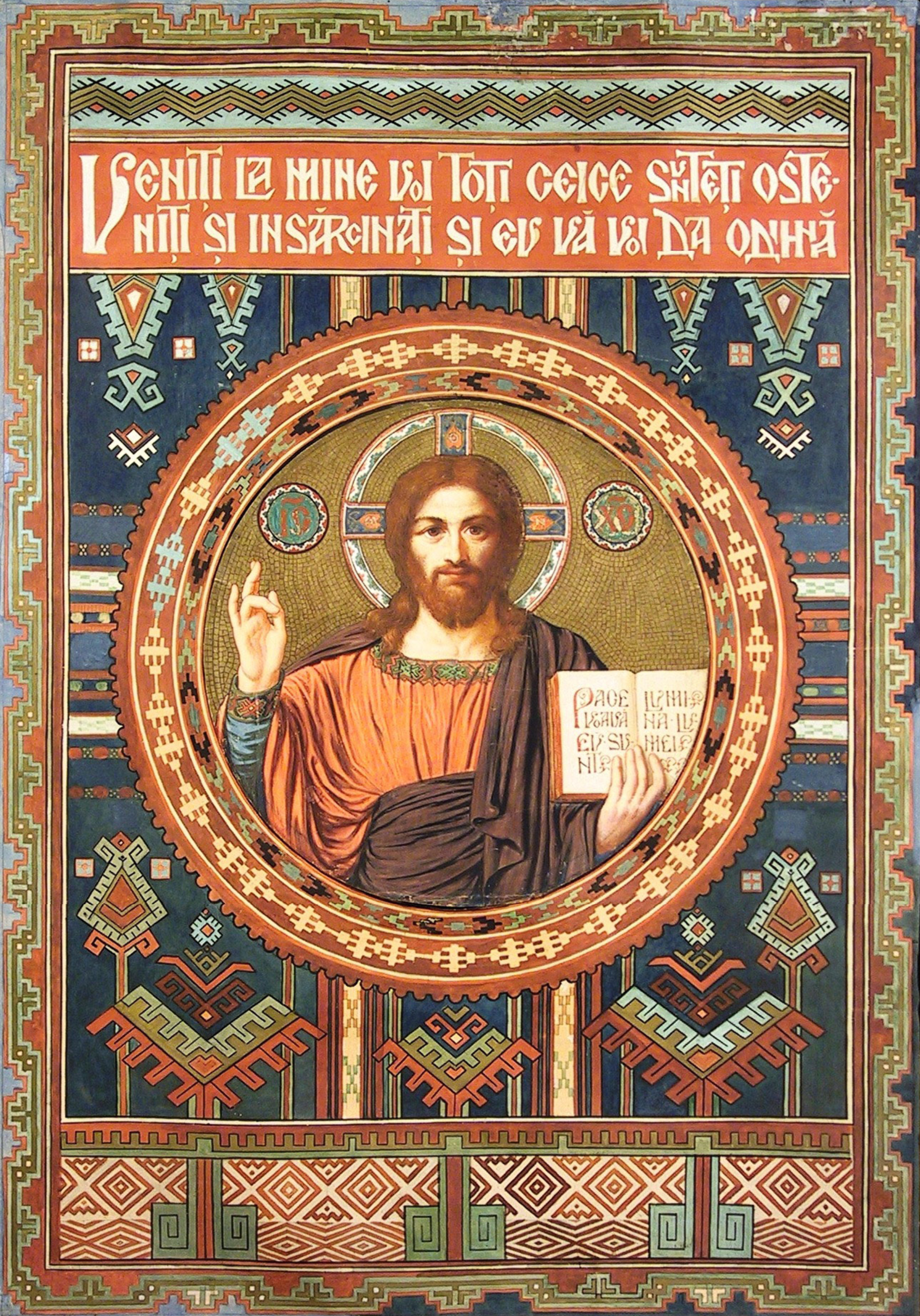
Another version of the Pantocrator

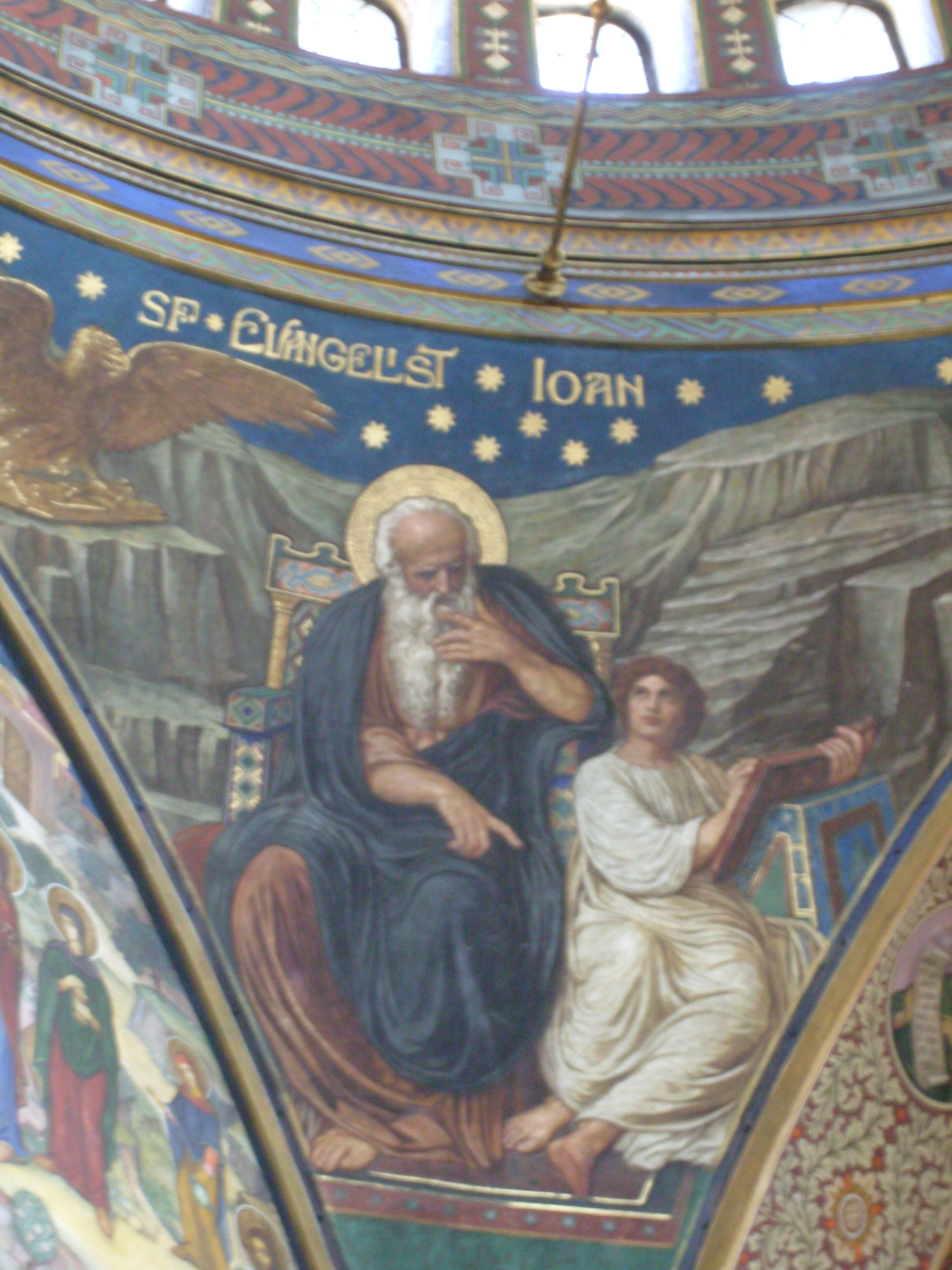
John the Evangelist

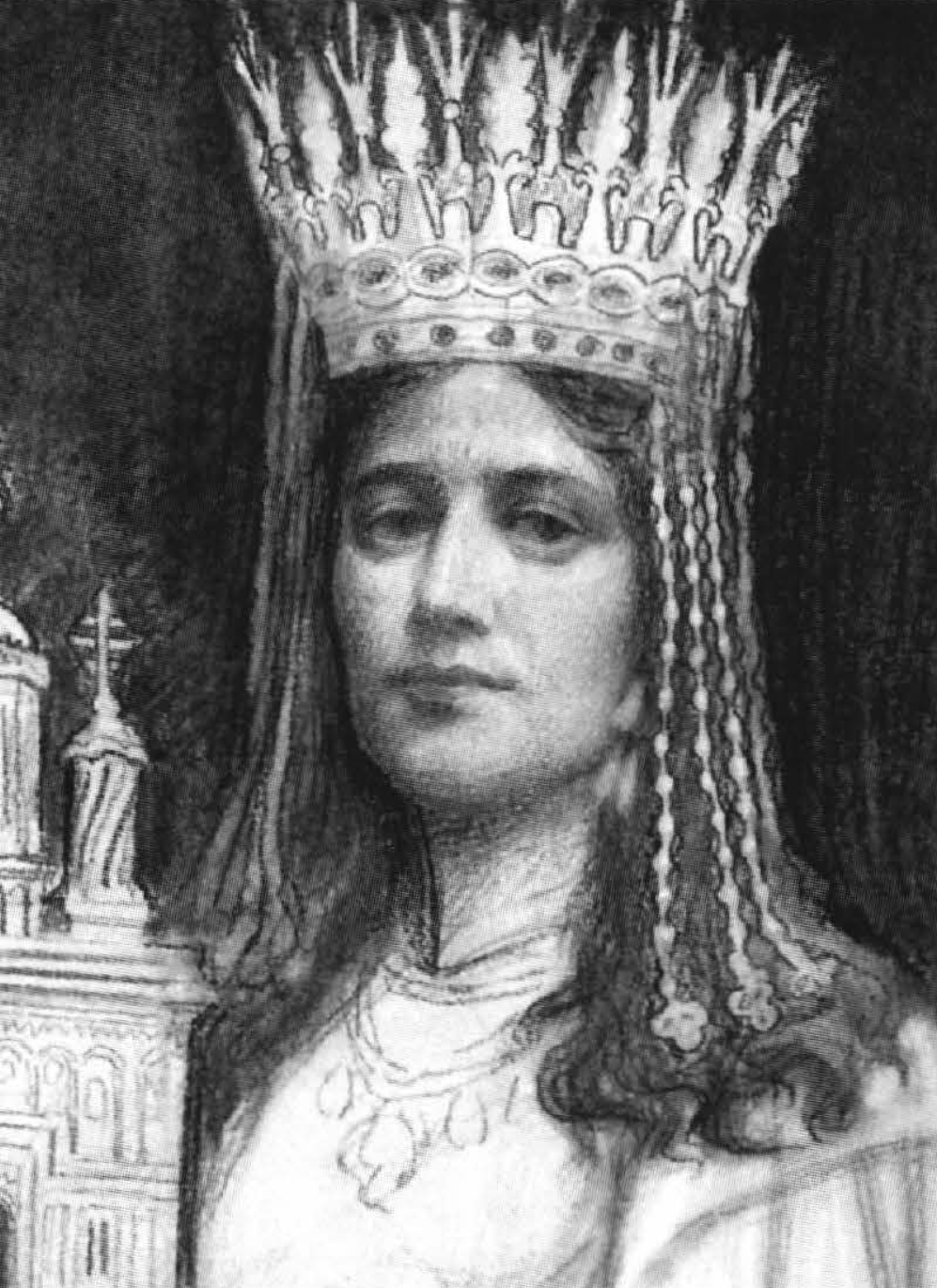
Sketch portrait of Despina Doamna (1906)

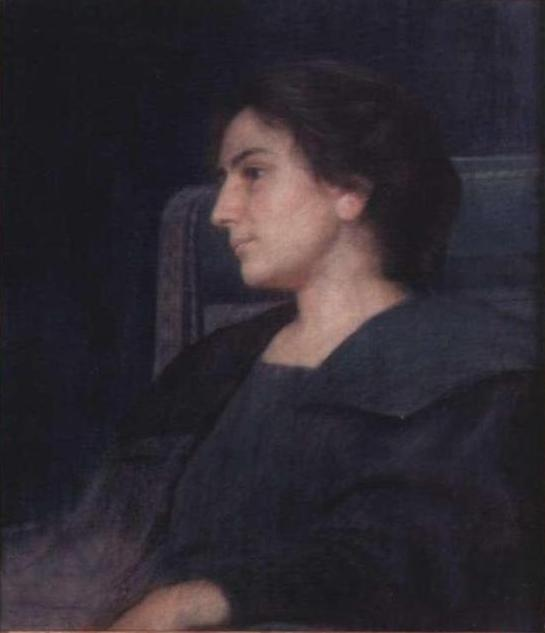
Portretul soției ("The Artist's Wife")

=== Death and posterity ===
In 1907, along with painting at Ciacova, Smigelschi donated funds to the families of those killed during the peasants' revolt. The following year, Smigelschi won a competition for the Vilmos Fraknói prize, guaranteeing him 3,000 crowns annually, a studio and a residence in Fraknói's Rome house. In September, he also organized an exhibit at the Budapest Kunsthalle—side by side with Ignác Roskovics' works, and drawing favorable mentions from Hungarian critics (including Miklós Rózsa of A Hét newspaper). In 1909, Smigelschi painted the Greek-Catholic church in Rădești. During this time, he began to show symptoms of heart disease that grew progressively worse. He received an order for painting the altar in a Rákóczi chapel in Hungary, which remained unfilled, while painting for the Blaj cathedral and the remainder of the Sibiu cathedral was left in the planning stages.

In his final years, Smigelschi returned to modelli and created a series of mannequins, possibly intending to extend into sculpture. As noted by historian Nicolae Sabău, no buyer encouraged his work in the field. He also intended to execute a triptych for the 1911 International Exhibition of Art in Rome, but this remained undone due to a heart attack. He was expected to continue working at Sibiu Cathedral, but church authorities began looking elsewhere after hearing news of his affliction. In August 1911, he was attested at living in Rome; his paintings were noticeably absent from the ASTRA Jubilee exhibit at Blaj, which took place that month. In 1912, with his disease worsening, he left for treatment at Bad Nauheim. Smigelschi then traveled to Budapest, where he took part in a contest for painting a chapel in Košice. He died in Budapest in November 1912. His brother Victor claimed the remains and had them buried in Blaj.

Iorga, in his obituary piece, claimed that both Catholics and Orthodox Transylvanians felt "undying sorrow, [sensing] that a century may pass and another painter like him [...] may still not be born." The deceased, he argued, had instilled a "new vision of the world". Likewise, Octavian Codru Tăslăuanu of Luceafărul writes that Smigelschi's "innovation created a school", although withholding judgment on "whether the innovation was for the better". However, as asserted by Ispir, Smigelschi's neo-Byzantine approach was a "perishable tear into the threads of tradition". It replaced the "post-Byzantine customs" of traditional church art with a more academic and "historicist" school. Among Smigelschi's imitators in the 1910s was Antonino Zeiler. An Italian immigrant from the Austrian Littoral who had worked with him at Caciova and Uifalău, Zeiler was in turn the art teacher of Mărioara Maior—both of them showcased at the ASTRA Jubilee. Another disciple was Virgil Simionescu, who completed murals for the Orthodox Church of Orșova in 1926.

Retrospective exhibitions before World War I include an October 1913 show at the Budapest Kunsthalle, also honoring Coulin and Bertalan Bartolomaus Papp; his paintings and drawings were arranged by his widow, who answered repeated pleas from the Hungarian Art Society. A review in Vasárnapi Ujság expressed regret that Smigelschi's large-scale decorative art had been doomed from the start by the popularity of Impressionism and the declining interest of public art bodies: "his individuality remained fluctuating, hesitant, because he was not given the space where he could have blossomed." The following month, Victor Smigelschi published a Românul article critical of Romanian authorities, noting that his brother had been bypassed in the contest for decorating Galați Orthodox Cathedral. In early 1914, however, Romanian official critic Alexandru Tzigara-Samurcaș spoke at ASTRA to criticize Smigelschi's use of textile motifs in his Sibiu murals. A note in Luceafărul acknowledged his claim and how it managed to persuade "even those who were previously supportive of Smigelschi's system".

Most of Smigelschi's works were bought and preserved by the ASTRA Museum, then transferred to Brukenthal. According to scholar Virgil Vătășianu, the sketches are the artist's most important contributions, and as such the most important artworks produced by a Transylvanian Romanian in the pre-1914 era. In the aftermath of his death, Romania went to war with Austria-Hungary; this resulted in Victor Smighelschi's arrest during a roundup of Romanian nationalists, and then his deportation to Pozsony. The Transylvanian union with Romania in 1918–1920 integrated Octavian's work into a more general project to develop a style of monumental painting that would bridge traditionalism and modern sensibilities. As noted by Abrudan, Smigelschi's example was followed by artists with more or less compatible tastes: Anastase Demian, Costin Petrescu, Cecilia Cuțescu-Storck, and Olga Greceanu. Of this group, Demian was actually involved in a lengthy process to restore and complete the murals at Sibiu Cathedral: after signing a contract in 1936, he was allowed to work on the project only in 1960–1962. His work upset church authorities, who asked Iosif Keber to take over and complete the project.

Overall, Smigelschi's work remains relatively unknown in Romania. Museologist Alexandru Chituță argues that this is because the communist regime of 1948–1989 had outlawed his Greek-Catholic Church, making references to him uncomfortable; and also because critics and historians were generally not based in the region were Smigelschi was most prolific. The other Smigelschis continued to be active in Romania, following the Transylvanian union. Smigelschi's son, Victor, was an architect noted for designing Blaj's Palace of Culture in 1930 and Satu Mare's old administrative palace (the "most important civil architecture building in interwar Transylvania") in 1935; he also contributed the Romanian pavilion at EXPO Paris 1937. He married the Italian Maria Anna Giuseppina Trinchieri; their progeny includes two daughters, both of whom are noted artists: ceramist Ioana Șetran and printmaker Ana-Maria Smigelschi.
