= Péter Tusor =

Hungarian historian

Péter Tusor (born 11 December 1967) is a professor of history at Pázmány Péter Catholic University, Hungary, where he specializes in church history. He is a doctor of the Hungarian Academy of Sciences (D.Sc.).

Tusor is also a scientific advisor and research group leader in the MTA-PPKE Vilmos Fraknói Vatican Historical Research Group.

== Education ==
He was born in Gödöllő in 1967. His native village was Tura in Pest County, where he completed his elementary studies, and then between 1982 and 1986 he was the student of the Piarist Secondary School of Kecskemét. From 1986 to 1988 he pursued theological studies in the Archiepiscopal Theological College of Eger and in the Pázmány Péter Academy of Theology. From 1989 to 1994 he studied history and Latin in the Faculty of Arts at Eötvös Loránd University. Between 1990 and 1996 he was a member of József Eötvös College. He attended the doctoral school of Eötvös Loránd University with a scholarship from 1994 to 1997, where he obtained his doctoral degree (Ph.D.) in history.

== Academic career ==
Since then he has been doing continual research in various archives – apart from the Hungarian ones – of Rome (Vatican), Italy and Vienna. In 2000, he submitted his dissertation with the title of The Unknown Chapters of the Hungarian Church Elite and Rome's Relations in 1607–1685; his supervisor was Ágnes R. Várkonyi. From 1999 to 2001 he taught Latin at Pázmány Péter Catholic University, and then in the autumn of 2001 he became a senior lecturer.

In 2007 he became an associate professor in the History Department. His habilitation was from literature and culture sciences at the University of Szeged in September 2012. His thesis for being a Doctor of Science was defended in May 2014 with the title of An “Episode” from the Relations of Hungary and the Roman Holy See, The Appointment of Péter Pázmány as the archbishop of Esztergom (A Micro-political study).

Since 2012, he has had a research group employing many research fellows, which is supported by the Hungarian Academy of Sciences. The name of his research group since 2017 is MTA-PPKE Vilmos Fraknói Vatican Historical Research Group. The early modern period (history of church, diplomacy, politics and culture), the history of the relations of Hungary and the Holy See, the historiography of the Hungarian research in the Vatican and the church history of philosophical attitudes of the 15–20th century are in the centre of his scientific interest.

As a professor he holds lectures, seminars and research seminars about the late Middle Ages to the 20th century on a graduate and post-graduate level. In number, he has 184 scientific publications. He established two series that he is still editing: the Collectanea Vaticana Hungariae from 2004, and the Collectanea Studiorum et Textuum from 2015. The former is an important forum of the methodical Hungarian research in the Vatican. It is also the heir of the Monumenta Vaticana Hungariae that was founded by Vilmos Fraknói.

== Professional service ==
He is a member of the editorial board of the Publikationen der ungarischen Geschichtsforschung in Vienna, which was founded by his initiative and active collaboration based on the sample of the Collectanea Vaticana Hungariae in 2009.

His studies were published in dignified Hungarian and international journals and annals. (For instance: Archivum Historiae Pontificiae, Quellen und Forschungen aus Italienischen Archiven und Bibliotheken, Römische Quartalschrift für Christliche Altertumskunde und Kirchengeschichte, Römische Historische Mitteilungen, Dall’Archivio Segreto Vaticano. Miscellanea di testi, saggi e inventari, Miscellanea Bibliothecae Apostolicae Vaticanae.) He participated in numerous Hungarian and international conferences (such as in Rome, Vienna, Madrid, Berlin and Prague).

He himself has organized many conferences, for instance the one in 2013, The Papacy and the local churches (16th–20th centuries) with the participation of many foreign researchers.

His outstanding scientific work in the field of church history was honoured by the Hungarian state with the Vilmos Fraknói Prize in 2016.
