= Arthur Coulin =

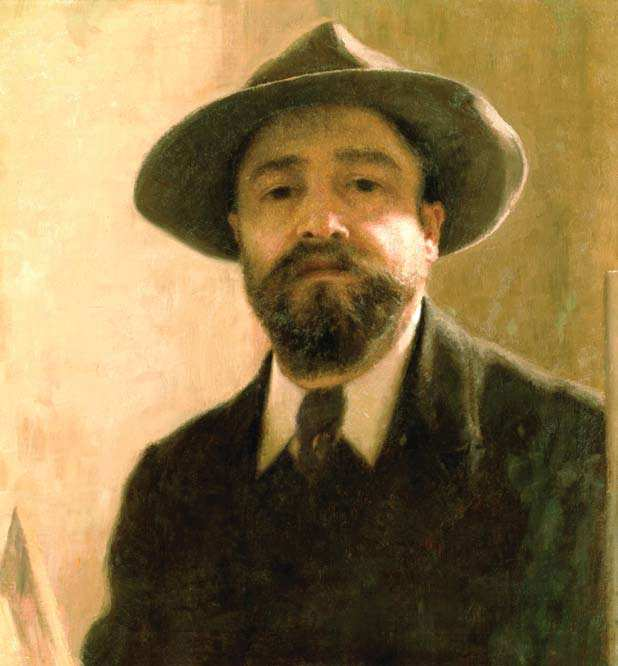
Self-portrait (c. 1910)

Arthur Coulin (20 September 1869 – 9 November 1912) was an Austro-Hungarian Romanian painter and art critic.

== Biography ==
He was born in Nagyszeben, Austria-Hungary (now Sibiu, Romania) to an illustrious family of French origin. His father, Nikolaus, was a prominent lawyer who died when Arthur was only eleven. After that, his mother raised the family at the home of her father, a local judge. Arthur and his three siblings all dabbled in art and showed talent at an early age, but he was the only one who chose it as a career, against his mother's wishes.

He enrolled at the Lutheran High School (now the Samuel von Brukenthal National College), where he studied with Carl Dörschlag. After graduating, in 1888, he participated in a local exhibition, then entered the "School of Arts and Crafts" in Graz. The following year, he transferred to the Academy of Fine Arts, Munich where his primary professor was Gabriel von Hackl. Later, he studied with Ludwig von Löfftz, but had to return to Sibiu in 1891 for lack of funds.

In 1892, he moved to Budapest, where he found work in a photography studio. He also met the violinist Olga Fogarascher (1875–1959), whom he would marry in 1897. The following year, he obtained a state scholarship and began spending time at the artists' colony in Baia Mare. A new grant from the government came in 1900, enabling him to travel to Italy and work at the colony in Cervara di Roma. After returning, he settled in Brașov to work with Friedrich Miess. In 1904, he and Octavian Smigelschi collaborated in creating murals for the Holy Trinity Cathedral in Sibiu. Three years later, he became a major contributor to a new cultural magazine, Die Karpathen.

Early in 1912, he underwent two surgeries for cancer. He attempted to continue travelling, exhibiting and completing his commissions, but died later that year in Heidelberg.

== Selected paintings ==
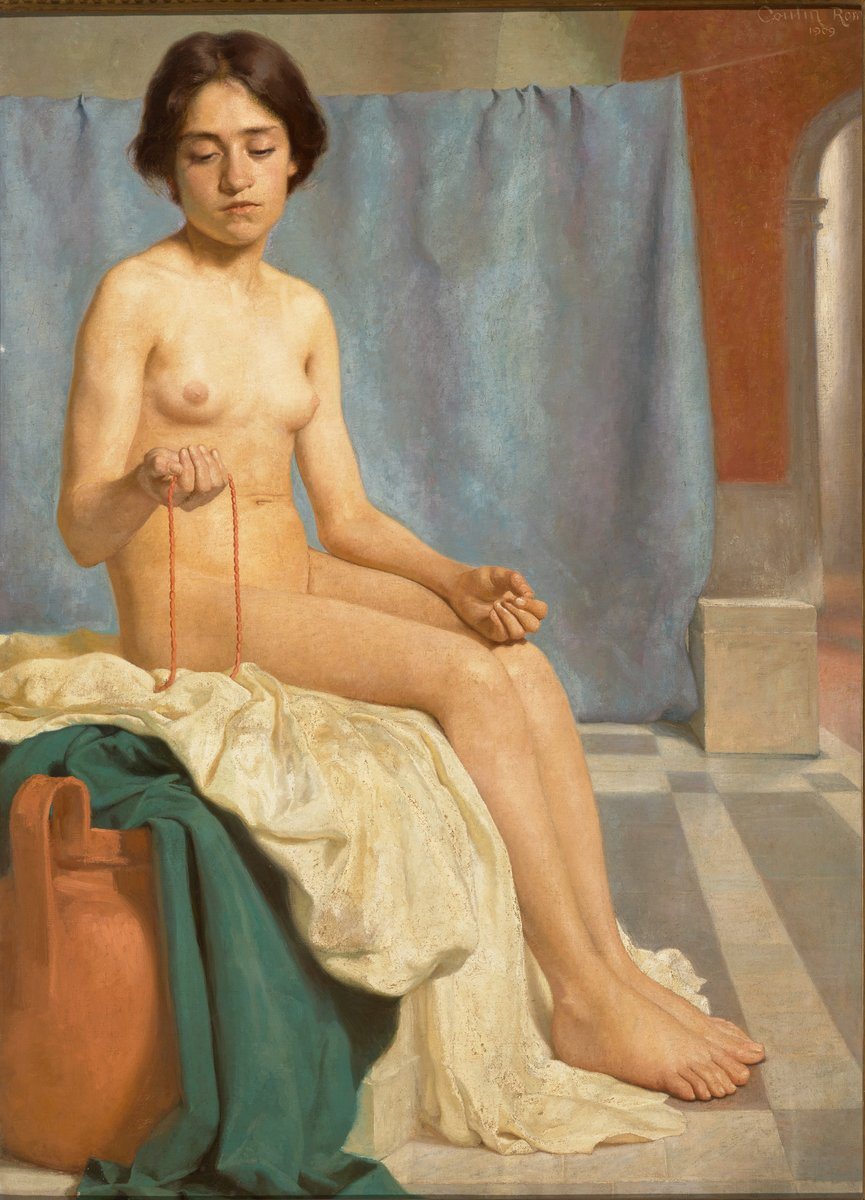
Girl with a
String of Coral

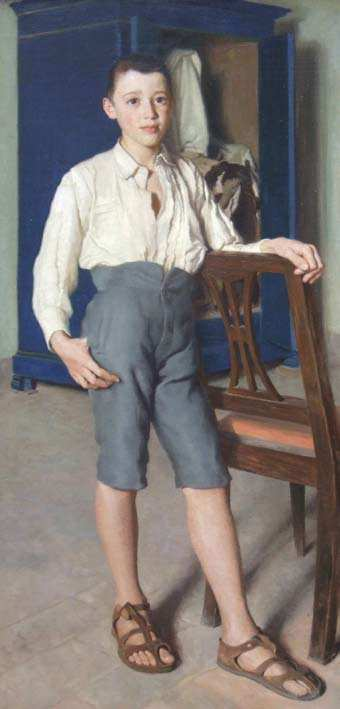
The Painter's Son

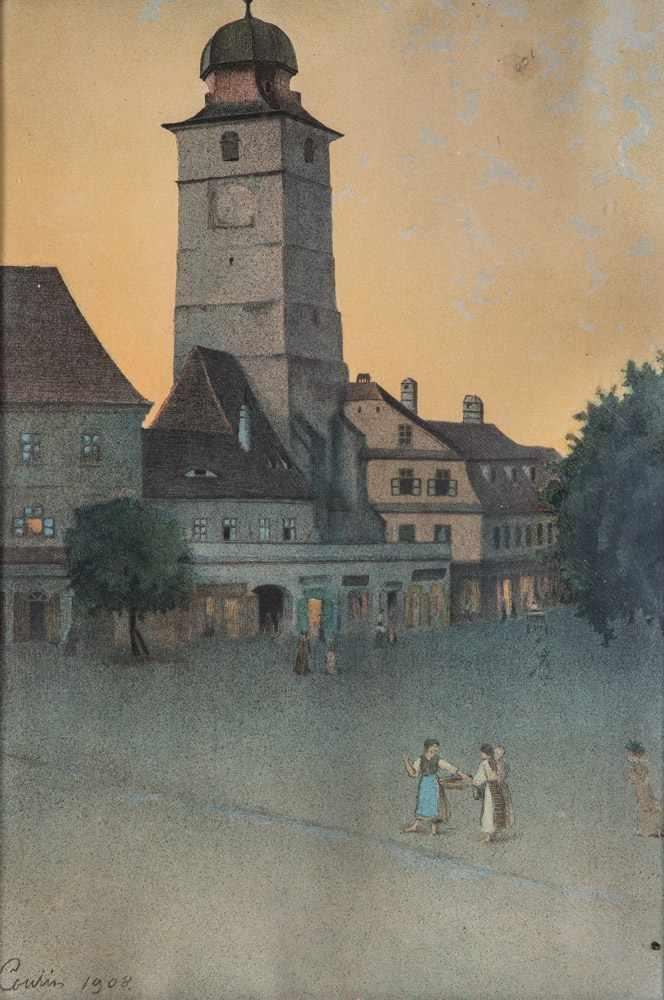
Council Tower in Sibiu

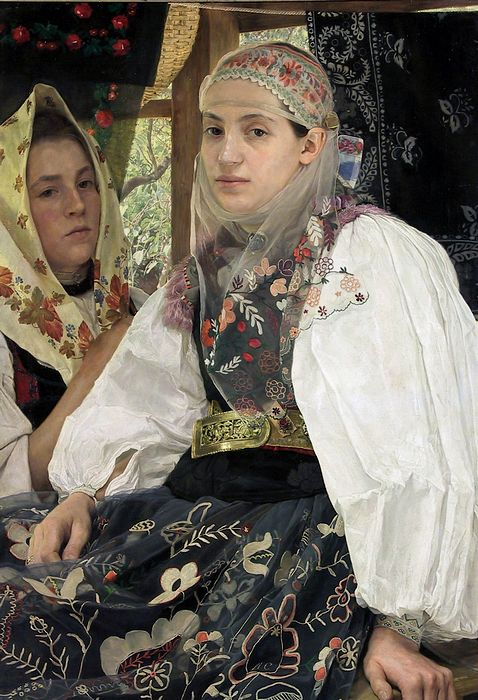
Peasant Women
in Bârsa

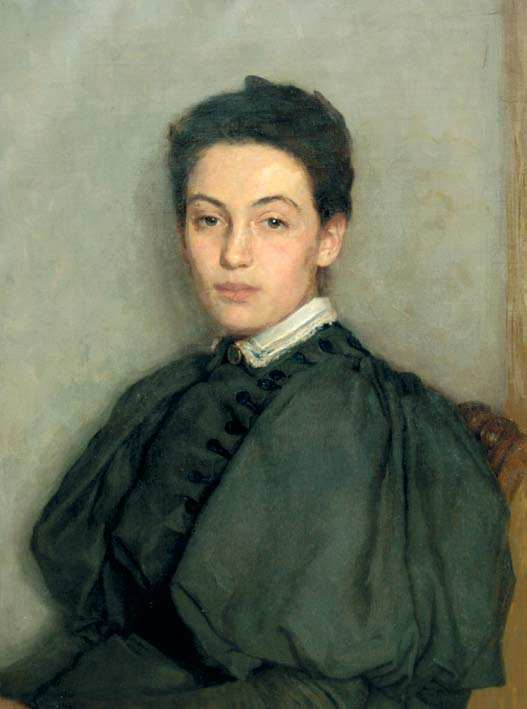
Portrait of his wife, Olga
