= Holy Trinity Cathedral, Sibiu =

Romanian religious building

Holy Trinity Cathedral
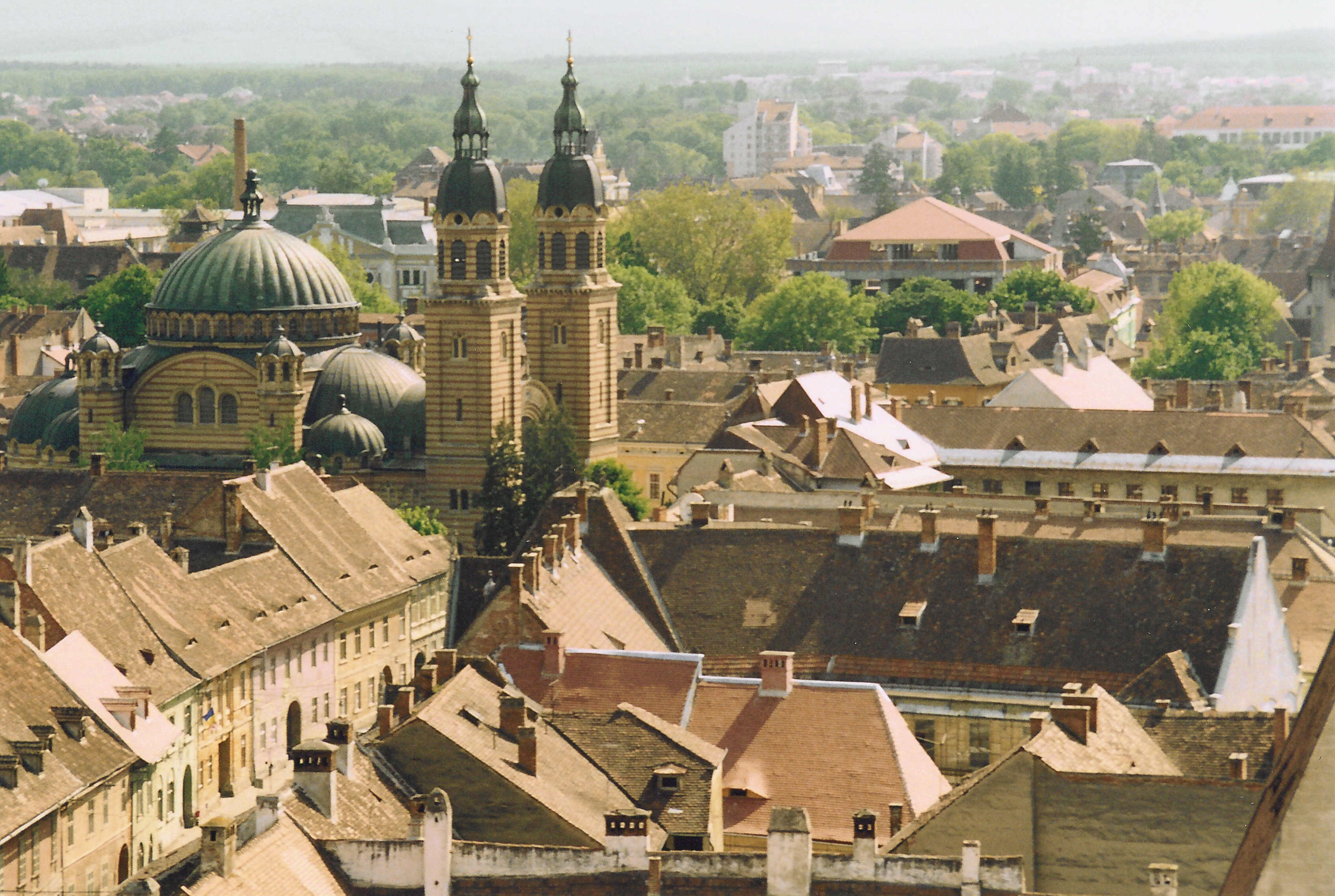
- Side view

Religion
- Affiliation: Romanian Orthodox Church
- District: Metropolitan of Transylvania

Location
- Location: Sibiu, Sibiu County, Romania
- Interactive map of Holy Trinity Cathedral
- Coordinates: 45.794523°N 24.148207°E

Architecture
- Style: Byzantine Revival
- Groundbreaking: 1902
- Completed: 1904
- Materials: Brick, concrete

The Holy Trinity Cathedral, Sibiu (Romanian: Catedrala Sfânta Treime din Sibiu), located at 35 Mitropoliei Street, Sibiu, Romania, is the seat of the Romanian Orthodox Archbishop of Sibiu and Metropolitan of Transylvania. It was built in the style of a Byzantine basilica, inspired by Hagia Sophia, with the main spires influenced by Transylvanian church architecture and Baroque elements.

The idea of building an Orthodox cathedral in Sibiu began with Metropolitan Andrei Șaguna, who in the autumn of 1857 asked Emperor Franz Joseph I for permission to send a circular to his diocese requesting that priests and laymen give donations. He sent the letter before Christmas that year, and the first donor was the Emperor himself, who gave 1000 gold coins, followed by the governor of Transylvania with 50, Șaguna with 2000 florins, and many others. Donations continued to come in following Șaguna's death in 1873; the cornerstone was laid on 18 August 1902, when Ioan Mețianu was Metropolitan. In order to free the space to build the cathedral (which took up five lots on Mitropoliei Street and three on Xenopol Street, where it also has an entrance), eight nearby houses had to be demolished, as well as the little Greek church built in 1797-1799 that had heretofore served as a cathedral.

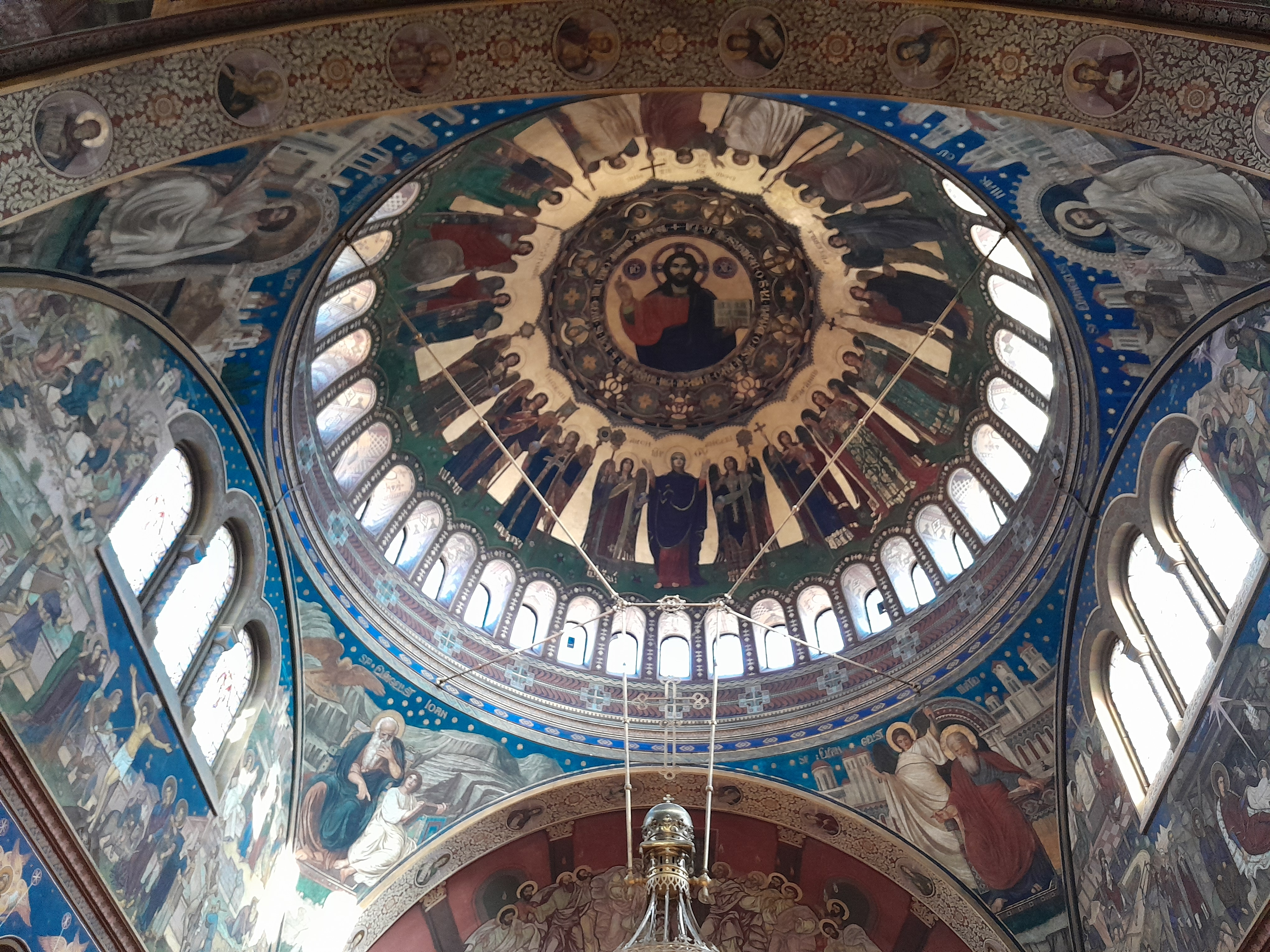
Interior

Work, coordinated by city architect Iosif Schussnig, began in 1902 and was finished in 1904, when the copper roof was done. The plan, by Virgil Nagy and Iosif Kamner of Budapest, was chosen from among designs submitted by 31 mainly Austrian and Hungarian architects. On 13 December 1904, the four bells were blessed and placed in the two main spires (during World War I, the Austro-Hungarian Army melted the three bells in the western spire for use as cannons; these were not replaced until 1926). The iconostasis and kliros were then manufactured at Constantin Babic's firm in Bucharest; electric lighting was also installed. The iconostasis (of gilt carved wood) and dome (showing Christ Pantocrator flanked by angels) were painted by Octavian Smigelschi, from the nearby village of Ludoș.

The exterior is in red and yellow brick. The spacious nave is bordered by smaller spherical roofs and four towers: two smaller octagonal ones, and two larger ones near the entrance with a square base that becomes octagonal in the bell area. The ends of the towers are shaped like double bulbs, with a skylight in the centre. The main entrance is through a portico with three semicircular doors. Behind this and between the main towers is an ample semicircular vestibule with a similarly shaped stained-glass window, while the outside is decorated with round mosaics showing Jesus and the Four Evangelists. The cathedral is 53.10m long and 25.40m wide in the centre, the dome 24.70m high (34.70m on the exterior) and 15m in diameter, while the spires are 43m high (45m including the crosses).

On 30 April 1906, Metropolitan Mețianu, joined by his suffragan bishop from Arad, Ioan Papp, and a group of priests and deacons, consecrated the cathedral. Nicolae Iorga was also present; he donated a silver engolpion and a valuable icon. Since its dedication, the cathedral has undergone a number of restorations and improvements: the walls have been decorated with neo-Byzantine paintings by Iosif Keber and Anastase Demian, and liturgical objects, vestments, books and a sound system have all been added. Divine Liturgy and Vespers take place daily, as well as other services when provided for.

== Gallery ==
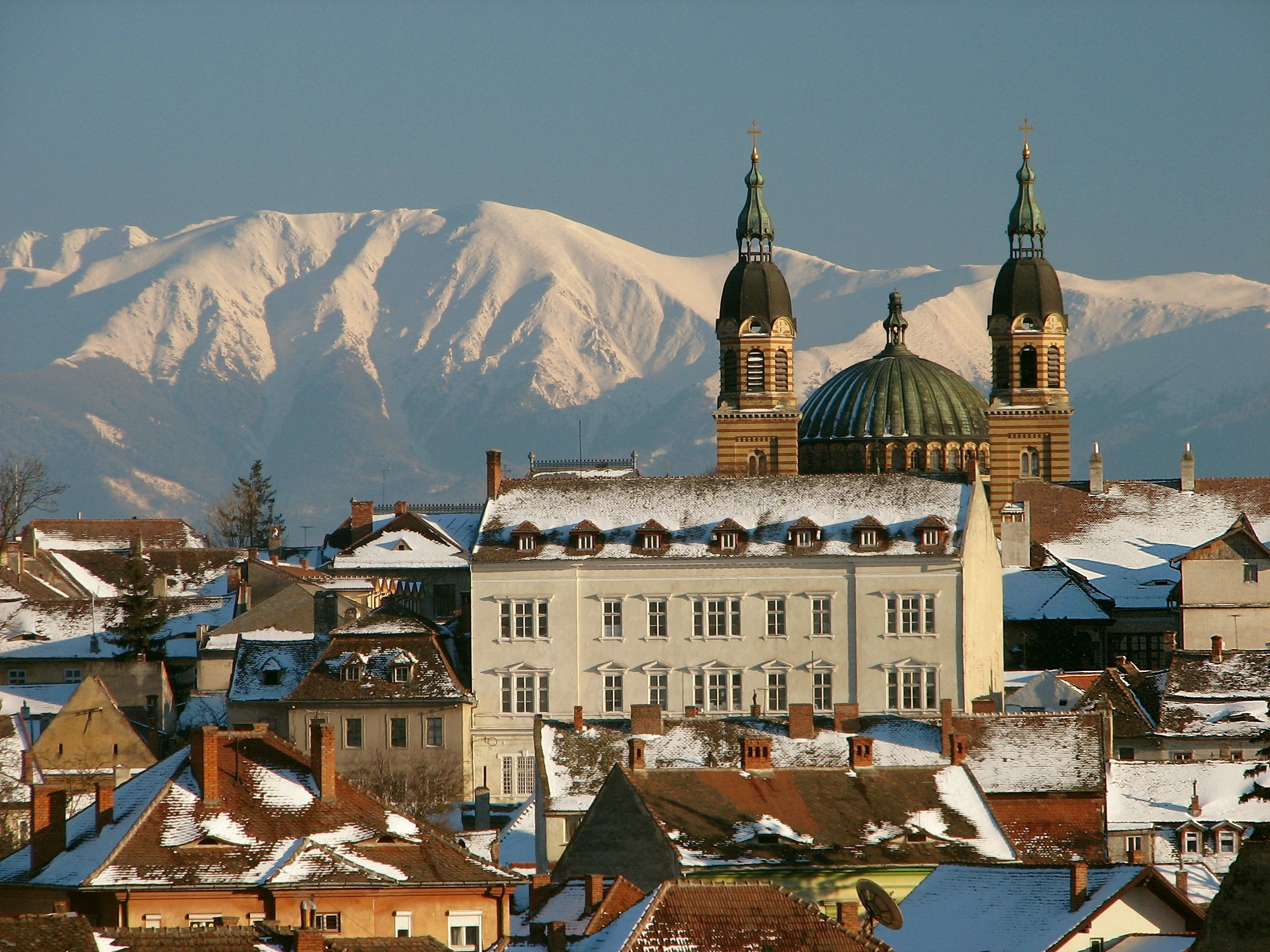
The cathedral in winter

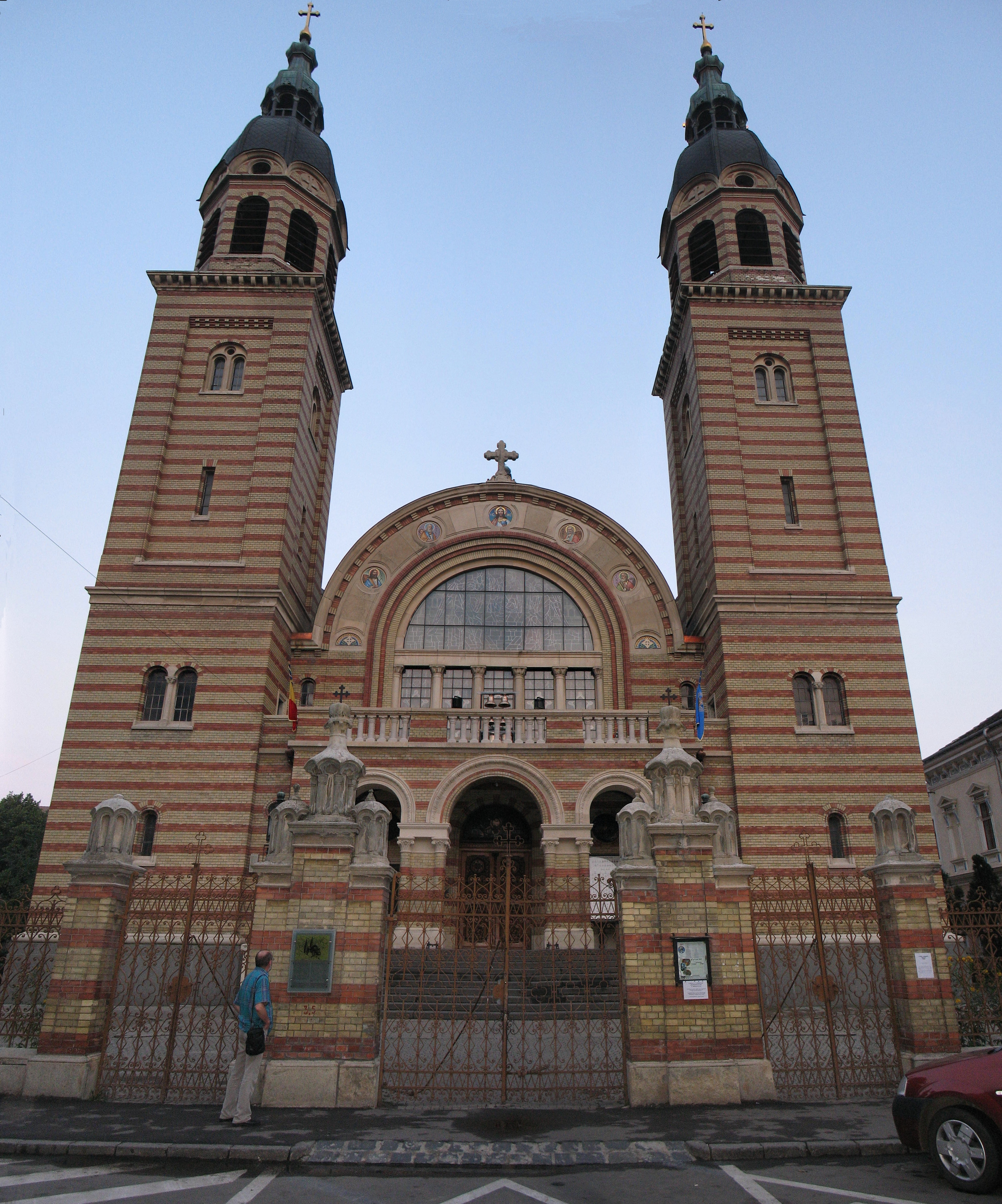
Main entrance

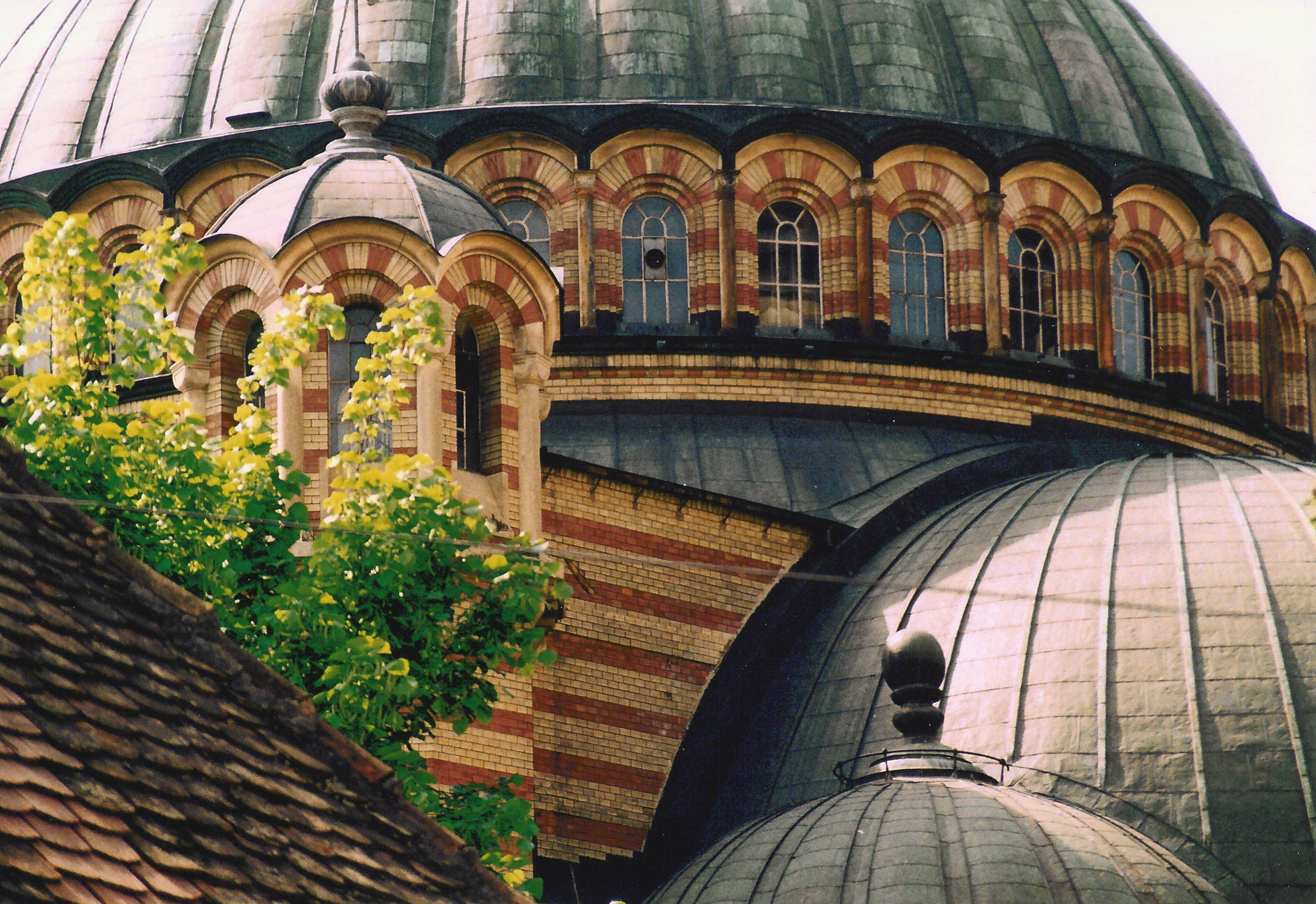
Detail: main dome, smaller towers, side roofs

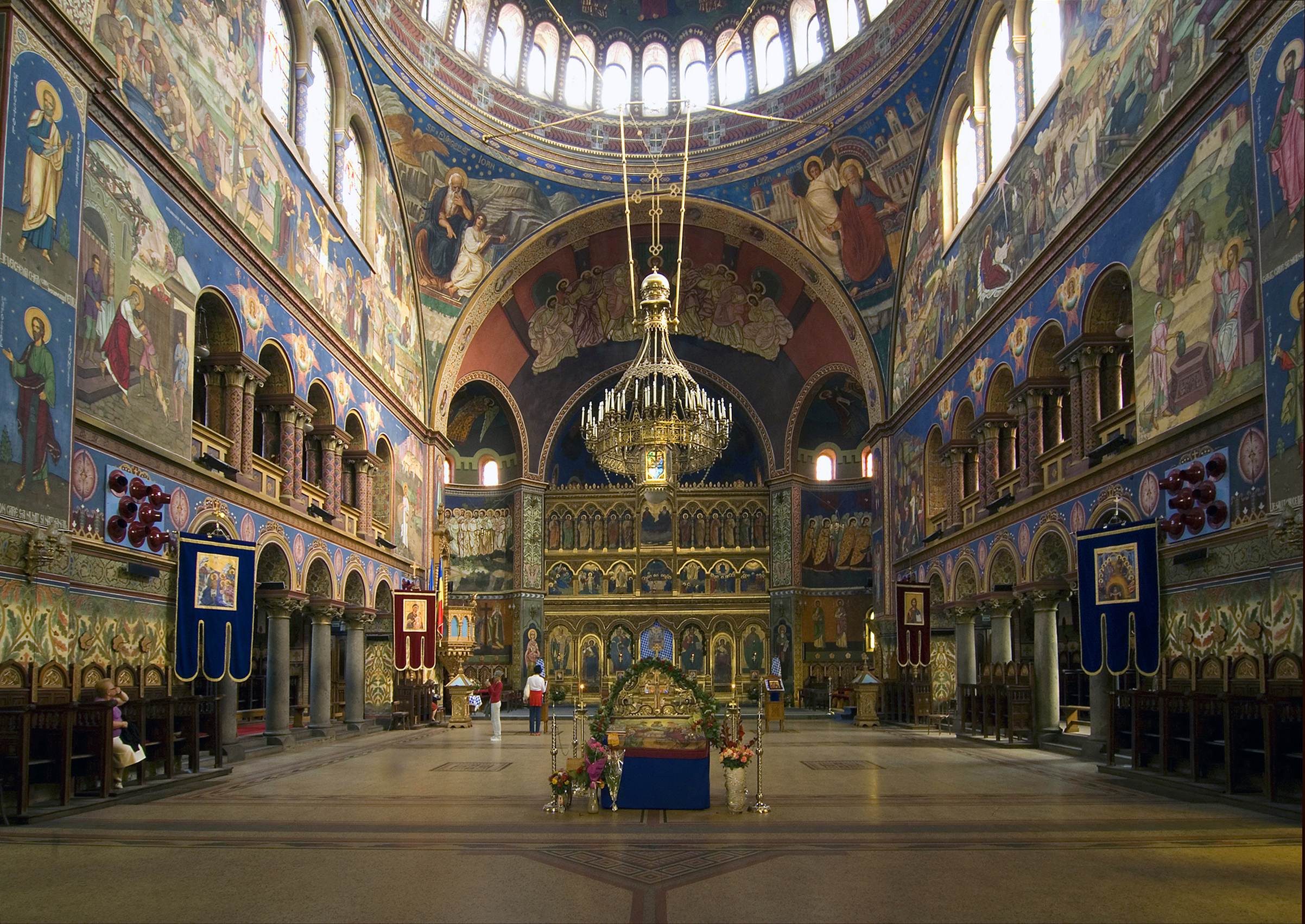
Nave and iconostasis

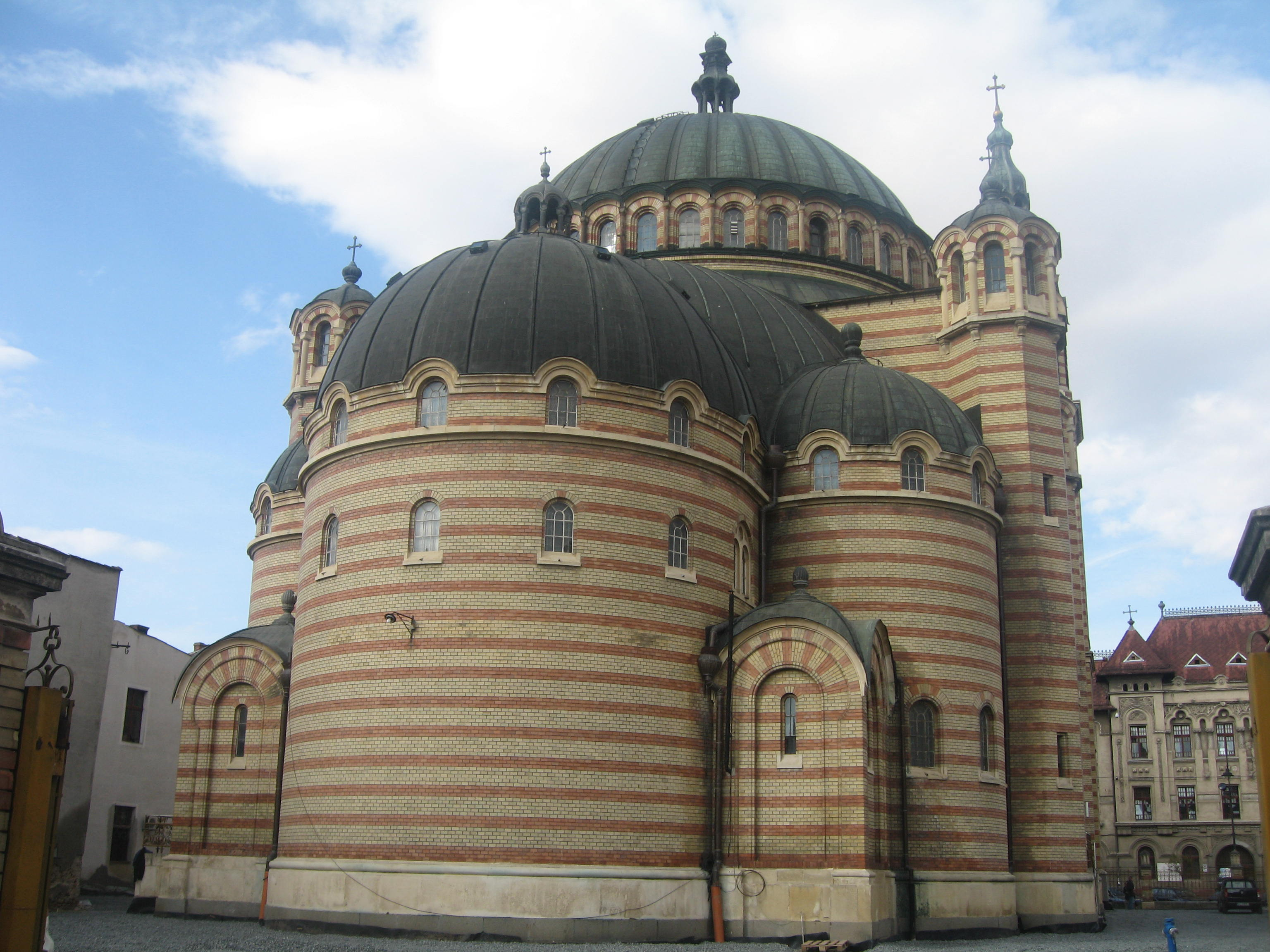
Nave exterior

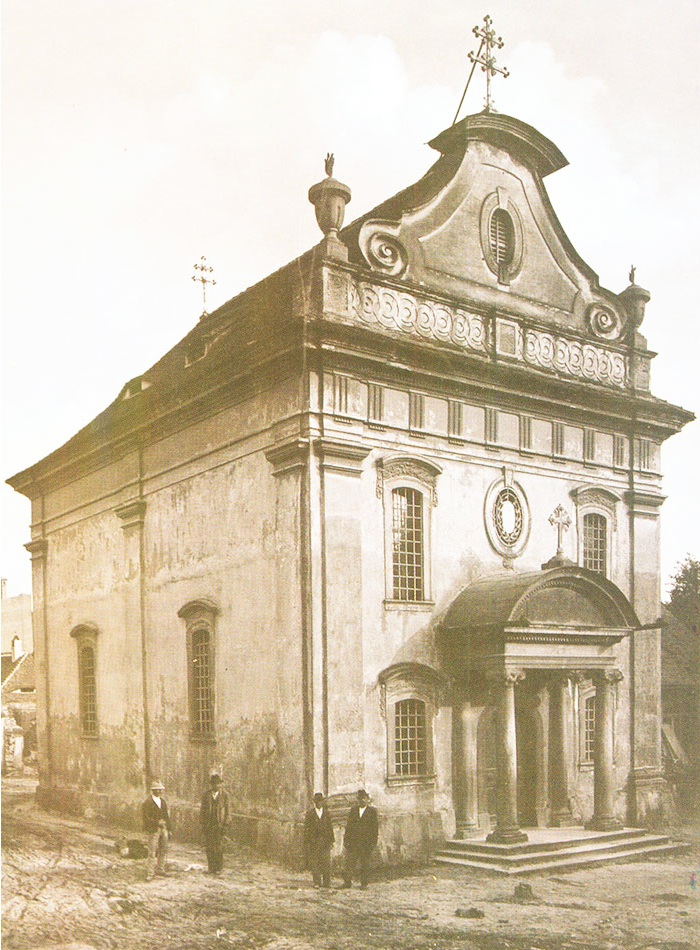
The old cathedral

The illuminated facade at night
