= Ludoș =

- Commune
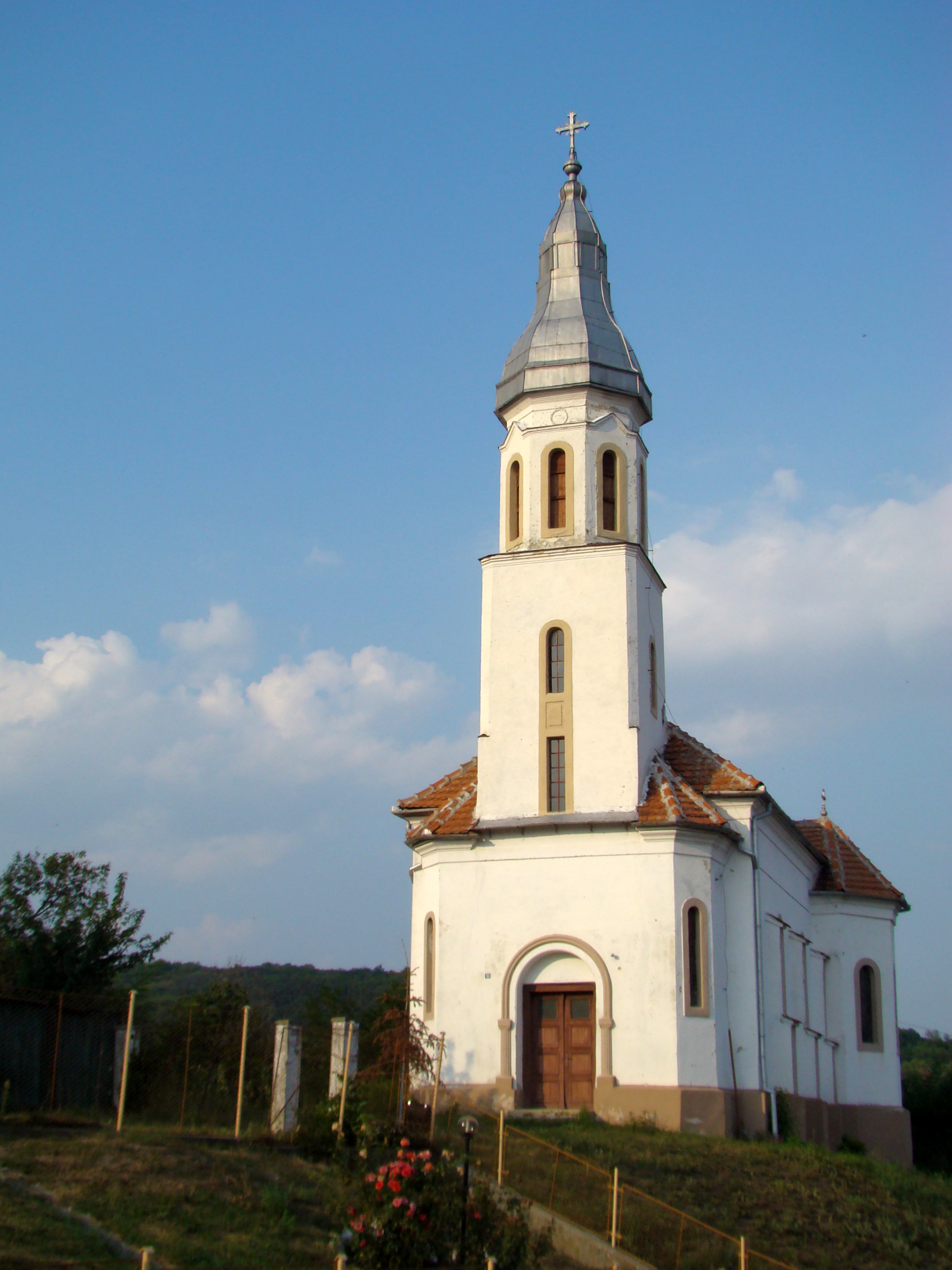
- Church in Ludoș

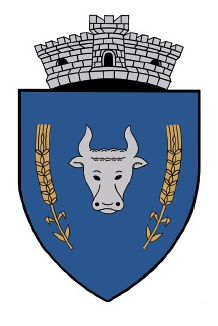
- Coat of arms

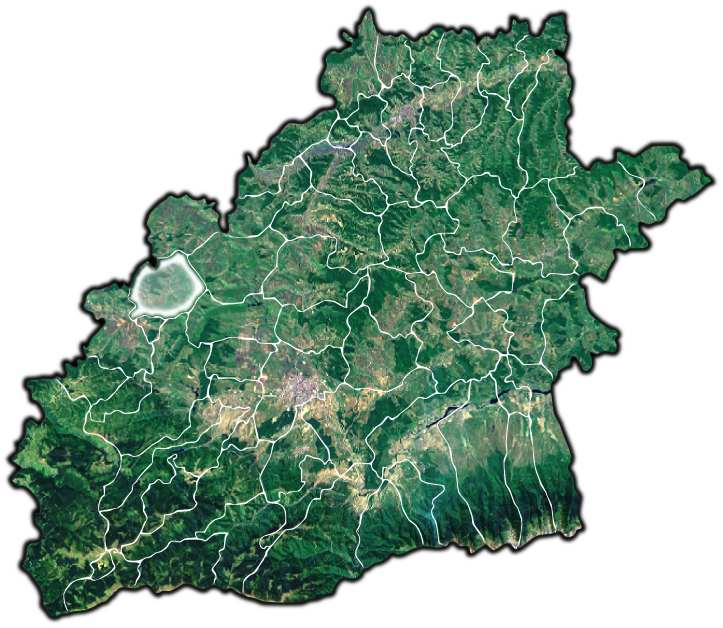
- Location in Sibiu County

- Location in Romania
- Coordinates: 45°55′N 23°54′E
- Country: Romania
- County: Sibiu

Government
  - Mayor (2020–2024): Ilie Berghezan (PNL)
- Area: 43.37 km^{2} (16.75 sq mi)
- Elevation: 348 m (1,142 ft)
- Population (2021-12-01): 584
  - Density: 13.5/km^{2} (34.9/sq mi)
- Time zone: UTC+02:00 (EET)
  - Summer (DST): UTC+03:00 (EEST)
- Postal code: 557130
- Area code: (+40) 02 69
- Vehicle reg.: SB
- Website: comunaludos.ro

Ludoș (German: Grosslogdes; Hungarian: Nagyludas; Transylvanian Saxon dialect: Logdes) is a commune located in Sibiu County, Transylvania, Romania, bordering Alba County. It is composed of two villages, Gusu (Giesshübel; Kisludas; Gäszhiwel) and Ludoș.

The commune is situated on the Transylvanian Plateau, on the banks of the river Secaș. It is located in the western part of Sibiu County, 33 km (21 mi) northwest of the county seat, Sibiu.

Historical population
Year	Pop.	±%
1850	2,734	—
1920	3,431	+25.5%
1941	3,058	−10.9%
1966	2,158	−29.4%
1992	930	−56.9%
2002	794	−14.6%
2011	746	−6.0%
2021	548	−26.5%
Source: INS, Census data

== Natives ==
- Octavian Smigelschi (1866 – 1912), painter and printmaker
