= Hungarian art =

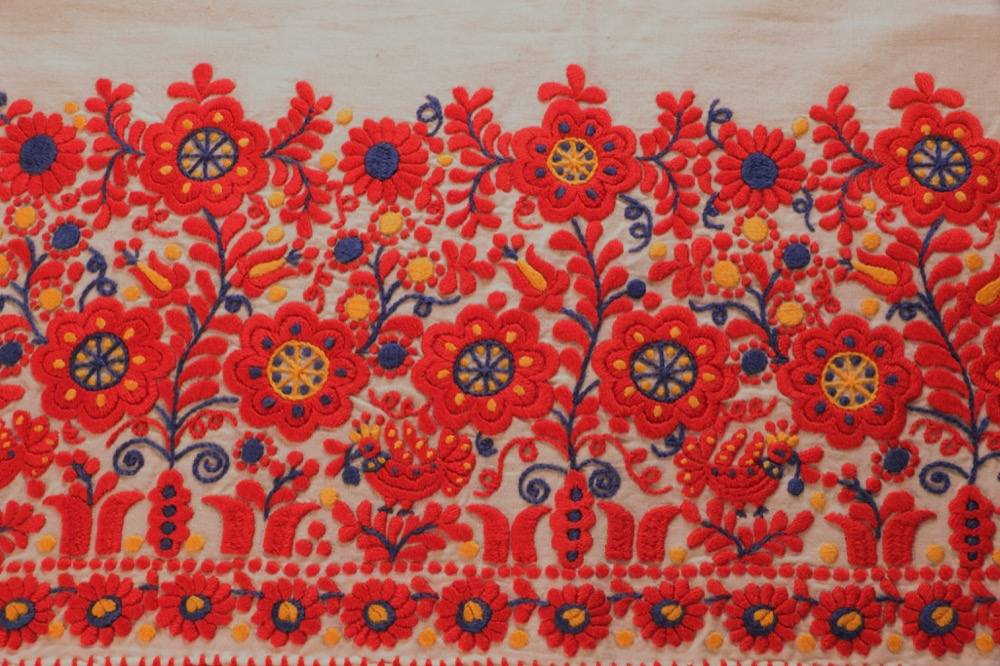
Embroidered Hungarian folk art

Hungarian art stems from the period of the conquest of the Carpathian basin by the people of Árpád in the 9th century. Prince Árpád also organized earlier people settled in the area.

== Horsemen in the Carpathian basin ==
Before the arrival of Árpád, several other peoples who migrated westward on the Eurasian Steppe had founded states in the Carpathian basin. The capital of the Huns (Xiongnu in Chinese) was Buda, named after King Attila's brother, though Priscus rhetor, a 5th-century historian and ambassador of the Byzantine Empire stated that the capital of the Huns was in the plains between the Danube and Tisza rivers. After the death of Attila in 453 the Lombards and Gepids, and later the Avars founded states here (569). This late Avar kingdom was defeated by the Franks, and the Avars of Transdanubia were baptised. The first Hungarians came to the basin during the late 9th century.

Tulip motifs are the oldest floral motif in Hungarian folk art, predating the Hungarians’ arrival to the Carpathian basin. Today, they are prominent in traditional Hungarian painted furniture, embroidery and wood carving.

== Art of the Conquest period ==
The People of Árpád in the 9th century used ornamental motifs to decorate both their dress and the trappings of their horses, the main motif being the palmette (see the above illustration). This style remained important in Hungary from the 9th to the 11th centuries, and similar motifs can be found in the contemporary decorative arts of the Caucasus, Iran and Middle-Asia.

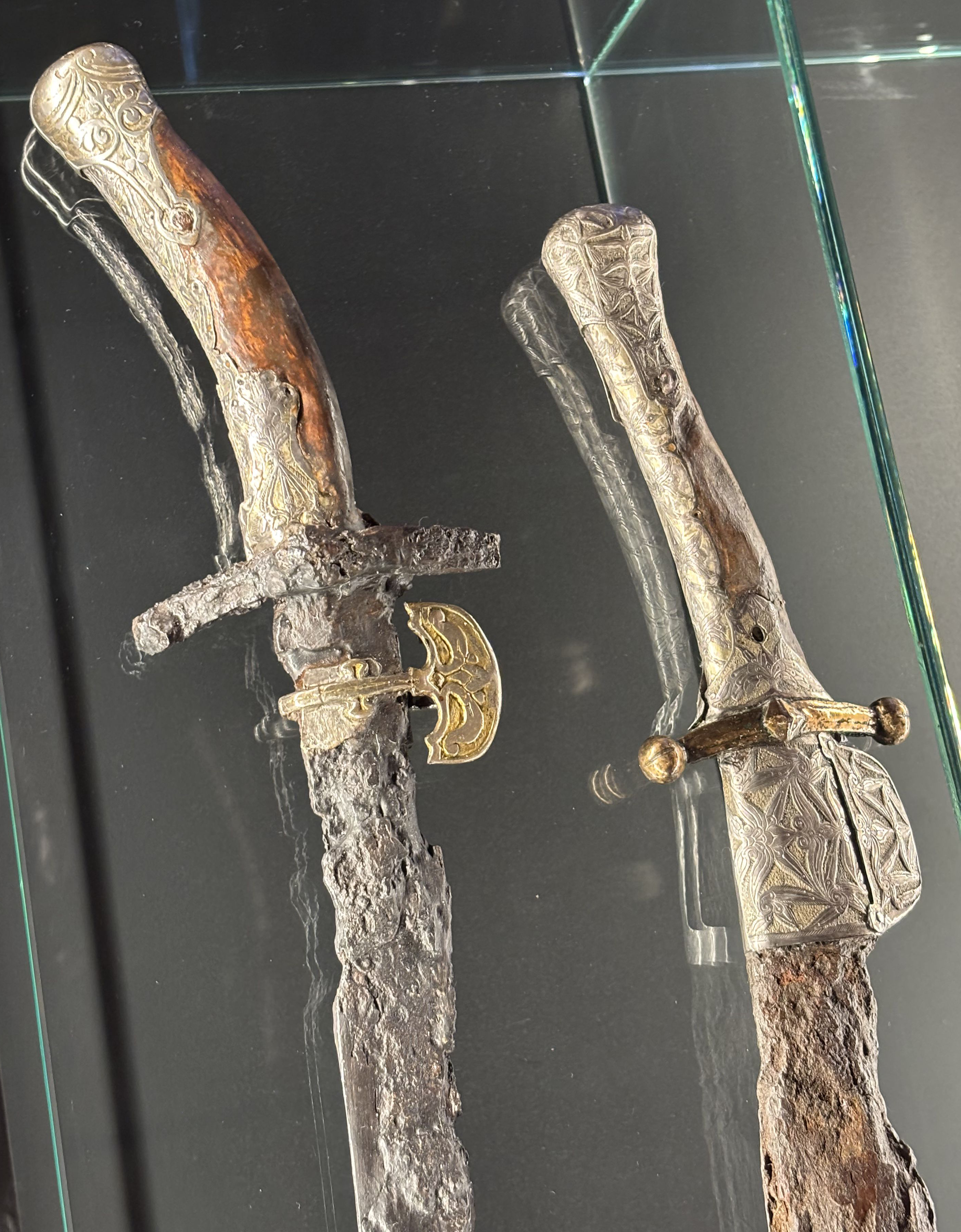
Hungarian sabers from the Hungarian conquest period (10th century)

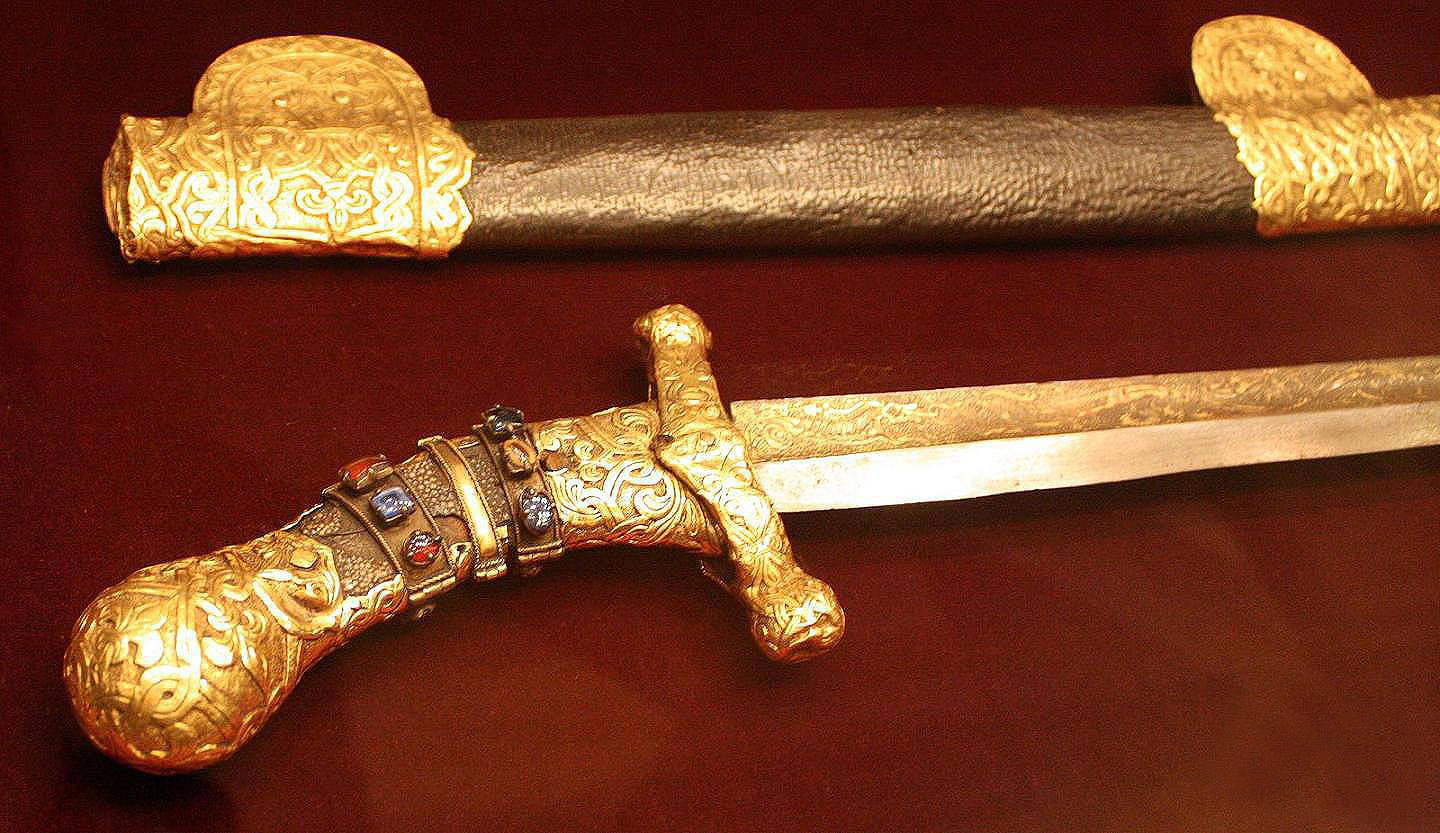
During the reign of King Solomon of Hungary, in the autumn of 1063, Queen Mother Anastasia presented a richly decorated sabre to Otto of Nordheim, Duke of Bavaria. This weapon was esteemed in the Hungarian royal court as the Sword of Attila. According to the Kunsthistorisches Museum, actually a Hungarian sabre from the first half of the 10th.

Hungarian sabretache plates from the Hungarian conquest period (10th-century)

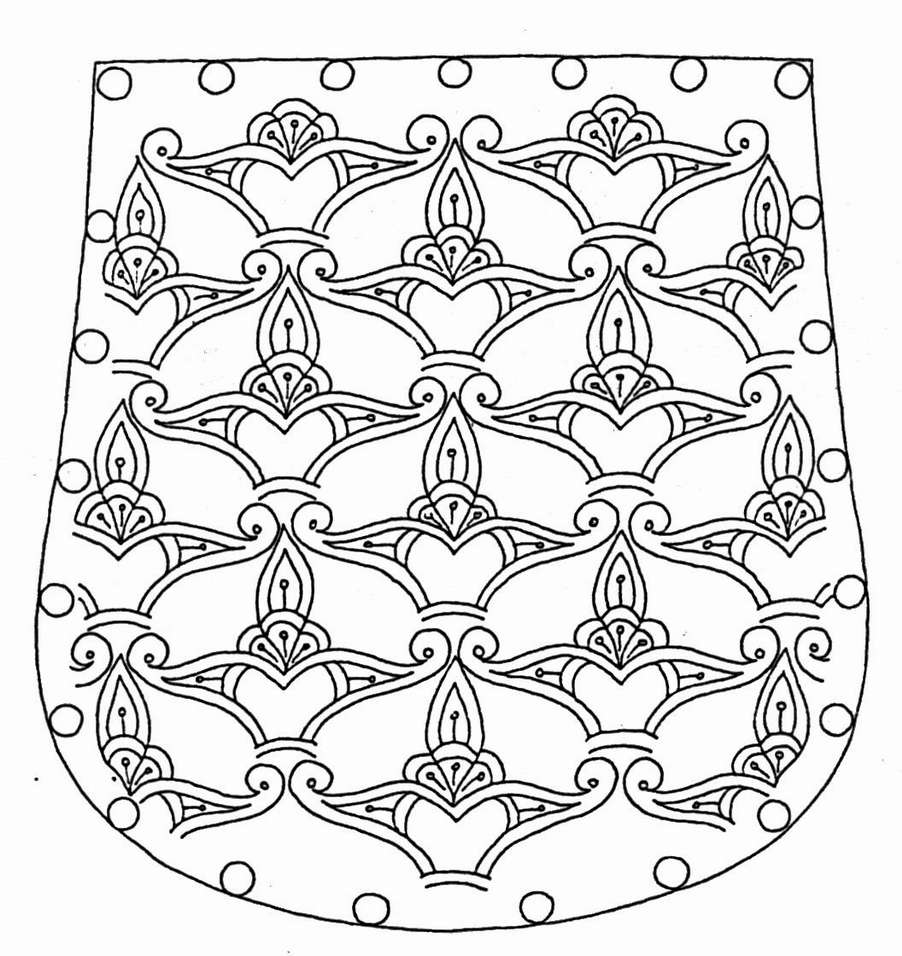
One of the most characteristic decorative motifs is the palmette style as on this sabretache plate

Hungarian gilded silver hair braid discs from the Hungarian conquest period (10th-century)

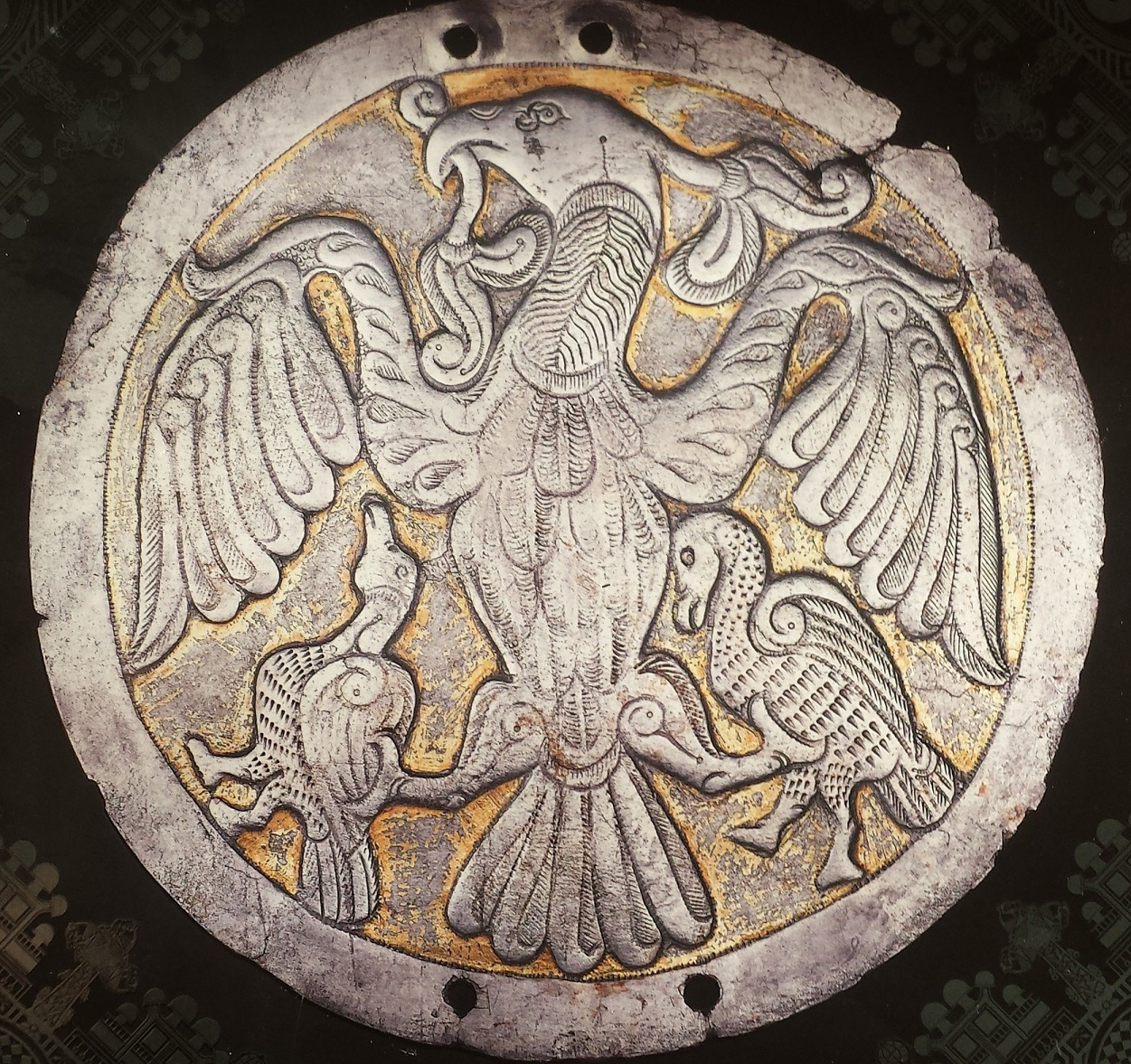
Gilt silver hair braid disc with motive of mythic Turul bird. The most beautiful adornment worn by noble Hungarian women was a pair of ornate discs hanging from the ends of their braids. (10th-century)

== Art during the Arpád era ==
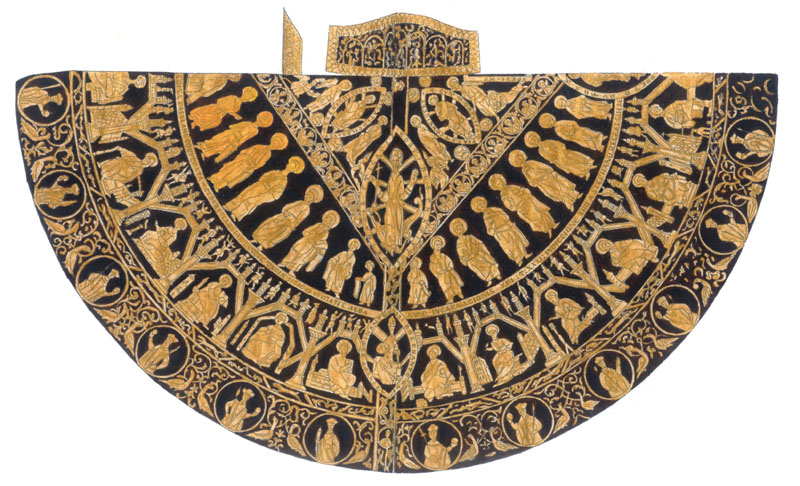
The coronation mantle of Hungary from the time of King Stephen I of Hungary, reigned 1000-1038 A. D.

Descendants of Prince Árpád organized the medieval Hungarian Kingdom. During this period the combination of styles originating in the steppes with those of the European Romanesque produced a rich heritage, with noticeable parallels in the art of the Scandinavian Vikings and the Celts of Western Europe. The coronation mantle of King Stephen (crowned 1000 A. D.) is a particularly fine example from this period.

== Late Middle Ages ==
The 147 pictures of the Illuminated Chronicle (1358) represent a large source of information on medieval Hungarian cultural history, the artistic style of the royal court of King Louis I of Hungary. The codex is a unique source of art, medieval and cultural history.

== Ottoman influence ==
The Ottoman Empire had a significant and lasting influence on Hungarian art, particularly as a result of Ottoman rule, but also through regional trade, diplomacy, migration and cultural exchange. Influences are particularly present in Hungarian embroidery, carpets and rugs, ceramics, metalwork, and other decorative arts.

Hungarian embroideries of the 17th and 18th centuries were closely related to Turkish embroideries, with pronounced similarities in the motifs used.

== Western influence ==
Painting, particularly ecclesiastical painting, in Hungary was popularised during the reigns of the royal houses of Anjou and Luxembourg. Both houses esteemed the earlier king Ladislaus I of the former Arpád Dynasty. Sigismund of Luxemburg, King of Hungary and Holy Roman Emperor was buried in the cathedral of Nagyvárad (in present-day Oradea, Romania) at the side of King Ladislaus. Even today, after so many wars and so much destruction, there are about fifty churches where murals of the Saint Ladislaus legend can be found.

A 12th-century Maiestas Domini relief, the Tabán Christ, is an important example of the influence of Italian and French ecclesiastical art in the Kingdom of Hungary.

== See also ==
- Architecture of Hungary
- Anjou Legendarium
