= Vilmos Fraknói =

Hungarian historian (1843–1924)

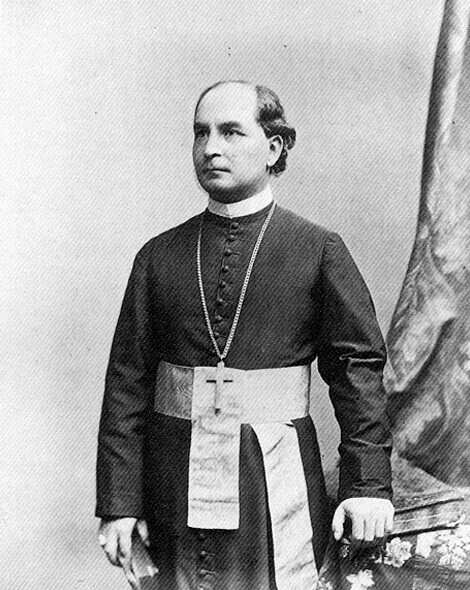
Vilmos Fraknói

Vilmos Fraknói (27 February 1843 – 20 November 1924) was a Hungarian historian. He was an expert in Hungarian ecclesiastical history.

== Life ==
Vilmos Fraknói (originally Vilmos Frankl) came from a Jewish family of Ürmény (today Mojmírovce, Slovakia). He studied Roman Catholic theology and philosophy, and was ordained a priest in 1865. He followed a successful ecclesial career: became canon of Nagyvárad in 1878, titular abbot of Szekszárd in 1879 and titular bishop of Arbe in 1892.

Fraknói began studying Hungarian history at an early age. He published his first work in 1868, at the age of 25, about the life of Péter Pázmány – the greatest figure of Hungarian Counter-Reformation – in three volumes. He wrote about other famous Catholic personalities, like János Vitéz and Tamás Bakócz, the Renaissance archbishops of Esztergom, works written in 1879 and 1889.

In 1875 Fraknói was appointed guardian of the Hungarian National Museum. He became the supervisor of all Hungarian museums and libraries in 1897. From 1870 onwards Fraknói was a member of the Hungarian Academy of Sciences, and held important positions in the Hungarian academic life. Fraknói established the Hungarian Historical Institute in Rome.

== Work ==
As a historian, Fraknói was revered for his knowledge of the Hungarian-related documents in the main European archives, especially the archives of Rome, Vienne, Florence, Venice, Naples, Milan, Paris, Munich, Berlin, Kraków, The Hague and Copenhagen. He was a member of several international scientific societies.

Fraknói was the editor of several important series:

- Értekezések a történettudományok köréből ("Historical Dissertations")
- Magyar Országgyűlési Emlékek ("Sources of Hungarian Parliamentary History")
- Monumenta Vaticana

A facsimile edition of the Buda Chronica was published in 1900 by Gusztáv Ranschburg, an introductory study was provided by historian Bishop Vilmos Fraknói.

His other famous works are about King Louis II of Hungary (1878), the age of the Hunyadis and Jagiellos (1896), István Werbőczy (1899) and Ignác Martinovics (1921).
