= Marsia Alexander-Clarke =

Chilean-born American video installation artist

Marsia Alexander-Clark
- Born: 1939 (age 86–87); Valparaíso, Chile
- Education: Claremont Graduate University; Art Students League of New York; Park College
- Known for: Video installation
- Website: videoasmark.com

Marsia Alexander-Clarke is an American video installation artist. She is a Guggenheim Fellow.

== Personal life and education ==
Marsia Alexander-Clarke was born in 1939 in Valparaíso, Chile. Her parents were missionaries from the United States. Due to personal and family reasons, Alexander-Clarke rarely attended elementary school and instead roamed Valparaiso and the surrounding countryside alone. She now credits this time, and her international upbringing more broadly, as important in shaping her artistic voice: insular, observant, on the outside looking in.

Alexander-Clarke moved to the United States to attend high school in 1952. She obtained her Bachelor of Arts at Park College in Kansas City. Subsequently, she studied at the Art Students League of New York, The New School, the New York Studio School of Drawing, Painting and Sculpture, and also privately with Ethel Schwabacher from 1962 to 1968. In 1970 she moved to California, and in 1974 obtained her Master of Fine Arts from Claremont Graduate School.

For several years, Marsia spent long periods of time in Europe, Africa, Australia, New Zealand and also Chile and Argentina. Along with her early experiences in Chile, she states that these travels have greatly influenced her work.

"I hope to convey a non-verbal sensation of grandeur paired to a sense of intimate silence. This is a sensation I experienced walking alone in the wilderness while traveling for a year in western Australia. It is a sensation similar to the half empty space of the large Romanesque church I attended in my childhood in Chile, South America. Yet my restless self also seeks disruption; to create something new and unexpected."

Currently, she lives and works in Altadena, California.

== Artistic career ==
Still shot of High Flyin' Bird by Alexander-Clarke, 2002, single-channel video.

=== Early sculptural work ===
Alexander-Clarke originally studied painting. During her time at Claremont Graduate School her high relief paintings on paper gradually became three-dimensional. One year after obtaining her Master of Fine Arts she was accepted at MacDowell Colony in New Hampshire for a two-month scholarship residency. Upon returning to California, she continued to develop her sculptural work.

In the 1970s and 80s, Alexander-Clarke exhibited her sculptural pieces in the United States and internationally. These included, for example, exhibitions at the Baxter Art Gallery in Pasadena, California in 1980 and the Heide Park and Art Gallery (now known as the Heide Museum of Modern Art) in Melbourne, Australia in 1986. She described her sculptures of this time (which were constructed from brown wrapping paper and tape, and eventually, wood and canvas) as "nomadic"; Alexander-Clarke installed the sculptures in nature, photographed them and then exhibited them in galleries, calling their gallery placement "dormant." In her own words:

"My early work in sculpture, dealt with structures, which explored rhythmic repetition and a dialogue between outside and inside environments. Sets of sculptures were placed in natural settings, photographed and then exhibited in a gallery, at times collapsed as "dormant" forms. I called these "Nomadic Sculptures". Anthropology, documentation and packaging were inferred. Process art influenced my choice of materials: rolled craft paper and masking tape."

=== Video Art ===
In the late 1980's, Alexander-Clarke attended video art and poetry workshops at Studio X productions at the Pasadena Community Access Corporation in Pasadena, California. Since then she has worked with video as her primary medium. Influenced by minimalism in painting and music, including artists such as Agnes Martin, Alexander-Clarke developed a method for creating her video work, one which uses small fragments of recorded material that she calls "marks".

The source videos for these "marks" are made during Alexander-Clark's travels around California and Chile; she then crops, layers and abstracts them to create complex visual tapestries. The term "marks" refers to the mid-20th century, when artists associated with modernist movements such as Abstract Expressionism and Art Informel began to use minimal gestures and materials to create highly expressive abstract work. As Alexander-Clarke writes:

I call my video – video as mark – in loose reference to the marks found in drawing and painting. In using video marks I build a language that extends the aesthetics of painting, forming a bridge between painting and music through the addition of movement. Repeating and overlapping sounds expands this visual language into word/sound pieces.

I create my video marks by selecting short portions of recorded video material and extensively cropping them to form narrow cells that contain only a small portion of the colors, textures and movement of the recorded landscape.

Marks in painting and drawing are traces from the artist's hand carrying the energy and expressiveness of the movement. Marks in my video work are similar as they record what is seen through a collaboration of my body movements with the movements inherent in the camera, the pan and the zoom.

In 1999 Alexander-Clarke had her first video exhibition, S-T-R-E-T-C-H-I-N-G, at El Camino College and the California Museum of Photography. The work was based on a family's experience with Huntington's disease. In 2001, she received an Individual Artist Grant from the City of Pasadena Cultural Affairs Division and the Pasadena Arts Commission for her choral video installation, 6 in 1 to 64 CHOIR. This work was exhibited at the Armory Center for the Arts in Pasadena, California.

Since then, Alexander-Clarke has exhibited her video work extensively at places including the California Museum of Photography, the Riverside Art Museum, and the Orange County Museum of Art. She has experimented with making increasingly abstracted works, completing what she called her first "video symphony", BUSCANDO, in 2017.

In 2018, she was awarded as a Fellow in Film-Video from the John Simon Guggenheim Memorial Foundation.

=== Light and Space ===
More recently, Alexander-Clarke has begun to distance herself from the label of "video artist." Certain critics, such as Peter Frank, argue that she should be considered more in line with the Light and Space movement. As he writes:

In fact, although she works entirely with video media, Alexander-Clarke is hardly a "digital artist" at all... Her sensibility is delicate, rhythmic, linear, situated in optical space and reliant on time, the fourth dimension, as a support rather than as a tool...Time happens to be a framework she has been able to unlock and leave open; and in this framework she composes abstract sequences that morph, however subtly or dramatically, as we stand before them.

...Whether or not any of her installational works incorporate the television monitors we associate with video art, Alexander-Clarke's approach does not depend on, address, or even acknowledge the physical condition of the monitor. Rather, she thinks in terms of walls and rooms – the video image as mural or even in space, not on video screen.

=== Notable exhibitions ===
- MIRANDO, California Museum of Photography, Riverside, CA, 2023.
- LLAMANDO, Lancaster Museum of Art and History, Lancaster, CA, 2023
- OJOS PROFUNDOS, Orange County Museum of Art, Santa Ana, CA, 2020
- TAPESTRIES, video installation, Armory Center for the Arts, Pasadena, CA, 2008
- UT COELUM, Robert V. Fullerton Art Museum, California State University, San Bernardino, San Bernardino, CA, 2003
- S-T-R-E-T-C-H-I-N-G, California Museum of Photography, Riverside, CA, 1999
- The Quest for Balance, group show; Woman's Building, Los Angeles, CA, 1987
