= Ioan Axente Sever =

Romanian theologian

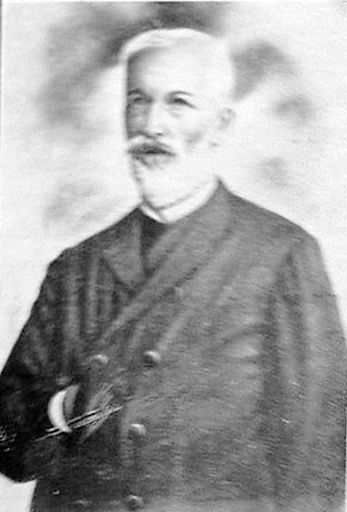

Member of the National Assembly of Hungary
- In office 13 December 1872 – 4 May 1877

Personal details
- Born: Ioan Axente; 15 April 1821 Frâua, Principality of Transylvania, Austrian Empire
- Died: 13 August 1906 (aged 85) Brașov, Austria-Hungary
- Resting place: Church of the Holy Archangels, Blaj, Alba County, Romania
- Party: Romanian National Party
- Occupation: Teacher
- Known for: Transylvanian Revolution of 1848
- Awards: Order of Leopold; Order of Franz Joseph; Order of Saint Anna

Ioan Axente Sever (born Ioan Axente; 15 April 1821 – 13 August 1906) was a Romanian revolutionary in Austria-Hungary who participated in the Transylvanian Revolution of 1848.

== Biography ==
=== Early years ===
He was born in Frâua (called Axente Sever since 1931), the son of Iacob Baciu and Ana, née Maxim. From 1831 to 1835 he studied in Blaj. He then returned to pursue his studies at the Gheorghe Lazăr Gymnasium in Sibiu, after which he returned in 1840 to Blaj to study theology and philosophy, having Simion Bărnuțiu as professor. He later went to Bucharest, where he was a teacher of Latin and Romanian language at a private school and at the Saint Sava College.

=== The Revolutions of 1848 ===
When the Wallachian Revolution broke out in 1848, he served as propaganda officer for the revolutionaries in Ilfov County, and then was sent to Dolj County to restore the state's authority.

After the defeat of the Wallachian Revolution, he returned to Transylvania in September 1848, where he participated in the border guards' assembly at Orlat, and then in the third Blaj National Assembly. Named prefect of the Blaj district, he became commander of Legion I Blasensis, which he turned into the strongest military unit in the army of Avram Iancu. From October 1848 to August 1849, with the objective of disarming Hungarian units, he saw action at Uioara, Ciumbrud, Sâncrai, Cricău, Aiud, Turda, Cluj, Cetatea de Baltă, Ocna Sibiului, the Apuseni Mountains, Alba Iulia and elsewhere. The campaign ended with the Surrender at Világos.

He was the commander of the troops that killed 15–20% of the Hungarian population of Aiud in January 1849, while another 15–20% froze to death while fleeing. Arrested for this massacre in late 1849, he stood trial at Sibiu, Bistrița, and Cluj. Together with other commanders (chiefly, Iancu and Simion Balint), he wrote reports on these events (published in German in newspapers from Vienna in 1850–1853), in which he argued that the Romanians in Transylvania were loyal to the Habsburg Emperor, and that they fought with Hungarian troops because the government in Budapest did not recognize the rights of the Romanians as a nation.

=== Later years ===
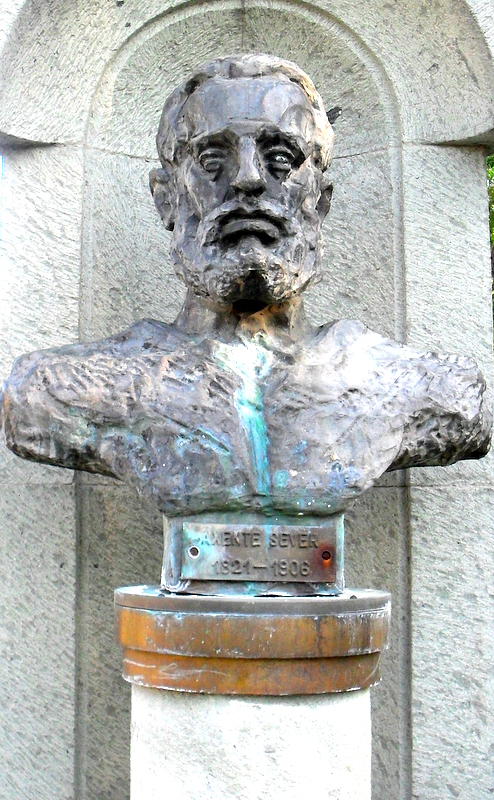
Bust of Axente Sever in Baia Mare

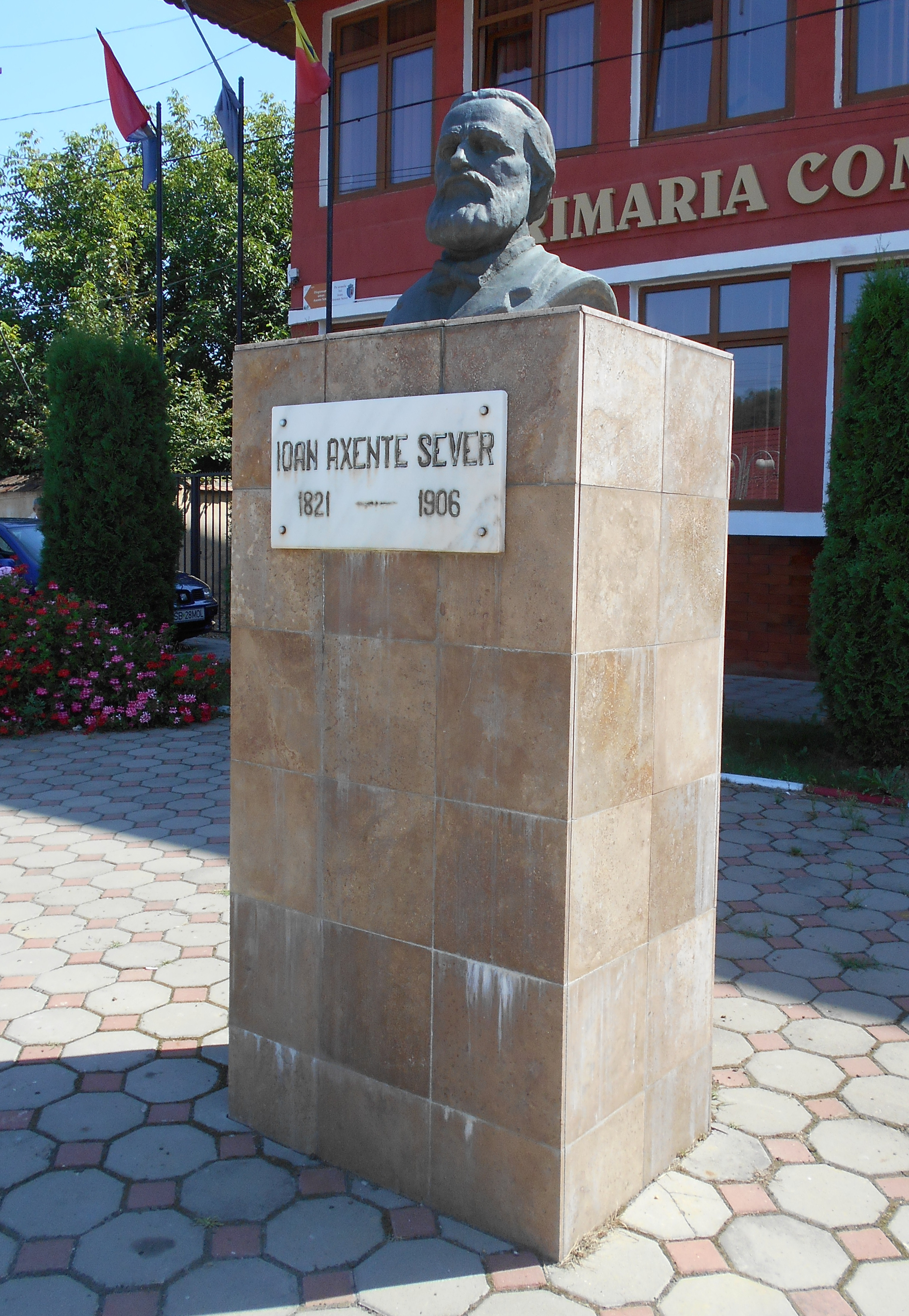
Bust in front of the townhall of Axente Sever commune in Sibiu County

In 1850 he was a tenant farmer at Cenade; in 1851, he was named court secretary at Alba Iulia. In July 1852, he met with Emperor Franz Joseph I of Austria at Mount Găina, and accompanied him to Sibiu. With this occasion, he was awarded the Order of Leopold (Golden Cross with Crown) and the Order of Franz Joseph, 3rd class. He also received the Imperial Russian Order of Saint Anna, 3rd class.

Between 1875 and 1877, Axente served in the lower house of the Hungarian Diet. Starting in 1881, Axente Sever was part of the ASTRA leadership in Sibiu. He moved to Brașov in 1892. His health began to decline in late 1900, and he was hospitalized in 1904. He died two years later, and was taken by train to Blaj, where he was buried in the cemetery next to the Church of the Holy Archangels.

== Legacy ==
There are streets named after him in Aiud, Cluj-Napoca, Mediaș, Satu Mare, Sibiu, Sighișoara, and Turda, as well as a plaza in Timișoara. A high school in Mediaș also bears his name.
