= David Maxim =

American visual artist

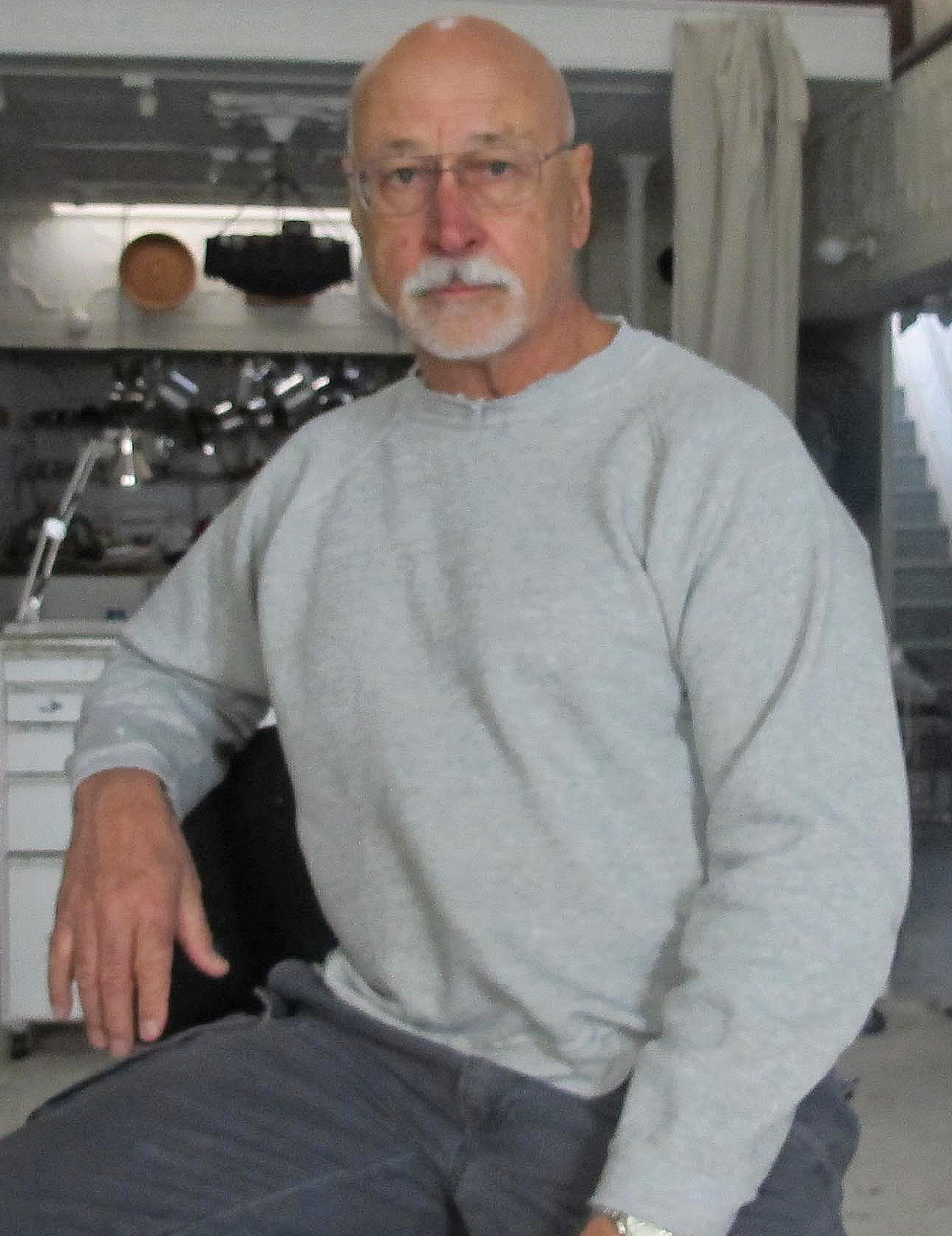
- Born: May 11, 1945; Los Angeles, CA
- Education: M.A., Art History, University of California Los Angeles, 1968 B.A., Art History, University of California Los Angeles, 1966
- Occupation: Visual artist
- Years active: 1971–present
- Website: davidmaximstudio.com

David Maxim (born 1945) is an American visual artist known for mixed media abstract compositions as well as figurative work in sculpture, painting and drawing. He lives and works in San Francisco.

== Education and background ==
David Maxim was born in 1945 in Los Angeles, California. After completing a master's in art history at the University of California Los Angeles in 1968, he taught art history for the studio artist at California State University, Los Angeles for a year before taking a one year hiatus in South America and Mexico. He subsequently moved to Santa Barbara, and then to San Francisco in 1976 to pursue his art, while continuing to teach art history for the studio artist at the San Francisco Art Institute and California State University Hayward. Soon, however, he was devoting himself full-time to his studio art. He received an artist residency at the Dorland Mountain Colony in the 1980s, and a Ludwig Vogelstein Foundation Grant in the 1990s. His work is found in private collections, museums and universities and in the U.S. and Europe.

== Work ==
Maxim's early work included realist oil paintings of the Himalayan mountains. In the later 1970s he created wood and fabric constructions that resembled sailing boats. These constructions were featured in the New Images/Bay Area exhibition at the Oakland Museum, Maxim's first significant museum exposure. In the 1980's Maxim began creating painting constructions using, what some referred to as his trademark, of painting and building on the back side of the canvas. Kenneth Baker of the San Francisco Chronicle wrote "What sets his objects apart from other paintings – in addition to their being turned to the wall – is the fact that he appears to hurl paint onto his monochromed surfaces with makeshift tools such as the rakes covered with paint soaked rags that hang from [the piece]." Maxim often worked on a monumental scale. Jolene Thym of the Oakland Tribune describes works in a 1994 exhibition at the UC Berkeley Museums at Blackhawk: "Layer upon layer of color drips down the 10-by-15-foot canvases, coating hunks of netting, dangling ropes, wheels and 12-foot-long clubs made of wood and burlap."

Baker writes, "Maxim’s big paintings have frequently incorporated near-life-size swaddled mannequins, ambiguously deployed like giant marionettes to evoke everything from eroticism and rescue to violence and mourning." Baker and others describe Maxim's painting as "explosive" and "visceral", with "strong homoerotic content."

Maxim creates smaller works using similar techniques, including the "face-to-wall" arrangement, layers of dripping paint and three-dimensional elements using other media. In the late 1990s and 2000s Maxim started creating works in series, including images of tornadoes and stars. He also produces works on paper, e.g. drawings and watercolors. Maxim's work combines elements of abstract expressionism with narrative themes, including mythology, mortality and nature.

=== Exhibitions ===
Maxim participated in several group exhibitions, including the Oakland Museum, the Carnegie Museum of Art, Richmond Art Center, the Baxter Art Gallery and California Palace of the Legion of Honor.

==== Solo exhibitions ====
Maxim has had various solo exhibitions.

- 29,028 Ft, Anapamu Gallery, Santa Barbara, California (1975)
- University Art Gallery, California State University, Stanislaus, Turlock, California (1985)
- The Labors of Hercules, The Artist’s Studio, San Francisco, California (1986)
- Force and Powers, The Artists Studio, San Francisco, California (1987)
- Forum, Hamburg Kunstmesse, Hamburg, Germany (1988)
- Galerie Sander, Darmstadt Germany (1991)
- Thomas Gehrke Gallery, Hamburg, Germany (1993)
- Kunstverein, Heidenheim, Germany (1993)
- Painted Philosophy, UC Berkeley Museums at Blackhawk, Danville, California; traveling: Cabrillo Gallery, Cabrillo College, Santa Cruz, California; Sheldon Gallery, University of Nebraska, Lincoln, Nebraska (1994)
- Men, Space 743, San Francisco, California (1995)
- Heroes and Giants, Space 743, San Francisco, California (1996)
- Minor Figures, Space 743, San Francisco, California (2001)
- Unseen Pictures, Graystone Gallery, San Francisco, California (2002)
- Small Scale Figure Sculpture, Graystone Gallery, San Francisco, California (2004)
- Natural Force, Polk Museum of Art, Lakeland, Florida (2005)
- Drawings: Tornadoes and Waves, Contemporary Gallery, Southeastern Louisiana University, Hammon, Louisiana (2007)
- The Light of Change, David Cunningham Projects, San Francisco, California (2008)
- Delicate Knots, California Bank of Commerce, Lafayette, California (2009)
- Selected Drawings, George Lawson Gallery, San Francisco, California (2010)
- Legends of the Bay Area, Marin Museum of Contemporary Art, Hamilton Field, Novato, California (2012) https://marinmoca.org/exhibitions/2012/
- The Collection, Polk Museum of Art, Lakeland, Florida (2012)
- Figure Drawings, Flint Institute of Arts, Flint, Michigan (2013)
- Points of View, Saint Mary’s College Art Museum, Moraga, California (2016)
- David Maxim at Windows 226, San Francisco, CA (ongoing 2017- )
- Abstraction and Other Matters, 2121 Artspace, San Francisco, California (2023)
- Paintings, Drawings, Sculpture, California Bank of Commerce, Lafayette, California (2020-2024)

=== Selected collections ===
Maxim's work is held in numerous museum collections.

- Achenbach Foundation for Graphic Arts, Fine Arts Museum of San Francisco, California
- The British Museum, London
- Brooklyn Museum of Art, New York
- Bullard, E. John, New Orleans Museum of Art, New Orleans, Louisiana
- Carnegie Museum of Art, Pittsburgh, Pennsylvania
- Cedar Rapids Museum of Art, Cedar Rapids, Iowa
- Crocker Art Museum, Sacramento, California
- Faulconer Gallery, Grinnell College, Grinnell, Iowa
- Figge Art Museum, Davenport, Iowa
- Flint Institute of Arts, Flint, Michigan
- Graduate Theological Union, Berkeley, California
- Graphische Sammlung Albertina, Vienna, Austria
- Hammer Museum, Grunwald Center, University of California, Los Angeles
- Herbert F. Johnson Museum of Art, Cornell University, Ithaca, New York
- Long Beach Museum of Art, Long Beach, California
- Mills College Art Museum, Oakland, California
- Milwaukee Art Museum, Milwaukee, Wisconsin
- Montgomery Museum of Fine Arts, Montgomery, Alabama
- Museum of Fine Arts, Houston, Texas
- Museum Für Moderne Kunst, Frankfurt, Germany
- Museum of Art and History, McPherson Center, Santa Cruz, California
- Museum of Contemporary Art, Tucson, Arizona
- San Francisco Museum of Modern Art, San Francisco, California
- National Baseball Hall of Fame & Museum, Cooperstown, New York
- Nelson-Atkins Museum of Art, Kansas City, Missouri
- Oakland Museum of California, Oakland, California
- Polk Museum, Lakeland, Florida
- San Antonio Museum of Art, San Antonio, Texas
- San Jose Museum of Art, San Jose, California
- Smith College Museum of Art, Northampton, Massachusetts
- Spencer Museum of Art, University of Kansas, Lawrence, Kansas
- University Art Museum, California State University, Long Beach, California
- University Art Museum, University of California, Santa Barbara, California
- University of California Museum at Blackhawk, Danville, California
- University of Virginia Art Museum, Charlottesville, Virginia
