= Ferenc Csentery =

Hungarian abstract metal sculptor

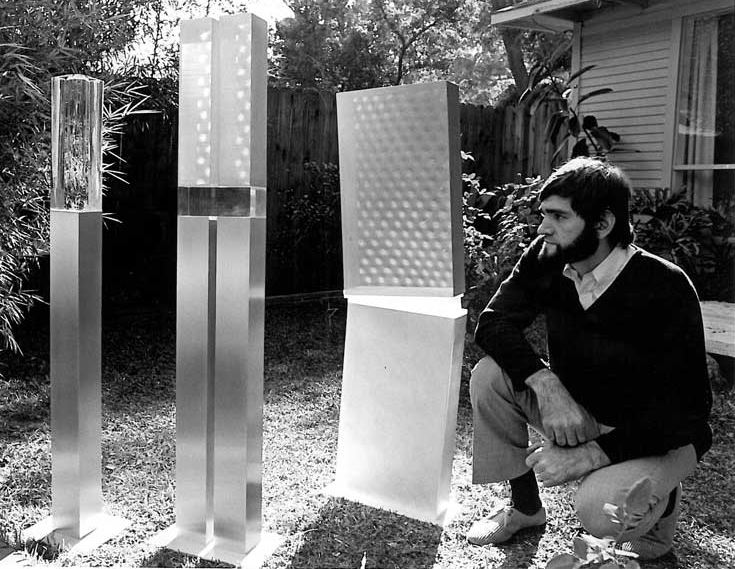
- Csentery, c. 1970
- Born: Ferenc Csentery; December 29, 1937; Blaj, Romania
- Died: November 7, 2014 (aged 76); Idyllwild, California
- Education: School of Technology (Győr, Hungary), University of Judaism, Fine Arts (Los Angeles, California)
- Known for: Sculptor
- Movement: Abstract

Ferenc Csentery (December 29, 1937 – November 7, 2014) was an abstract metal sculptor known for his conceptual work related to the emergence of the US Space Program in the 1960s. He was particularly known for the high degree of technical precision of the machining and welding in his sculpture.

== Early life ==
Csentery was born in 1937 into an ethnic Hungarian family, the son of a carpenter in Blaj, Romania (Hungarian: Balázsfalva). When he was young, his family relocated to Győr, Hungary, where he was raised and later educated as an engineer. He fled the country during the Hungarian Revolution of 1956 by riding a bicycle across the Austrian border, and he made his way to Los Angeles, California as a refugee. He was drafted into the United States Army in 1961 and was stationed at USAGD Braconne, near Angoulême, France, where he began sculpting with materials such as stone and wood while working in a base machine shop. After returning to the United States, he worked as a machinist and Heliarc welder, and he began using space-age materials, such as aluminum and Lucite, in his sculptures.

== Early career ==
During the 1960s and 1970s, Csentery produced a body of work in which he used distinct form, along with industrial materials like aluminum and stainless steel, to express his concept of space research and development. Throughout this period, he showed his work prolifically in the Los Angeles metropolitan area, but as his popularity and recognition began to increase, he retreated from public showing of his work to focus solely on developing his art. He also taught sculpture at California Institute of Technology during the 1969–1970 academic year.

Csentery's exhibitions were attended by notable members of the Los Angeles art scene, as well as Hollywood writers, producers, and directors. The design of the TIE fighter in the Star Wars franchise closely resembles a Csentery sculpture which pre-dates the movie by several years, suggesting that Ferenc's view of technology was in-line with other futurist visionaries of his era. His sculptures were also featured in the opening scene of the television show Night Gallery hosted by Rod Serling.

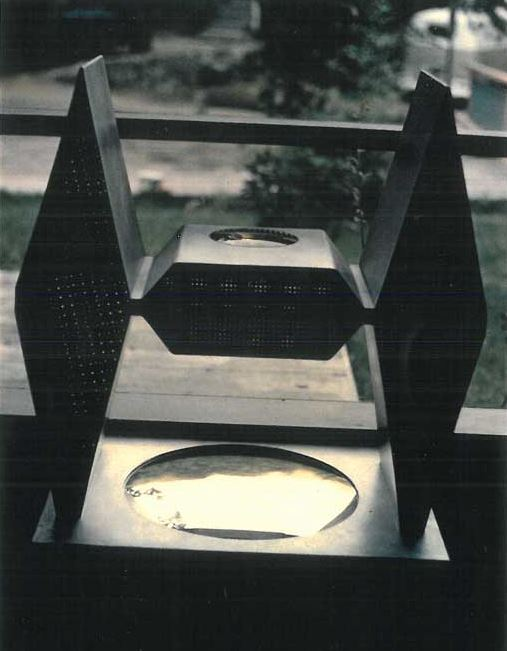
Sculpture by Ferenc Csentery from 1967 which was exhibited in the Los Angeles/Hollywood area in the late 1960s.

== Late 1970s to Present ==
Csentery continued to articulate his artistic vision of space and technology through the 1970s and 1980s, while working as an independent precision welder for aerospace companies including Jet Propulsion Laboratory (JPL), working on projects such as the Voyager program. He opened a gallery in Pasadena, California in the late 1980s, where he hosted private exhibitions of his work. During the 1990s, he expanded his focus to include functional art with a series of commissioned pieces including lights and fountains for clients in West Los Angeles.

Health issues forced him to retire from welding and serious metalwork in 2001, and he moved to Idyllwild, California in 2004, where he continued creating art using alternative materials, including a series of kinetic sculptures he called "spinners" or "Idyllwilds", constructed from perforated metal and thin sheets of PVC plastic. Ferenc also continued to catalog and preserve Hungarian folk songs, including many original melodies written for the poems of Sándor Petőfi. He died at his home in Idyllwild on November 7, 2014.

== Critical reception ==
Los Angeles Times art critic and author Henry J. Seldis referred to Csentery as "one of the most intriguing young sculptural talents on the local scene", later referring to his work as "uncommonly interesting" and stating that "he achieves a simple elegance based on rather complex schemes."

In a review of the 1967 Long Beach Museum of Art 5th Annual Southern California show, noted Los Angeles art critic and printmaker Arthur Millier highlighted Csentery's work as "impressive", calling him one of "the four best talents in [a] rewarding show".

Dr. David Smith, founder of Caltech's Baxter Art Gallery, wrote that his sculpture is "a superbly intellectual art which engages the viewer's imagination" and stated that "his early training and continuing, often highly original and imaginative experience with metals are amongst the sources of an art which is so precise as to be breathtaking."

== Collections and Public Works ==
- Two of Csentery's Sculptures are in the permanent collection of the Hirshhorn Museum and Sculpture Garden, Infinity (1967) and Third Stage (1966).
- His sculpture "Quaternity" was purchased for the collection of the California State University, Los Angeles, in 1976
- Ferenc designed and made the star polyhedron for the roof of the Hungarian Reformed Church in Ontario, California, which is the highest point in the surrounding area and is a well-known, visible landmark.

== Exhibitions ==
- "Five Americans" (1963) – Museum of Fine Arts, Bordeaux, France
- "Annual Southern California Exhibit" (1966) – Long Beach Museum of Art, Long Beach, California
- "First Annual Small Images Exhibit" (1966) – CSULA, Los Angeles, California
- "Newcomers '67 Exhibition" (1967) – Lytton Center of the Visual Arts, Los Angeles, California
- "Second Annual Small Images Exhibit" (1967) – CSULA, Los Angeles, California
- "First One-Man Show" (1967) – Comara Gallery, Los Angeles, California
- "Cerritos Open" (1968) – Cerritos College, Cerritos, California
- "Annual Southern California Exhibit" (1968) – Long Beach Art Museum, Long Beach, California
- "Second One-Man Show" (1968) – Comara Gallery, Los Angeles, California
- "53rd National Orange Show" (1968) – San Bernardino, California
- "Annual All-California Exhibition" (1968) – Laguna Beach Art Museum, Laguna Beach, California
- "Two-Man Show" (1969) – Ventura State College, Ventura, California
- "6th National Annual Exhibition" (1969) – Washington State University, Bellingham, Washington
- "Southern California Art Expo" (1969) – Del Mar, California
- "Annual All-City Exhibit" (1969) – Laguna Beach Art Museum, Laguna Beach, California
- "45th Annual Exhibition – Pasadena Society of Artists" (1969) – Pasadena Art Museum, Pasadena, California
- "Two-Man Show" (1970) – California Institute of Technology, Pasadena, California
- "One-Man Show" (1970) – Comara Gallery, Los Angeles, California
- "Eighth Annual Southern California Exhibition" (1970) – Long Beach Museum of Art, Long Beach, California
- "Group Exhibition" (1970) – Occidental College, Los Angeles, California
- "Two-Man Show" (1970) – Palos Verdes Art Museum, Palos Verdes, California
- "All-City Art Festival" (1972) – Los Angeles, California
- "Two-Man Show" (1974) – Brand Art Center, Glendale, California
- "Tenth Annual Small Images Exhibit" (1976) – CSULA, Los Angeles, California
- "All-City Art Festival" (1978) – Los Angeles, California
- "Private Exhibition" (1988) – Pasadena, California
- "Los Angeles Artwalk" (2001) – Los Angeles, California
