= Ioan Simu =

Romanian priest, politician (1875–1948)

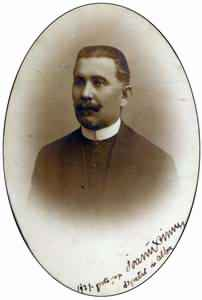
Ioan Simu

Ioan Simu (June 27, 1875–June 22, 1948) was an Austro-Hungarian-born Romanian Greek-Catholic priest and politician.

== Biography ==
=== Origins, early activity and World War I ===
Born in the village of Ciufud, in Alsó-Fehér County, part of the Transylvania region in Austria-Hungary (now Alba County, Romania), Simu studied in the nearby town of Blaj. He married Eugenia Ciura, the daughter of a Greek-Catholic priest from Abrud, and was himself ordained to the priesthood in 1898. The couple had six daughters and a son. While still a student, Simu was charged with agitation against the Hungarian state after singing the Romanian patriotic song “Deșteaptă-te, române!” as part of a choir. He was fined and spent four months imprisoned at Szeged.

Simu began his activity as a priest in 1900, at Abrud. Under constant surveillance by the authorities, in 1909 he was dismissed by government order for his nationalist stance. Assigned as parish priest at Luna de Arieș in 1912, he was promoted to archpriest at Sebeș the following year, by order of Metropolitan Victor Mihaly de Apșa. He was involved in Romanian cultural organizations, founding a craftsmen's society in Abrud and pressing the Sebeș authorities to grant subsidies to ASTRA, in which he remained active through the 1920s.

When Romania entered World War I in August 1916, the Hungarian authorities launched a wide-scale campaign of repression against nationalist Romanian leaders throughout Transylvania. Simu, together with other community leaders in Sebeș, was arrested at night. Not only was he an intransigent activist, but his son had crossed the Southern Carpathians and joined the Romanian Army. Initially taken to Sibiu, the arrestees were joined by a larger group, all of whom were sent to the detention camp at Sopron. Simu was held there until March 1917, when he returned to Sebeș.

=== Entering politics in Greater Romania ===
In early November 1918, as Austria-Hungary neared defeat in the war, Simu defied the government and held an assembly in the main square of Sebeș. He subsequently became president of the city's Romanian National Council (CNR). Simu was a delegate to the Great National Assembly at Alba Iulia, which proclaimed the union of Transylvania with Romania on December 1. He subsequently resigned as CNR head, reversed his decision and then resigned for good, in favor of the local Romanian Orthodox archpriest. Evidence suggests Simu was pushed aside due to his religion, although according to his account, he had always sought to avoid conflict with the Orthodox. At the same time, as the Romanian authorities consolidated their hold over Transylvania, Simu appeared on a list of reliable persons.

Active within the Romanian National Party (PNR), Simu was selected as its candidate for the Abrud seat in the Assembly of Deputies at the 1922 election. Although he had left the town a decade earlier, he retained influence among the local moți. His wife died during the campaign. His opponent was Ioan Rusu-Abrudeanu of the National Liberal Party (PNL); although native to the area, he vehemently criticized the “provincialism” and (implicitly Greek-Catholic) “confessionalism” of Transylvania's Romanians in the press, constantly attacking the PNR. At the time, the PNL controlled the area's prefecture, police and gendarmerie, helping ensure Rusu-Abrudeanu's victory through electoral fraud. Ample free stew and brandy distributed by PNL agents were not enough to sway the vote to Rusu-Abrudeanu; it needed the Abrud election administrator to invoke bureaucratic reasons for invalidating the votes from Zlatna and Feneș and turn Simu's 270-vote victory into a 152-vote defeat.

For a time, the cheated Simu focused on the church, obtaining some 16 hectares for its use as a result of the 1923 land reform. His repeated requests for funds from the city hall were at last repaid, the money being used for a new roof, repairs to the parish house and a cemetery fence. Despite a war reparation paid in 1926, the sum was not enough to purchase new bells; the old ones had been requisitioned during the armed conflict. He came in contact with a Romanian Greek-Catholic priest from Aurora, Illinois, asking him to hold a fundraiser for new bells. The latter demurred, claiming his bishop would not allow it. In the event, new bells arrived only in 1947, after Simu's retirement.

=== Switching parties ===
Beginning in 1925, Simu waded back into politics, harshly criticizing a PNR proposal to ally with the national minorities, in particular the Magyar Party, ahead of the 1926 election. He claimed that the Hungarian minority displayed a hostile attitude towards the Romanian state, and admitted that he could not forget various indignities he had suffered under Hungarian rule. As a result, certain leaders of the Alba County PNR harassed Simu and attacked his faith. This provoked the prickly priest to quit the PNR and join Alexandru Averescu’s People's Party (PP). Running on its lists, he was successful this time in his bid for election as a deputy. However, he did not feel at home in the PP, which he left in November 1927. He subsequently entered the Nicolae Iorga-led Democratic Nationalist Party, finding there some old PNR cadres who had joined in 1925.

Simu served as acting mayor of Sebeș in 1930-1931. By this time, his public image was in decline, with a hundred parishioners from Sebeș penning a letter to Metropolitan Vasile Suciu, complaining that he focused on political power to the detriment of church matters. Already during his time as deputy, his frequent trips to parliament and ministries in distant Bucharest angered the faithful, even though he helped secure funds for the church and its school. In 1931, former PNR comrades, by now in the National Peasants' Party (PNȚ), published bitter articles against Simu, accusing him of greed for his involvement in a land dispute. The priest replied via open letter, but a fresh salvo ended in a quatrain calling him “Father Million”.

Nevertheless, Simu joined the PNȚ, running as its candidate at the 1933 election. The following year, he was elected to its Alba County executive. From that point, he was exclusively involved in party work, no longer seeking office. In November 1934, at Cut, he led a group of priests in celebrating the liturgy, following which he delivered a speech; the occasion was the unveiling of a bust of Septimiu Albini, which 10,000 attended. In 1935-1936, he was vice president of the Alba County PNȚ, attending rallies and lavishing praise on party president Iuliu Maniu. Turning 60 in 1935, he had become a loyal activist, no longer clashing with the leadership.

=== Communist onset and death ===
In August 1946, with the Romanian Communist Party consolidating power, the PNȚ Alba chapter, representing the main faction still backing Maniu, met at a bank in Alba Iulia. Their purpose was to nominate candidates for the November election. Following a pattern of communist activists disrupting Peasantist gatherings, some 40 people broke into the bank and started beating those present. Simu, while trying to leave the room, was brutally beaten with a chair and an electric lamp.

Shortly thereafter, Simu retired from the priesthood. Most likely, the beating left him unable to carry out his duties. He departed Sebeș and moved in with one of his daughters at Alba Iulia, where he died two years later, just short of age 73. Simu was buried in the Maieri cemetery. Thus, he did not live to see the new communist regime outlaw his church several months later, nor the widespread campaign of persecution it launched against its clerics, and against non-communist politicians.
