= Church of the Holy Archangels, Blaj =

Heritage site in Alba County, Romania

Coordinates: 46°10′19″N 23°55′23″E

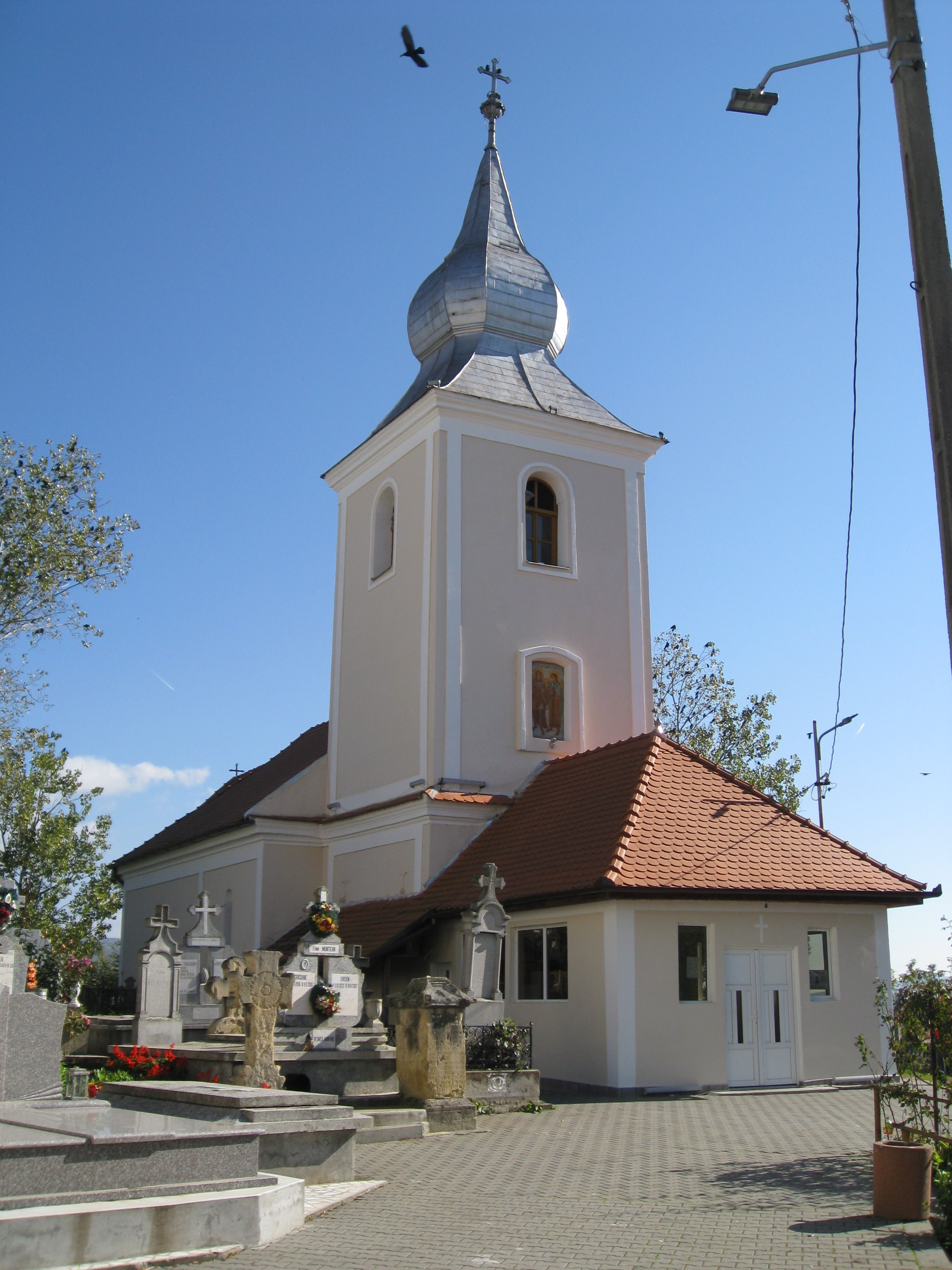
Church of the Holy Archangels

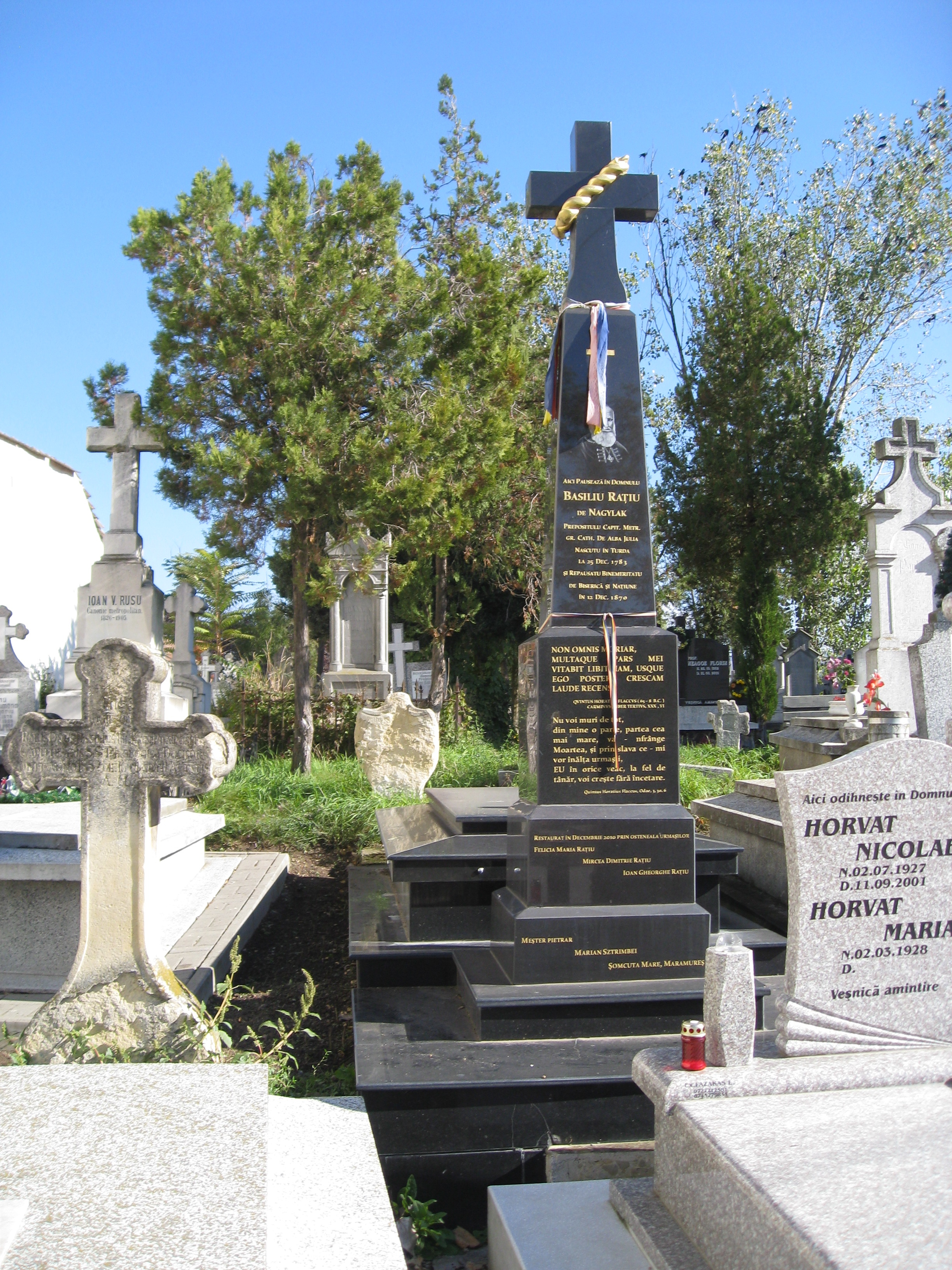
Church cemetery

The Church of the Holy Archangels (Romanian: Biserica Sfinților Arhangheli), also known as the Greeks' Church (Biserica grecilor), is a Romanian Orthodox church located at 3 Mitropolit Ioan Vancea Street in the Transylvanian city of Blaj. Until 1948 the church was Romanian Greek-Catholic.

The church is situated close to the bridge that crosses the Târnava Mare River. Built around 1770, it stands on the site of a previous wooden church. Construction was undertaken by local residents, who included Aromanian merchants erroneously described as "Greeks", giving rise to the nickname. The iconostasis, artistically sculpted in 1776, was later painted in Brâncovenesc style, as the initial art was destroyed.

This ensemble was praised by Nicolae Iorga. Additionally, it was linked by a 1969 article with Ștefan of Ocnele Mari, a painter hired in 1737 by Inocențiu Micu-Klein, head of the Romanian Greek-Catholic Church, headquartered in Blaj. As the Holy Trinity Cathedral was not even in the planning stages at that point and the old Greek church was the only Romanian church in Blaj at the time, the author concluded that Ștefan had painted the iconostasis. However, a 1977 article claimed that the style was far from belonging to a Wallachian painter of the first half of the 18th century, and that all the icons were painted in 1776.

The church cemetery includes the graves of a number of cultural and religious figures, most of whom were Greek-Catholic. These include Timotei Cipariu, Ioan Axente Sever, Alexandru Sterca-Șuluțiu, Ioan Micu Moldovan, Ioan Rusu, Ionel Pop, Ștefan Manciulea, and Basiliu Rațiu. Both the church and the cemetery are listed as historic monuments by Romania's Ministry of Culture.
