= Sonia Colceru =

Romanian volleyball player

Personal information
- Nationality: Romanian
- Born: 1 January 1934 (age 91); Blaj, Romania

Sport
- Sport: Volleyball

Sonia Colceru (born 1 January 1934) is a Romanian volleyball player. She competed in the women's tournament at the 1964 Summer Olympics.
