= Maieri Churches =

Heritage site in Alba County, Romania

Coordinates: 46°03′43″N 23°34′50″E

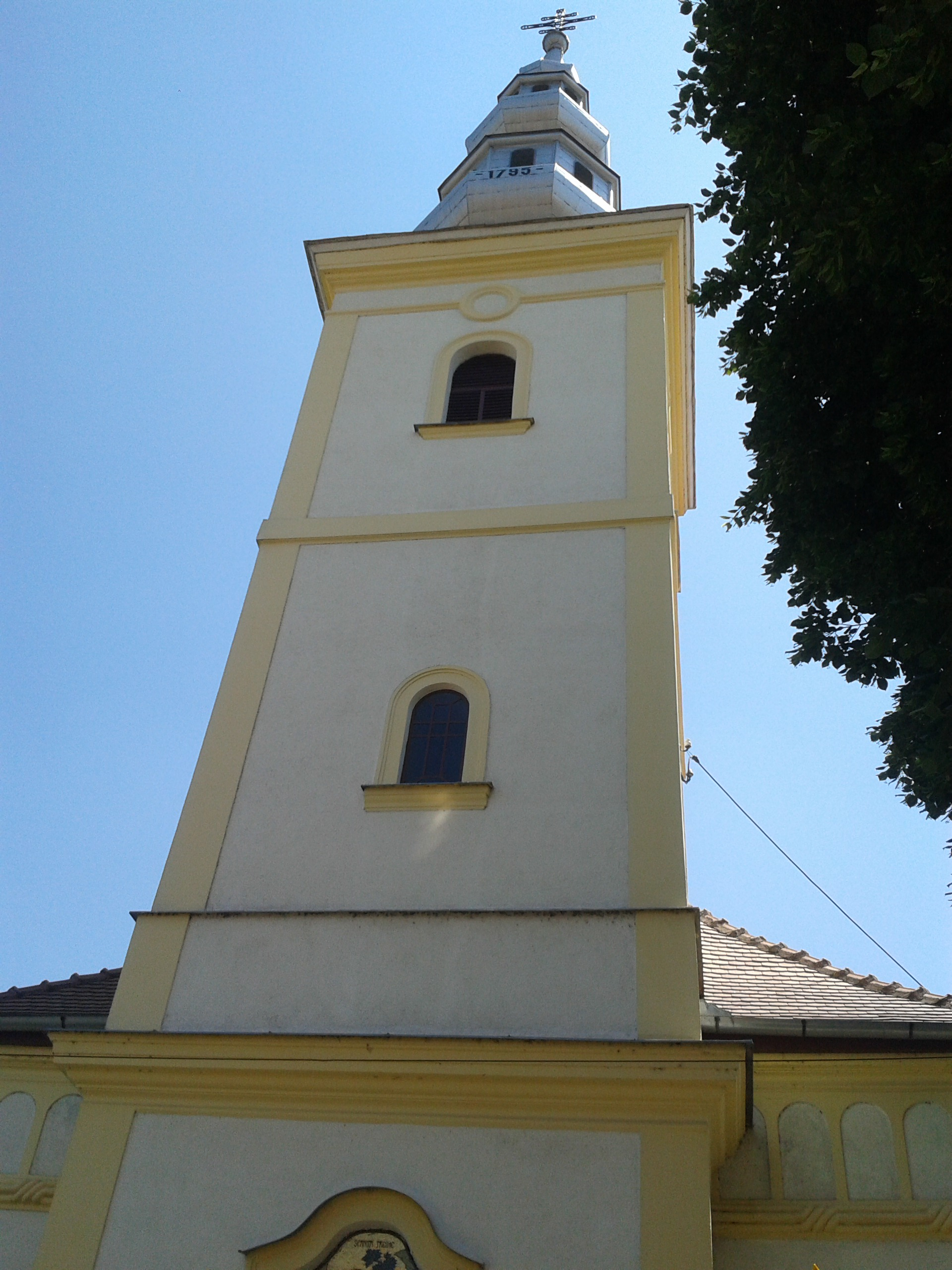
Maieri I Church in Alba Iulia.jpg

The Maieri Churches are a pair of Romanian Orthodox churches located on Iașilor Street, Alba Iulia, Romania. Each is dedicated to the Holy Trinity.

== Maieri I ==
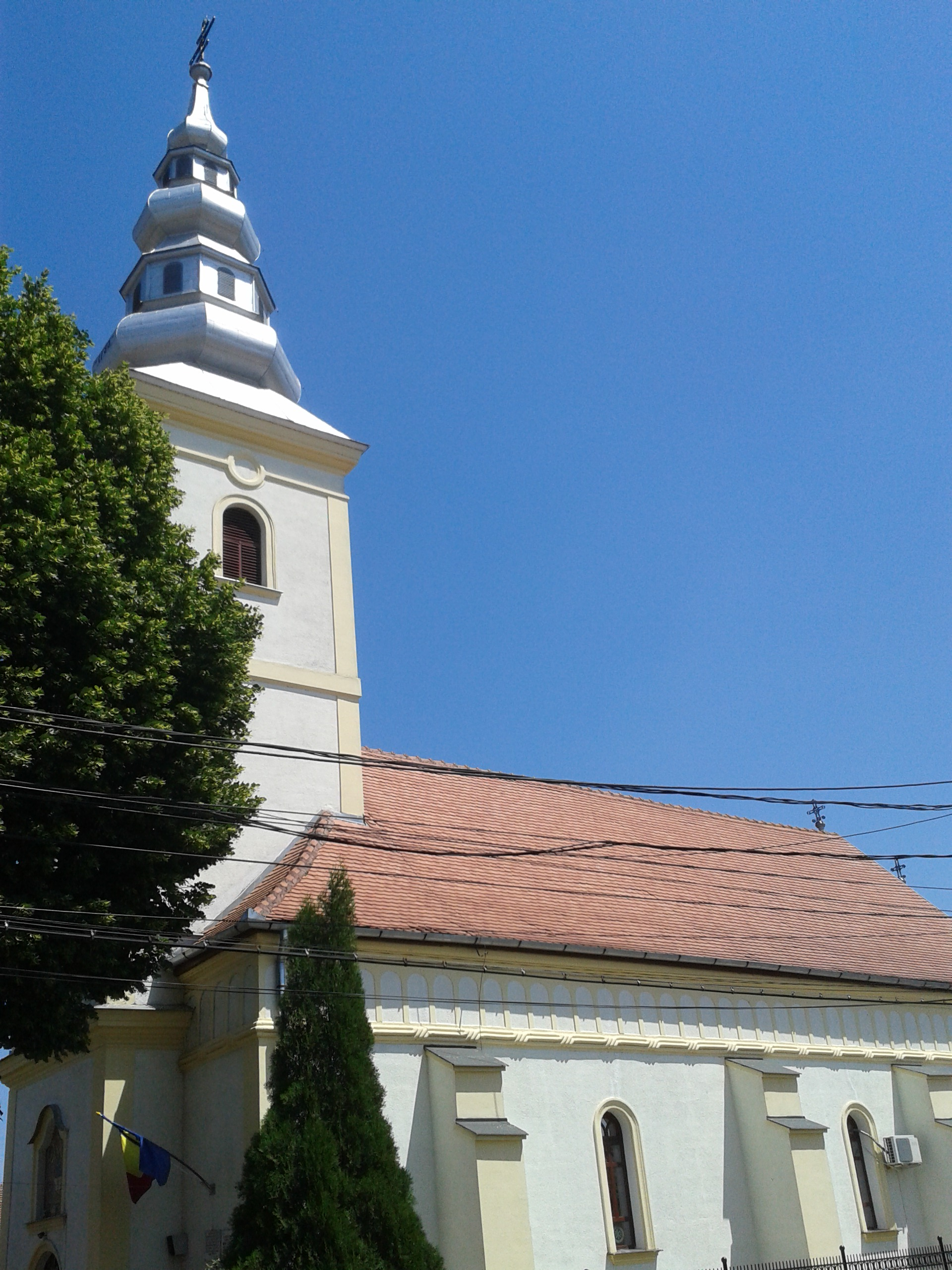
Maieri I Church

Maieri I Church, located at #43, was built in 1795 on the site of an earlier wooden church. It is a hall church with a detached polygonal apse facing east. The westerly bell tower was added in the early 19th century. A mosaic above the door shows the Trinity.

Contributions from the community paid for the church. It is associated with the leaders of the Revolt of Horea, Cloșca and Crișan, whose confessor served there, gave them their final eucharist and took down their last will. Mihai Eminescu visited in 1866. An Orthodox service was held inside on the morning of December 1, 1918, prior to the Great National Assembly of Alba Iulia.

The interior was painted in 1925-1926, and again in 1992. Several plaques commemorate historical figures associated with the area. Unlike other churches in the city, the church has always been Orthodox. It is listed as a historic monument by Romania's Ministry of Culture and Religious Affairs.

== Maieri II ==
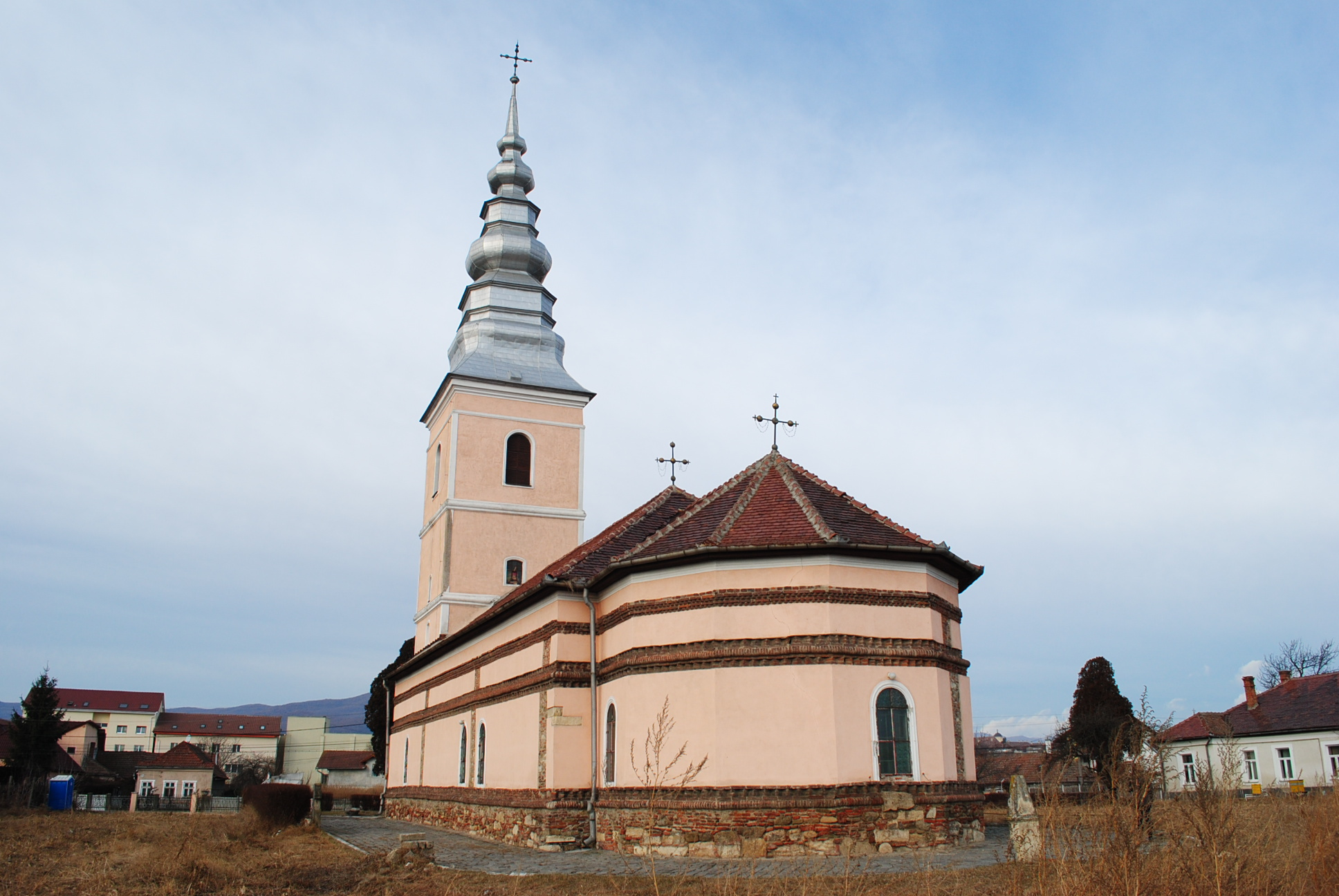
Maieri II Church

Maieri II Church was quickly built between 1713 and 1715, as residents were being moved from the vicinity of the new Alba Carolina Citadel. At the time, the area was on the edge of the city. Part of the materials come from the old Metropolitan Cathedral, demolished to make way for the fort. Massive limestone blocks visible in the walls presumably came from the Roman Castra of Apulum.

The Austrian authorities paid 1300 florins in compensation, which were wasted by the church administrator. Initially, the church was small and dark, with only a nave and altar. In the 1730s, the nave was widened westward and a vestibule added to the hall church. The westerly bell tower dates to the time of Bishop Petru Pavel Aron. Done in Baroque style, it is taller than the church is long, entered through a built-in staircase. The detached apse is semicircular on the interior, polygonal on the exterior. The last expansion took place in the mid-20th century.

The original iconostasis was done in 1716-1717 by a Wallachian artist in the Brâncovenesc style, while the muralist was from Abrud. These no longer survive, and both the current iconostasis and the wall paintings are from 1961. The only fragment of the old painting is on the western side of the vestibule, and shows the Second Council of Nicaea. The most valuable architectural elements are on the exterior, where the brick arrangement in sawtooth pattern shows a clear Wallachian influence. At the base of the tower, there is a noblewoman’s gravestone from 1622, probably taken from the metropolitan cathedral cemetery. The same source supplied a bell, cast in the princely workshop in 1620. The stone baptismal font has an inscription mentioning a man who died in 1786.

The city’s first primary school with instruction in Romanian was founded in 1760 and run by the church. Bishop Iuliu Hossu celebrated a Te Deum inside on December 1, 1918, before presiding at the Assembly. Atanasie Anghel, the first Romanian Greek-Catholic bishop, was buried in the churchyard until 2013. The church was Greek-Catholic until 1948, when the new communist regime outlawed the organization.
