= Blaj =

- Municipality
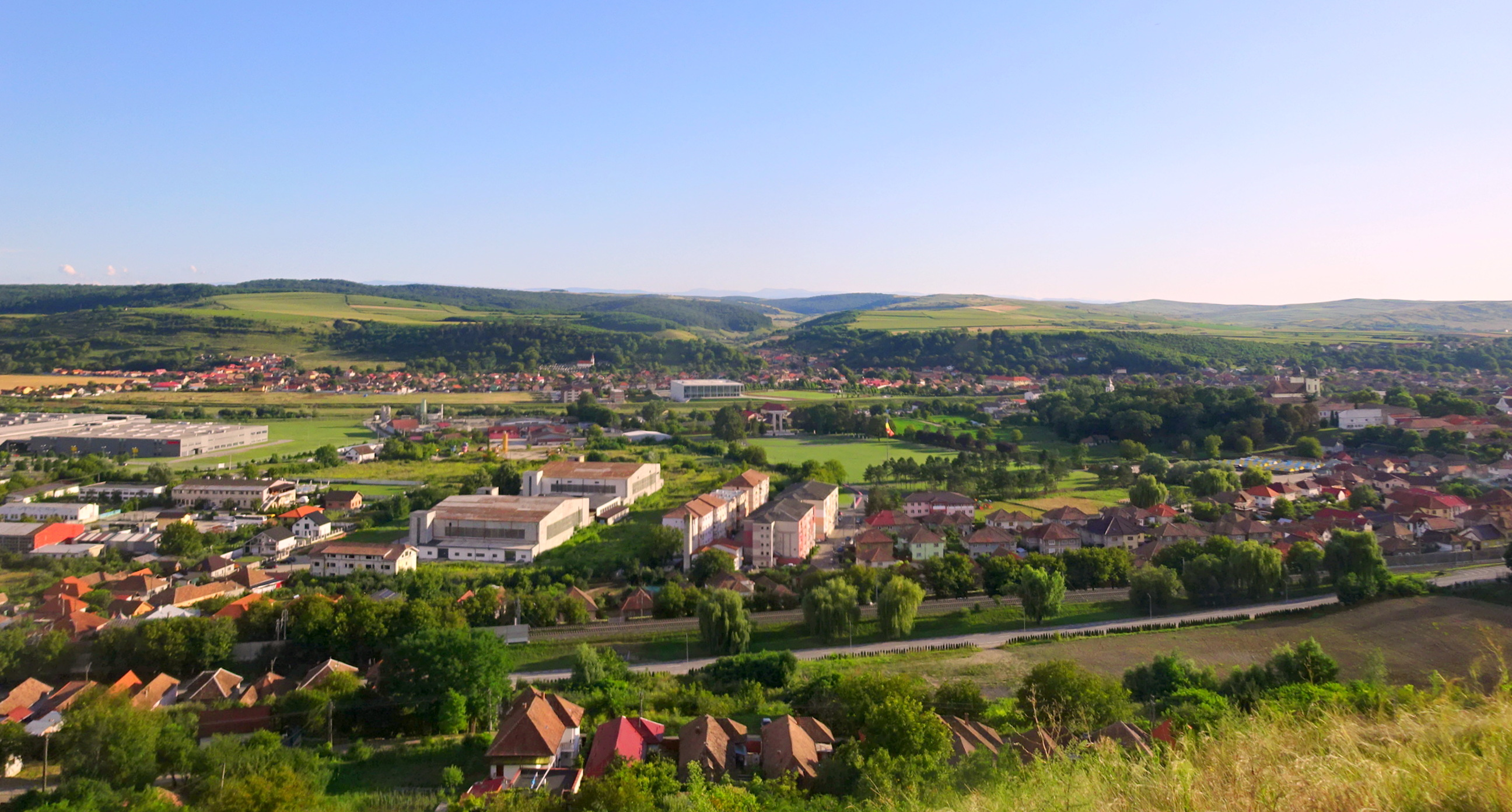
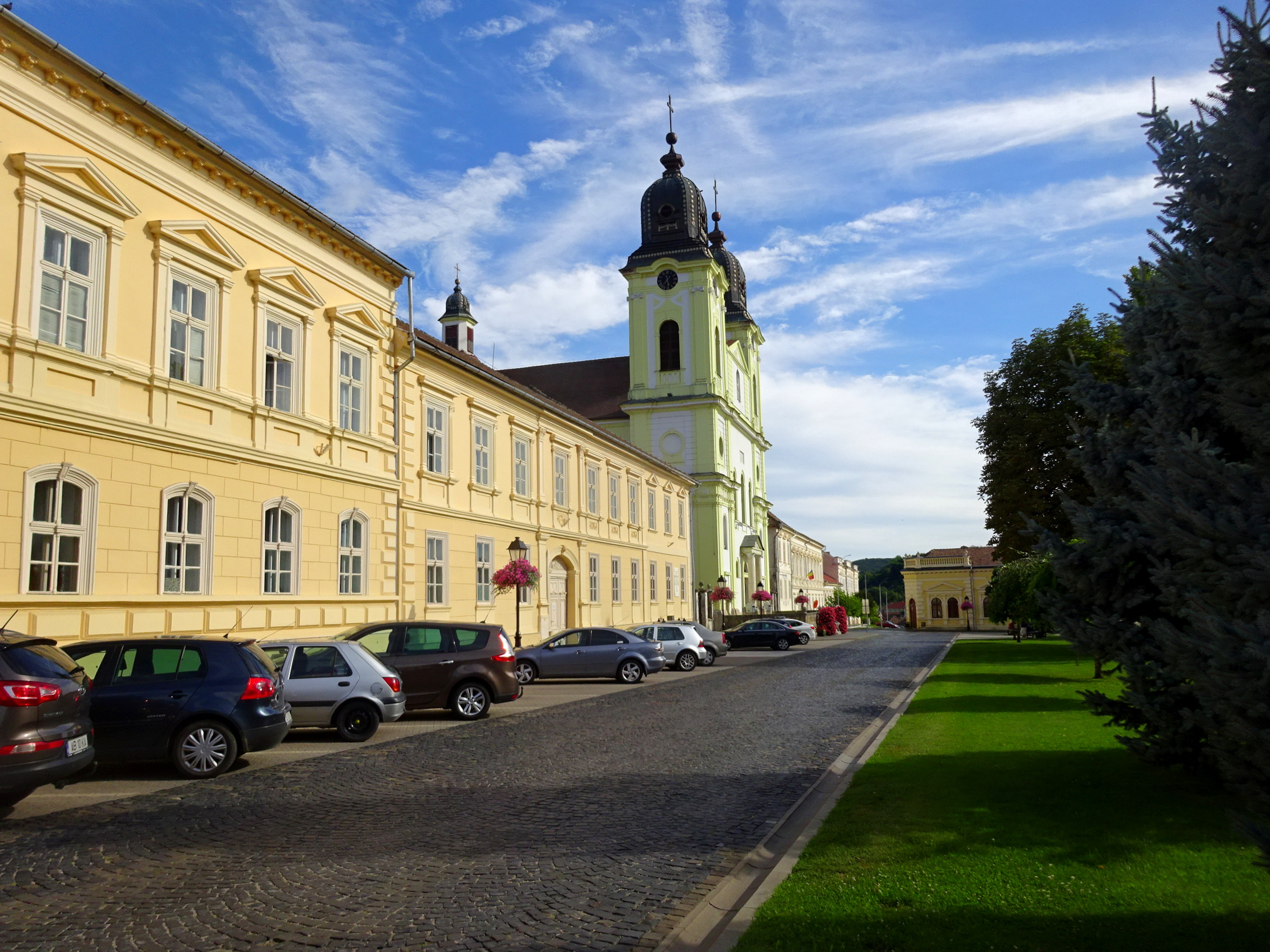
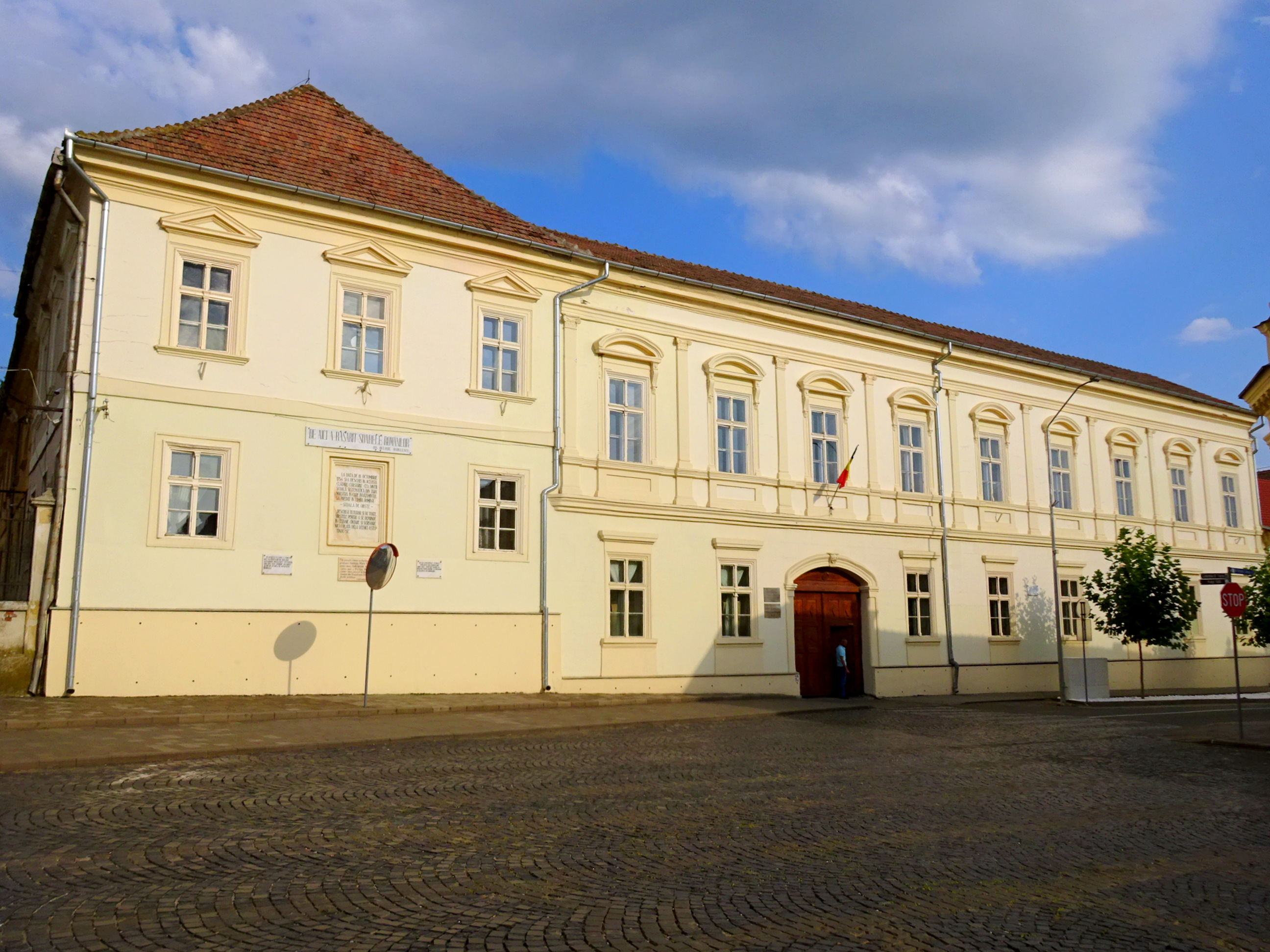
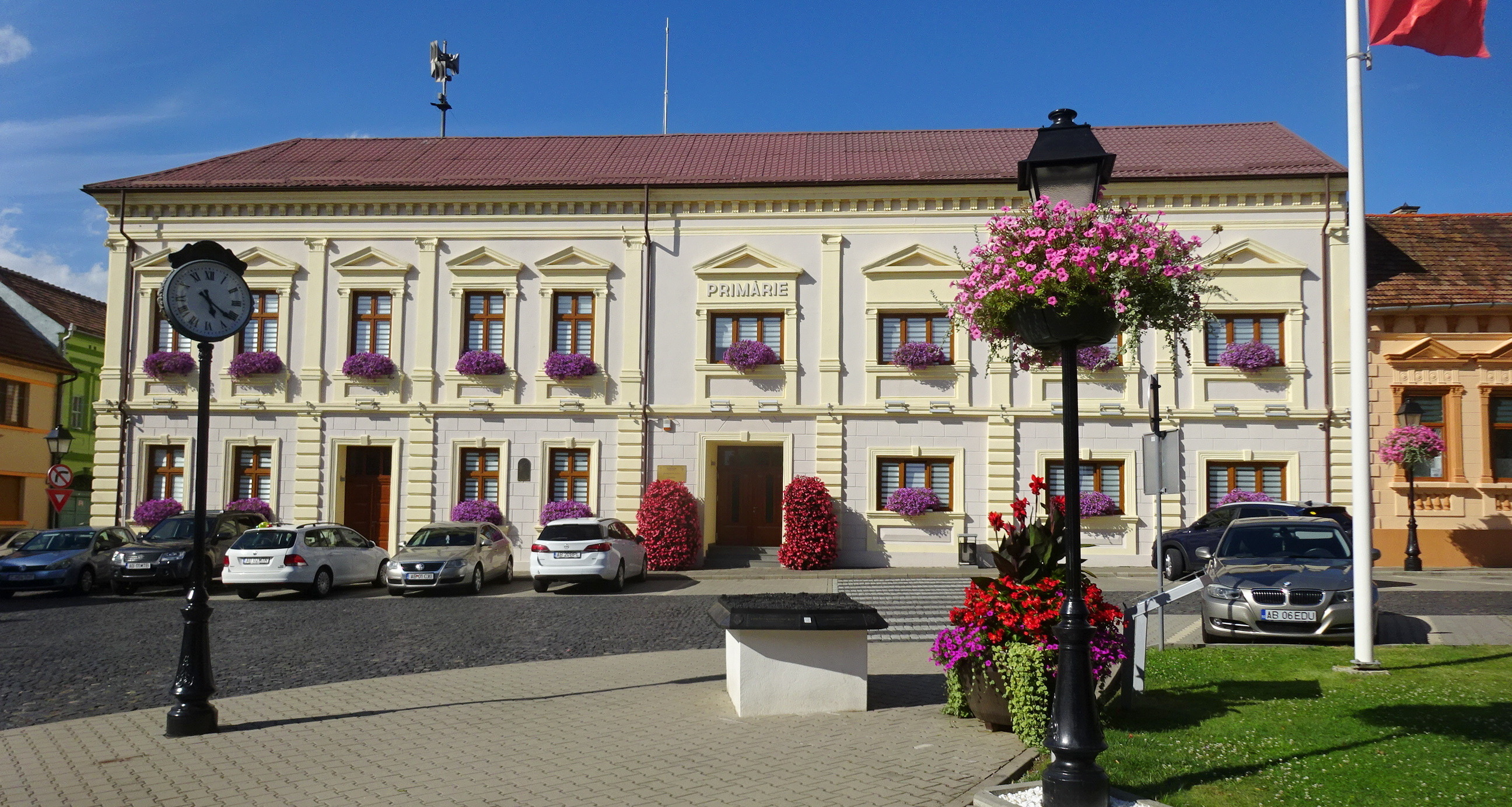
- View of Blaj from Viilor Hill Cathedral of the Holy Trinity Greek Catholic School Blaj Town Hall building

- Coat of arms

- Location in Alba County

- Location in Romania
- Coordinates: 46°10′31″N 23°54′52″E
- Country: Romania
- County: Alba

Government
  - Mayor (2024–2028): Gheorghe Valentin Rotar (PNL)
- Area: 98.93 km^{2} (38.20 sq mi)
- Elevation: 260 m (850 ft)
- Population (2021-12-01): 17,816
  - Density: 180.1/km^{2} (466.4/sq mi)
- Time zone: UTC+02:00 (EET)
  - Summer (DST): UTC+03:00 (EEST)
- Postal code: 515400
- Area code: (+40) 02 58
- Vehicle reg.: AB
- Website: www.primariablaj.ro

Blaj (Romanian pronunciation: [blaʒ]; archaically spelled as Blaș; Hungarian: Balázsfalva; German: Blasendorf; Transylvanian Saxon: Blußendref) is a city in Alba County, Transylvania, Romania. It has a population of 17,816 inhabitants as of 2021.

The city administers eight villages: Deleni-Obârșie (Obursatanya), Flitești, Izvoarele (until 1960 Ciufud; Csufud), Mănărade (Monora), Petrisat (Magyarpéterfalva), Spătac (Szászpatak), Tiur (Tűr), and Veza (Véza).

The city was the principal religious and cultural center of the Romanian Greek-Catholic Church in Transylvania.

== History ==
Blaj is first mentioned in 1271 as Villa Herbordi, after the deed of a Count Herbod. In 1313, the domain passed to Herbod's son Blasius Cserei and the town was mentioned as Blasii. Starting as a hamlet for the twenty families of servants of the noble's court, it was awarded town status on May 19, 1737.

The first public school in Romanian was established in Blaj in 1754. Blaj was the first place to have Romanian written with Latin alphabet instead of Cyrillic in which it had traditionally been written. Blaj was also a center for the Romanian Age of Enlightenment, being the founding site of the Transylvanian School that promoted the Roman cultural heritage of the Romanians. Thus Blaj gained the nickname "The Little Rome", as Romania's national poet Mihai Eminescu called it.

In 1848, Câmpia Libertății in Blaj was where over 40,000 Romanians met to protest Transylvania becoming a part of Hungary, holding that the lands would be stolen from them.

== Geography ==
Blaj lies at the confluence of the Târnava Mare and Târnava Mică rivers, where they form the Târnava River. It is located 39 km (24 mi) northeast of the county seat, Alba Iulia, in a renowned wine-growing region.

== Villages ==
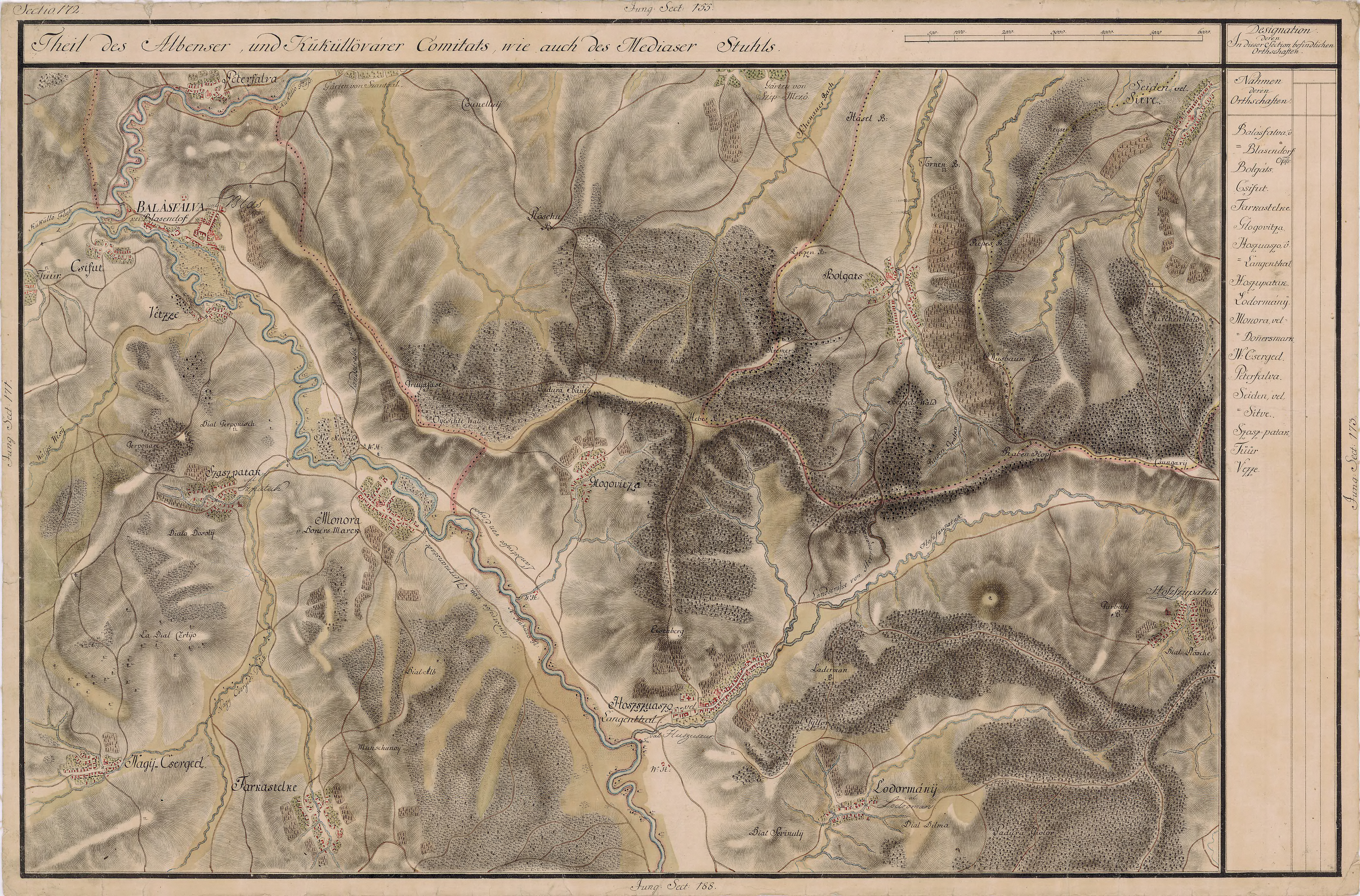
Blaj and its surroundings on the Josephine Land Survey (1769–1773)

=== Mănărade ===
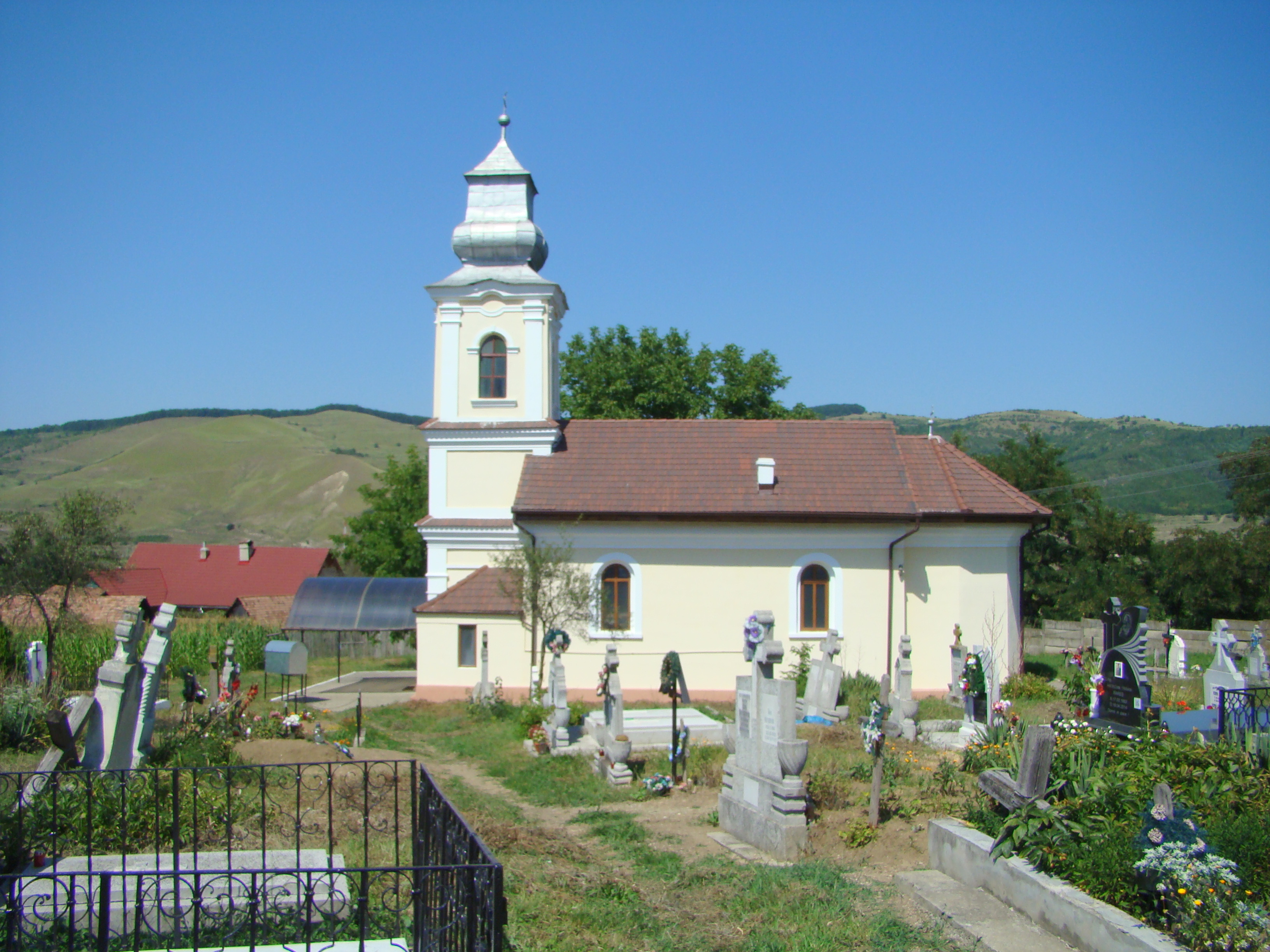
Romanian Orthodox Transfiguration Church in Mănărade

Mănărade village (German: Donnersmarkt; Hungarian: Monor, during the Middle Ages, belonged to the Cistercian Igriș Abbey, a status attested from 1315-1320.

In the early 21st century, the crumbling Evangelical fortified church was restored at a cost of nearly €100,000; the largest sum came from donations given by former residents who had emigrated to Germany.

Nearly 60% of villagers were German Transylvanian Saxons in 1910, as opposed to 39% Romanians. By 2002, the German community was down to four individuals, Romanians stood at 91% and Roma 8.4%. The village had 814 residents in 2021.

== Demographics ==
Historical population
Year	Pop.	±%
1930	4,618	—
1948	6,641	+43.8%
1956	8,731	+31.5%
1966	15,775	+80.7%
1977	20,826	+32.0%
1992	22,425	+7.7%
2002	21,819	−2.7%
2011	20,630	−5.4%
2021	17,816	−13.6%
Source: Census data

At the 2021 census, Blaj had a population of 17,816. At the 2011 census, the city had a population of 20,630, of which 16,779 (83.78%) were Romanians, 1,305 (6.51%) Hungarians, 1,850 (9.23%) Romani, and 45 (0.22%) Germans.

In terms of religious affiliation, 14,784 (71.19%) were Romanian Orthodox, 2,732 (13.24%) Greek-Catholic, 744 (3.58%) Roman Catholic, 985 Reformed Church, 408 Baptist, and 220 Pentecostal.

== Education ==
The city has several high schools, including the Inochentie Micu Clain National College, the Ștefan Manciulea Technological High School, and the Sfântul Vasile cel Mare Greek-Catholic Theological High School.

== Attractions ==
The castle of the Bethlen dynasty is a popular tourist site near Blaj. Other sights worth visiting include the Metropolitan Palace, the Holy Trinity Cathedral, the "Buna Vestire" Monastery, the Greeks' Church, the "Liberty Field", and Avram Iancu's oak.

=== Twin towns — Sister cities ===
Blaj is twinned with:

- (Switzerland) Allschwil
- (Belgium) Morlanwelz
- (Italy) Recanati

== Natives ==
- Tiberiu Bărbulețiu (born 1963), politician
- Silviu Bindea (1912–1992), footballer
- Matei Boilă (1926–2015), politician, Greek-Catholic priest
- Bogdan Cistean (born 1986), footballer
- Sonia Colceru (born 1934), volleyball player
- Ferenc Csentery (1937–2014), abstract metal sculptor
- Doina Ivănescu (1935–1996), volleyball player
- Bogdan Jica (born 2000), footballer
- Nicolae Linca (1929–2008), welterweight boxer
- Daniel Lupașcu (born 1981), footballer
- Andreas Schmidt (politician) (1912-1948) (from Mănărade)
- Ioan Simu (1875–1948), Greek-Catholic priest and politician
- Ioan Suciu (1907–1953), bishop of the Greek-Catholic Church
- Daniel Tătar (born 1987), footballer
- Samuil Vulcan (1758–1839), bishop of the Greek-Catholic Church

== Climate ==
Blaj has a humid continental climate (Cfb in the Köppen climate classification). The city has a continental temperate climate, characteristic for the Transylvanian Plateau, with moderate precipitations of around 550 mm/m^{2}.

Climate data for Blaj
Month	Jan	Feb	Mar	Apr	May	Jun	Jul	Aug	Sep	Oct	Nov	Dec	Year
Mean daily maximum °C (°F)	2.3 (36.1)	5.1 (41.2)	10.3 (50.5)	16.2 (61.2)	20.8 (69.4)	24.1 (75.4)	26.1 (79.0)	26.3 (79.3)	21.1 (70.0)	15.5 (59.9)	9.6 (49.3)	3.5 (38.3)	15.1 (59.1)
Daily mean °C (°F)	−1.6 (29.1)	0.6 (33.1)	5 (41)	10.8 (51.4)	15.7 (60.3)	19.3 (66.7)	21.2 (70.2)	21.3 (70.3)	16.2 (61.2)	10.5 (50.9)	5.1 (41.2)	−0.1 (31.8)	10.3 (50.6)
Mean daily minimum °C (°F)	−5 (23)	−3.3 (26.1)	0 (32)	5 (41)	10.1 (50.2)	14 (57)	15.9 (60.6)	16.1 (61.0)	11.5 (52.7)	6.1 (43.0)	1.6 (34.9)	−3 (27)	5.7 (42.4)
Average precipitation mm (inches)	29 (1.1)	27 (1.1)	37 (1.5)	56 (2.2)	75 (3.0)	84 (3.3)	76 (3.0)	56 (2.2)	54 (2.1)	43 (1.7)	33 (1.3)	36 (1.4)	606 (23.9)
Source: https://en.climate-data.org/europe/romania/alba/blaj-44396/

== See also ==
- Bethlen Castle
- Câmpia Libertății
