= Armory Center for the Arts =

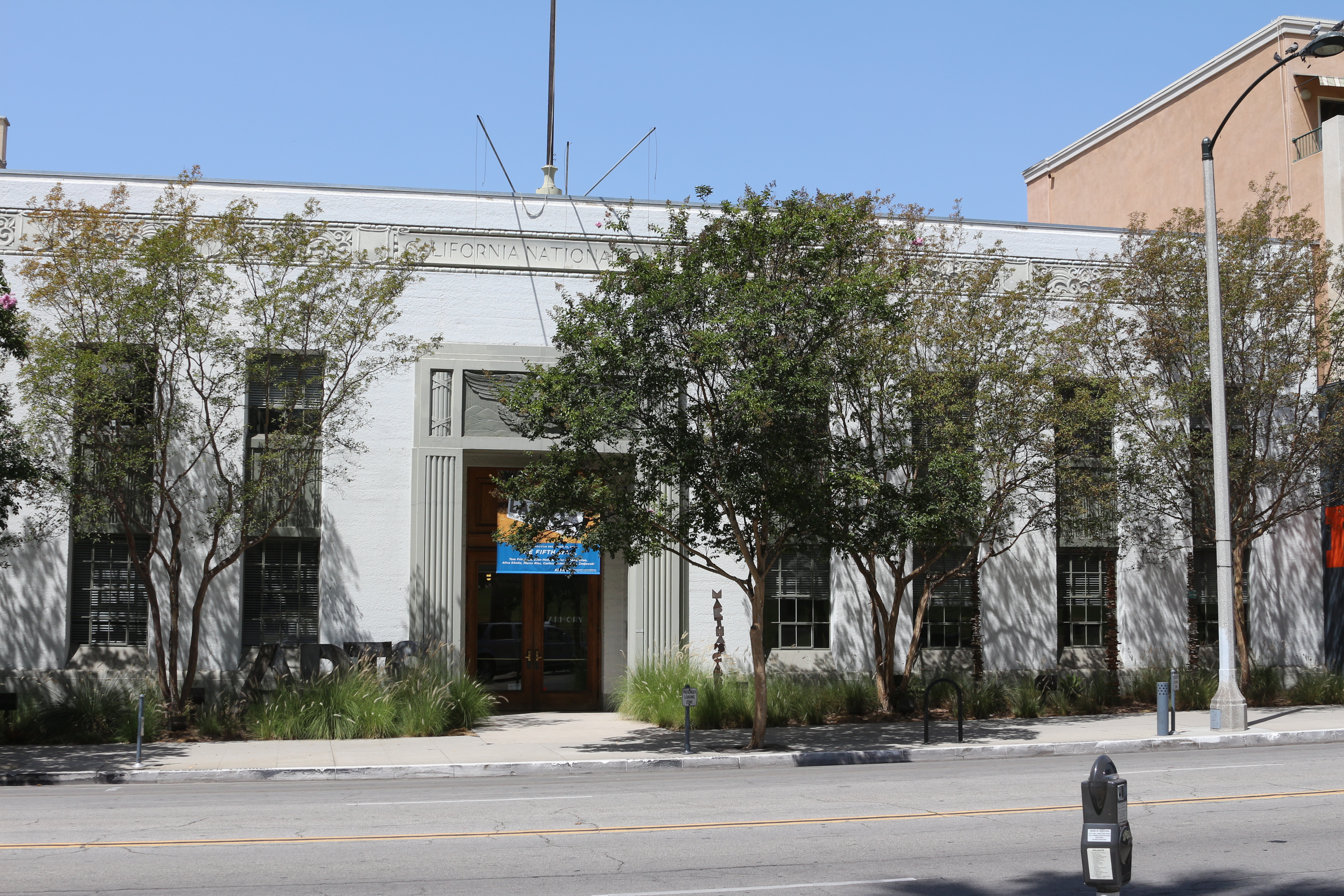
- Established: 1989
- Location: 145 North Raymond Avenue Pasadena, CA 91103
- Coordinates: 34.148338°N 118.149297°W
- Website: www.armoryarts.org

The Armory Center for the Arts is a non-profit community arts organization that offers arts education programs and contemporary art exhibitions in Pasadena, California, United States. It originated as the education department of the Pasadena Art Museum in 1947. After the museum closed in 1974 (and became the Norton Simon Museum), the education program became known as the Pasadena Art Workshops. The workshops in collaboration with the Baxter Art Gallery became the Armory Center for the Arts in 1989.

== In popular culture ==
- The center was the primary location for the 2005 movie, Marilyn Hotchkiss' Ballroom Dancing and Charm School.
