= Baxter Art Gallery =

Art exhibition space at the California Institute of Technology

Coordinates: 34.277513°N 119.268927°W

- Established: 1971
- Dissolved: 1985
- Location: Donald E. Baxter, M.D., Hall (Caltech Campus)
- Founder: David R. Smith

Baxter Art Gallery was an art exhibition space at the California Institute of Technology, founded by Professor of Literature David R. Smith in 1971, and David Smith became the first gallery director. The little gallery was nationally known for its daring exhibits of contemporary art. When it closed in 1985 for financial reasons, the Archives of American Art at the Smithsonian Institution requested all its records. The board of governors considered to relocate the gallery, then in 1989, it in collaboration with the Pasadena Arts Workshop became the Armory Center for the Arts.

In memory of the gallery, several original exhibition posters are hanging in Baxter Hall, Caltech.
