= Mihai Robu =

Romanian Catholic bishop (1884–1944)

- Bishop of Iași
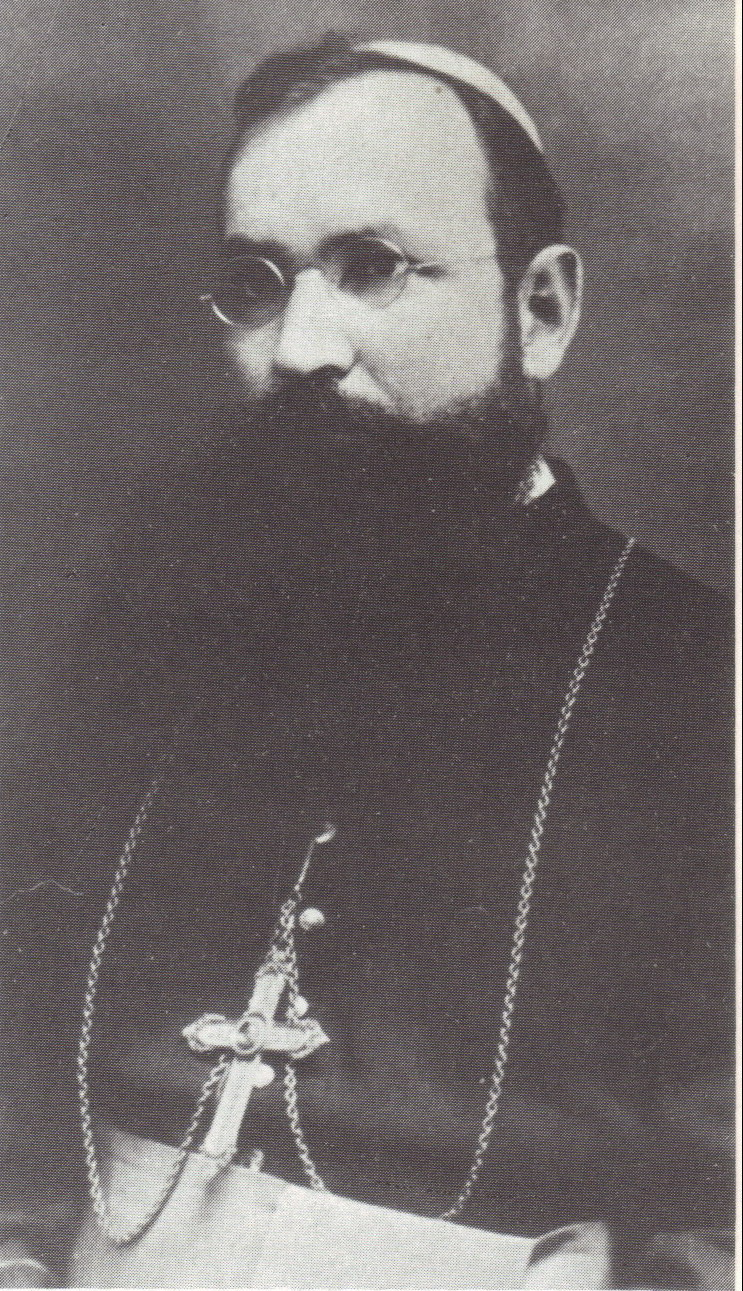
- Church: Catholic Church
- Diocese: Diocese of Iași
- In office: 5 July 1925 – 27 September 1944
- Predecessor: Alexandru Cisar
- Successor: Markus Glaser (as apostolic administrator); Anton Durcovici (from 1947)

Orders
- Ordination: 20 April 1907
- Consecration: 20 September 1925 by Alexandru Cisar

Personal details
- Born: 10 April 1884 Săbăoani, Roman County, Kingdom of Romania
- Died: 27 September 1944 (aged 60) Beiuș, Bihor County, Kingdom of Romania

Mihai Robu (also known as Mihail or Mihaiu Robu; Hungarian: Rab Mihály; 10 April 1884 – 27 September 1944) was a Romanian cleric, bishop of the Roman Catholic Diocese of Iași in 1925–1944. He was born to Hungarian-speaking Csángó parents in Western Moldavia, but, throughout his life, professed Romanian nationalism and encouraged assimilation. He trained for the priesthood in Iași, at the Roman Catholic Institute, then became noted as a propagandist of his church in the majority-Orthodox country. Robu founded the Catholic publishing enterprise Presa Bună, put out the magazine Lumina Creștinului, and, during World War I, served various Moldavian parishes. His career in interwar Greater Romania was helped along by his 1920 return to Iași, initially as secretary to Bishop Alexandru Cisar.

In 1925, once Cisar had been promoted Archbishop in Bucharest, Pope Pius XI unusually selected Robu as his replacement in Iași; he was preferred for his status as a native of the diocese, and is widely regarded as the first Iași Catholic bishop to count as a native (of either Romania or Western Moldavia). Monsignor Robu, whose jurisdiction extended into Bessarabia and Bukovina, had many projects which required financing, prompting him to seek sponsors abroad. He also had quarrels over this issue with the Romanian state, turning to political Catholicism and encouraging his eccesiastical subjects to vote as a single bloc in national elections. He agreed with Catholic anti-Nazism, and deplored the passage of racial laws by Nazi Germany, though he remained critical of Romanian Jews as a group.

World War II reshaped Robu's diocese, beginning with the Soviet takeover in Bessarabia and parts of Bukovina. In subsequent population transfers, Robu lost many German and Székely congregants. He had to step in and prevent his fellow Csángós from moving into Regency Hungary, while also managing to persuade the Romanian dictator, Ion Antonescu, not to deport all or most Catholics as a "foreign" population. After Operation Barbarossa in 1941, the diocese retook its lost parishes, and also expanded into Transnistria Governorate. While agreeing with Antonescu's nationalist agenda and supporting it with missionary priests, Robu also challenged the regime's involvement in the Holocaust, by protecting Jewish converts to Catholicism. The aging Monsignor lived to witness Antonescu's downfall in 1944, but died shortly after, from pneumonia, while seeking shelter in Beiuș.

== Biography ==
=== Early life and priesthood ===
Robu was born in Săbăoani, Roman County, on 10 April 1884, almost three years after the establishment of a Romanian Kingdom. He descended from the more affluent portion of the peasant class in Moldavia. Ioan "Ianuș" Robu, who was Mihai's grandfather, had been peasant deputy in the ad hoc Divan of the late 1850s. As a Catholic by birth, he was informed by his peers that he could not serve, since Divan membership was limited to adherents of the Eastern Orthodox Churches. Ioan protested, telling them that there could be no taxation without representation; following the establishment of the United Principalities, and revisions of the electoral law, this Robu served in the 1864 legislature.

Interwar newspapers describe Bishop Robu as an ethnic Romanian who spoke eloquently in "sweet Romanian". His father, known as Iosif or Iojă Robu, is described in such contexts as a "simple plowman". As reported by historian Mihály Laczkó, the Robus were actually of Hungarian origin, with both of Mihai's parents listed as Csángós. The same is argued by teacher and monographer Mihai Perca, who describes Robu as a fellow Csángó. Robu himself never denied that this was the case: in a 1932 interview for Erdélyi Lapok, he confessed that his mother tongue was Hungarian, which he still spoke. However, he also held the belief that the Csángós were Magyarized Romanians, stating that he took no issue if the community underwent voluntary Romanianization and language death. By contrast, during the interwar his brother and sister still used Hungarian names, introducing themselves as Rab András and Rab Maria. The bishop himself is occasionally known as "Rab Mihály".

Young Robu finished primary schooling in Săbăoani. Moving to Iași, he entered the Roman Catholic Institute in 1894, with a focus on philosophy and theology. He was ordained deacon in 1906 and priest on 23 April 1907. For several years, starting before his priestly ordination, Robu was in charge of the Iași seminarians. He was deeply involved in Catholic propaganda, helping to set up the Presa Bună publishing house, which put out his own prayer book and textbooks, and, in 1913, the religious magazine Lumina Creștinului (to which he contributed a long series of theological and historical articles).

Upon the start of World War I, Robu was confronted with a rise of anti-Catholic sentiment, and produced articles which aimed to demonstrate that his congregation was traditionally loyal and patriotic. During the subsequent defensive military campaigns of 1916–1918, when the seminary was closed, Robu was a parish priest at Văleni, Faraoani and Bacău. In 1920, he returned to teach when the seminary reopened, and was named secretary to Bishop Alexandru Cisar. In 1922, he was named parish priest at Horlești and chaplain at an Iași monastery. He contributed to the moralizing effort by translating Christoph von Schmid's "Wonderful Doctor" story, published by Presa Bună in early 1924. In February, Robu and his colleague Markus Glaser, who was supervising Catholic parishes in Bessarabia, were taken in as supernumerary privy chamberlains of the Papal Court.

=== Beginnings as Bishop ===
In early 1925, after having assigned Cisar to lead the Archdiocese of Bucharest, Pope Pius XI selected Robu as his Bishop in Iași. While formally underqualified, he was favored by the Holy See due to his great popularity and his local roots, immediately advancing ahead of the non-native clergy. He is thus widely seen as the first native (or more strictly Romanian) Catholic ever to occupy that seat, though Cisar himself is viewed as such by some authors. Robu went through the main formalities on 5 July 1925. The investiture ceremony was officiated by the outgoing Cisar on 20 September, at the Institute compound. Attendees included Robu's father, who was visibly moved, and who was the first person to be blessed by the Monsignor in his new robes.

The event was received with some astonishment by members of the majority Romanian Orthodox Church, since it had been attended by officials of the nominally distinct Greek Catholic Church. Such critics concluded that there was no longer any merit to the claim that Greek Catholics had separate agency. Throughout the remainder of his life and career, Robu encouraged close cooperation between the two sister institutions, and allowed some of the churches in his own diocese to use the Byzantine Rite. Orthodox–Catholic disputes were meanwhile enhanced by Robu's 1929 interview with Ana Jurgea-Negrilești, issued as a brochure at Presa Bună. Though referring to the Orthidox as "kindered siblings", he was rejected by them for demanding their communion with Rome, on the basis of "all-too-familiar sophistry".

Robu's activities in office included the building of numerous churches, special attention to the seminary and the opening of a new one at Luizi-Călugăra, support for the Catholic press, and many visits to parishes in the diocese. His first tour of Bessarabia came in May 1927, when he also met Gurie Grosu, the local Orthodox Metropolitan. The Monsignor was by then under financial pressure to achieve his many goals, and began charity-seeking tours—later in 1927, he visited the Republic of Poland, Czechoslovakia, Weimar Germany, and the Low Countries. In autumn, while praying in Przemyśl Cathedral, he discovered a painting documenting the Moldavian raiding of southern Poland in 1497, which included the martyrdom of several Franciscans. The discovery was communicated through Lumina Creștinului, sparking debate among Romanian historians regarding Stephen the Great's defense of Orthodoxy and his condoning of anti-Catholic violence. He resumed his tours in late 1928, when he met with Pope Pius in Vatican City. On his way there, he visited the Greek Catholic Eparchy of Lugoj and the Roman Catholic Diocese of Timișoara, holding mass alongside bishops Alexandru Nicolescu and Augustin Pacha. Robu was set to continue with visits to Western Europe, where he was seeking additional sponsors. The effort was deplored by Adevărul newspaper, which observed that Catholics from the Old Kingdom, who had been outstandingly loyal to the Romanian state, resorted to "begging", whereas their formerly Austro-Hungarian colleagues in Transylvania had no financial worries.

On his return, Robu met with the Romanian Premier, Iuliu Maniu, demanding that his diocese be awarded "100 hectares of arable land, as per the law on religious affairs." He had disputes with Romanian officials over various other issues, such as the right to both advertise and receive state stipends for Catholic schools in Iași and Galați. Like Cisar, he began looking into political Catholicism—but surpassed his predecessor in suggesting that Catholics needed to have their own representatives in Parliament, as a way of protecting their communal interests. He and Glaser also encountered a specific problem in Bessarabia, where many churchgoers, especially those in relationships with people of other faiths, ignored marriage as a sacrament, but still attended regular services.

=== Within Catholic anti-Nazism ===
In 1930, Robu obtained that the parishes of Bukovina be separated from the Archdiocese of Leopolis and transferred to Iași's jurisdiction. During late September 1931, he was triumphally received in Rădăuți by the multiethnic Bukovinan Catholics, also meeting representatives of various other religious denominations". As reported by Iași's daily Opinia, his silver jubilee as a priest (April 1932) witnessed an outpouring of love from his congregants (who appreciated his "spiritual kindness and self-sacrifice"); it was also celebrated with a banquet hosted by the Catholic Action. By 1934, Robu was directing efforts toward the establishment of a free clinic, designed to alleviate the suffering of Iași's poorest. As publisher, he curated works of Moldavian Catholic history by Vladimir Ghika and Giorge Pascu, and a Romanian dictionary, by August Scriban. As noted by journalist György Beke, he was personally invested in Romanianization efforts, assigning Hungarian-speaking priests to Romanian-speaking parishes, and vice-versa. Researcher Attila Seres mentions Hungarian period reports, claiming that Robu recruited seminarians from the villages of Csángó Land, and then discouraged them from even speaking Hungarian.

Later in the interwar era, Robu was involved in spreading the Catholic critique of Nazism. In April 1933, he deplored the racial laws introduced in Nazi Germany, noting that "the Roman Catholic Church has always defended Jews"; he admired "Jewish solidarity [as] a model to follow". In tandem, Robu voiced some criticism of the Romanian Jewry, since "Jewish newspapers" had not been quick to condemn anti-Catholic terrorism in the Republican Spain. After 1935, Robu was also reluctant to fund religious schools for Bukovina Germans, after rumors that these were being used by the Nazified German People's Party. He dealt with a similar crisis among the Bessarabian Germans of Emmental: when their priest was expelled by the state as a Nazi propagandist, Robu had him replaced with Walther Kampe, who had anti-Nazi credentials.

In July 1937, Iași was visited by the Apostolic Nuncio, Andrea Cassulo, in whose presence Robu spoke of Germany as having become a heathen state, suggesting that its religious influence needed to be fully contained. Later that month, after having hosted Cassulo in Bessarabia, Robu and Glaser were Romanian delegates at the Catholic-Action rally in the Polish city of Poznań. In March 1938, after the King of Romania, Carol II, had staged a self-coup, an authoritarian constitution was proclaimed as the new law of the land. Robu, Cisar and the Grand Mufti, Etem C. Mola, were among the first clergymen who agreed to take an oath on this document. In mid-1939, Cassulo was reportedly seeking to obtain from Carol that Robu be made an ex-officio member of the revamped Romanian Senate.

=== 1940s population transfers ===
During the first phases of World War II, Robu's ecclesiastical province grew artificially by absorbing over 5,000 Polish refugees from occupied Poland and Regency Hungary. The bishop himself directed the humanitarian effort to assist these destitute correligionists. The province lost its congregants in Bessarabia and most of Bukovina. During June 1940, these areas were annexed by the Soviet Union, and local Germans were repatriated to their ancestral homeland. Robu ordered Catholic priests to remain in their Bessarabian and Bukovinan parishes, to comfort believers in the face of Soviet repression.

Monsignor Robu had not yet joined Carol's sole official party, the "National Renaissance Front", but did so in July 1940, when it had been renamed "Party of the Nation". In August, as part of the Second Vienna Award, Hungary took Northern Transylvania. The internal backlash resulted in Carol's ouster, and the establishment if a Nazi-aligned "National Legionary State". Later that year, several communities of Regat Germans were given the opportunity to resettle in Nazi Germany. Robu tried to persuade the German priests in his diocese not to join in the trend, though most ended up leaving. In November 1940, he was in Solca for a farewell visit to its German Catholics.

The rump diocese was by then split from within between Romanians and Hungarians, with their respective loyalties; this issue became important after the cession of Northern Transylvania, on the diocese's western border. In May 1941, the Székelys of Bukovina were transported en masse to Hungary, leaving behind four priests. Robu used this as an opportunity to fill up vacant positions among the Csángós, further to the south. The new arrivals strengthened Hungarian nationalism among their parishoners, with Father Antal László, a Székely, openly encouraging the Csángós to emigrate into Hungary. Several families followed his advice and fled across the border. This exodus only ended in winter 1941, when Romanian priests reported their Székely colleagues to the military authorities, forcing them as well to flee into Hungary. Robu himself was upset by the incidents, informing Antal László that he was no longer welcomed anywhere in the diocese.

=== Antonescu years ===
Robu himself continued to uphold Catholic rights during Ion Antonescu's pro-Nazi regime (1941–1944). In mid-1941, Romania joined the German invasion of Soviet territory and recovered Bessarabia. The effect of this was that Bessarabian Catholics again came under Robu's jurisdiction. Similarly, Catholic churches in the re-annexed Governorate of Bukovina were assigned to Robu's care. He and Cassulo ensured that Bukovina Jews who had converted to Catholicism were protected from deportation and decimation. By December 1942, Robu's ecclesiastical authority had also been extended into the Transnistria Governorate, organized by Antonescu from parts of the Moldavian and Ukrainian Soviet republics. Through Glaser, and on the request of Romanian officials, he directed Catholic missionary activity in Transnistria, and also blessed military chaplains haded for the Eastern Front.

The bishop was however confronted with the assimilationist agenda imposed from Bucharest, which regarded Catholics as "of foreign origin". Believing that 100,000 Catholics were at risk of being deported by the regime into Hungary, as a population exchange, he asked Cassulo to intervene and obtain that they be instead redirected to Vichy France. In a letter he sent to Antonescu, dated 6 March 1943, Robu demanded civil rights for the Catholics, stressing their loyalty toward Romania. In such exchanges, he complained that his parishoners were no longer issued certificates of racial confirmity; he also noted that local potentates habitually described them using anti-Magyar slurs, which, in his description, included Ceangău (the Romanian variant of Csángó). When addressing Antonescu, Robu also noted that Catholics of his diocese were mostly peasants, and as such underrepresented in the intelligentsia. According to historian Laura Iancu, these comments are indirectly about the Csángós, and echo "a recurring theme in ethnographic writings"; she notes however that Robu's emphasis on Catholic compliance with Romanian nationalism clashes with the approach of his parish priests, since the latter had openly endorsed re-Magyarization. As a result of his pleading, Antonescu was persuaded into renouncing population exchanges, and, by August 1943, into declaring that Csángós were a native Romanian ethnographic category.

In March 1944, due to the approach of the Eastern Front, Robu closed the seminary and withdrew with the students to Beiuș, at the opposite end of Romania. He was caught there by Antonescu's toppling in August, upon which Romania sided with the Allied camp. Meeting with repression from the Wehrmacht and the Royal Hungarian Army, he escaped to Finiș, in the Codru-Moma Mountains, during mid-September. He caught double pneumonia and soon died from it. This happened on 27 September, in the Beiuș home of his friend Valeriu Traian Frențiu (who was serving as Greek Catholic Bishop of Oradea).

== Legacy ==
Robu received various posthumous homages, including a special issue of Lumina Creștinului—incorporating material originally prepared as a Festschrift for his 60th birthday. His successor at the diocese was Glaser, as apostolic administrator. As observed by historian Ovidiu Bozgan, he had little chance of being appointed Bishop, due to having evangelized in Antonescu's Transnistria. The pro-Soviet Groza cabinet resisted Pope Pius XII's proposal, Anton Durcovici, since he was non-Romanian and a suspected right-winger. Durcovici was only accepted in 1947, and consecrated in 1948, by which time Romania was Soviet-style people's republic; before his investiture, he had come to be regarded as a Christian socialist. Durcovici became a victim of deteriorating relations with the Holy See: arrested in 1949 as an "imperialistic" agent, he died in Sighet Prison in 1951.

Buried in Beiuș, Robu's remains were moved to the old Roman Catholic cathedral in Iași in 1964. His posthumous relatives include Ioan Robu. Born in November 1944 at Târgu Secuiesc, where his parents had settled for a short while, he grew up in Săbăoani. Here, his family kept all the books that Bishop Robu had published at Presa Bună, until being advised to hide them ahead or a communist-led perquisition. Ioan became a priest in 1968 and an Institute professor in 1977; he was eventually Archbishop in Bucharest, and the first one to serve after the Romanian Revolution of 1989. During his time in office, he became vocal in denying the Csángós' self-identification as Hungarians, viewing them, and his own relatives, as almost completely Romanian. As Beke observed in 1991, this stance was more radical than his ancestor's had been.
