= Markus Glaser =

Imperial Russian-born German cleric

- Bishop of Caesaropolis
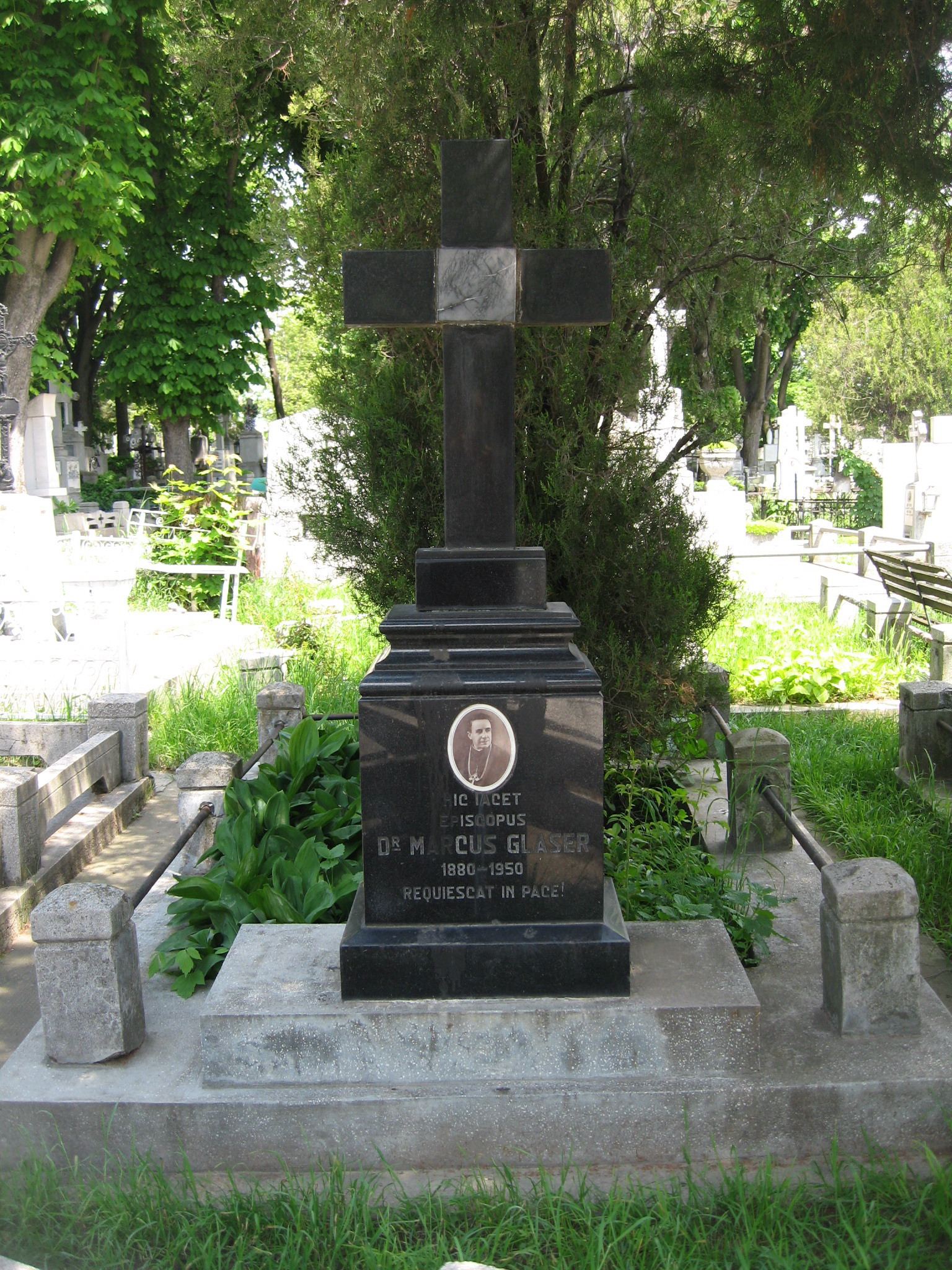
- Glaser's grave in Iaşi
- Church: Roman Catholic
- Diocese: Diocese of Iași
- Successor: Anton Durcovici

Orders
- Consecration: July 1943

Personal details
- Born: 25 April 1880 Landau, Russian Empire
- Died: 25 May 1950 (aged 70) Iași, Romania
- Education: Saratov seminary

Markus or Marcu Glaser (April 25, 1880 – May 25, 1950) was an Imperial Russian-born German cleric, Apostolic Administrator of the Roman Catholic Diocese of Iaşi.

== Biography ==
=== Early career and wartime assignment ===
Born in the village of Landau in what is now Ukraine to a Black Sea German family deported from southern Russia, he studied at the Saratov seminary before continuing his education at the Collegium Germanicum et Hungaricum in Rome. He took a doctorate in philosophy and theology before being ordained in Minsk in 1907. From that year until 1916, he taught at and was deputy director of the Saratov seminary. In 1916, he was transferred to Chişinău, with duties covering the province of Bessarabia until 1920. In 1924, he was named secret chamberlain to Pope Pius XI, and papal prelate in 1930.

In 1939, he was named rector of the Iaşi seminary and in 1942, head of the Catholic mission to the Transnistria Governorate, with his headquarters at Odessa. There, he was consecrated titular bishop of Caesaropolis in July 1943. While in Odessa, he clashed with the German Army and especially the SS, who wanted to stop all religious activity by Catholics in the area. Due to Romania's losses on the Eastern Front, he retreated westward beyond the Prut. In September 1944, following the death of Bishop Mihai Robu, he was named Apostolic Administrator of the Iaşi Diocese.

=== Troubles with the Soviets and death ===
Requests by the nuncio for official recognition of Glaser's position were denied by the Religious Affairs Ministry in April and June 1945. In April 1946, minister Mihai Ralea explained that to do so might anger the Soviet occupiers, as Glaser was born in Ukraine and had been active on what was now Soviet territory. Starting in 1945, he was subjected to a series of lengthy and difficult interrogations before Soviet authorities lasting four years and dealing with his activity in Odessa and Iaşi, as well as a supposed visit to Germany in 1942. He initially refused to appear and only did so after repeated threats from NKVD officers.

He headed the diocese until late 1947 when Anton Durcovici was named bishop, remaining vicar general. As such, he accompanied the bishop on pastoral visits and helped administer chrism. Following the arrest of Durcovici in June 1949, he once again took over the running of the diocese, but the authorities of the new communist regime prevented him from carrying out his regular duties. In 1950, Glaser was repeatedly questioned by the Securitate secret police in Iaşi, triggering a heart attack. He died that May in circumstances that remain unclear, and was buried in the Eternitatea cemetery.
