= Petru Gherghel =

Romanian prelate of the Catholic Church (born 1940)

His Excellency Petru Gherghel
- Bishop Emeritus of Iași
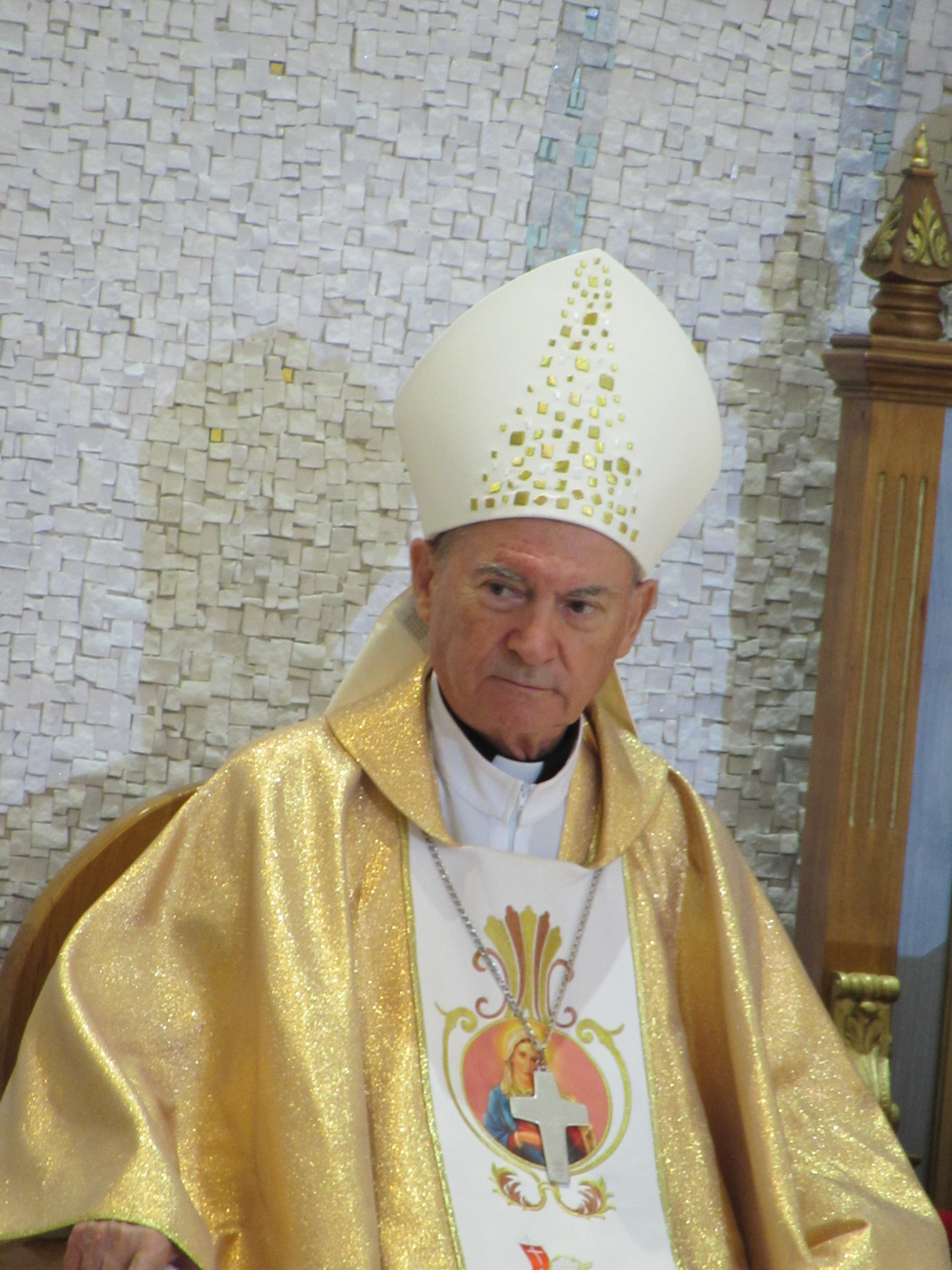
- Bishop Gherghel in 2021
- Church: Roman Catholic
- Diocese: Diocese of Iași
- Appointed: 14 March 1990
- Installed: 1 May 1990
- Term ended: 6 July 2019
- Predecessor: Anton Durcovici (to 1951); Petru Pleșca (unrecognized; to 1977); Himself (as apostolic administrator)
- Successor: Iosif Păuleț

Orders
- Ordination: 29 June 1965
- Consecration: 1 May 1990 by Angelo Sodano

Personal details
- Born: 28 June 1940 (age 86) Gherăești, Neamț County, Kingdom of Romania
- Education: Roman Catholic Theological Institute of Iași
- Motto: Ut Omnes Unum Sint

Petru Gherghel (born 28 June 1940) is a Romanian prelate of the Catholic Church, serving as the Bishop of Iași from 1990 to 2019. Born into a Catholic family in Western Moldavia, he identifies as an ethnic Romanian and has carried out public debates with those who see all or most Moldavian Catholics as "Csángós" or Hungarians; he is sometimes polemically depicted as a self-denying Csángó, but rejects the label altogether. His ordination and initial activity took place under the communist regime, when the Church was semi-repressed and the diocese was run by four successive ordinaries. During the regime's national-communist phase, marked by Nicolae Ceaușescu's ascendancy as communist leader, the Holy See was afforded more recognition. From 1978, the Church could appoint apostolic administrators, with Gherghel serving as such, at Iași, down to 1990. His views on the Csángó issue controversially aligned with Ceaușescu's; as a high-ranking clergyman, he was also automatically assigned to the national leadership of the Front of Socialist Unity and Democracy—where he endorsed the official discourse about world peace. Such positions required a degree of cooperation with the authorities, leading him to be criticized by Eduard Ferenț, the more outspokenly anti-communist priest.

Gherghel's promotion to bishop, countersigned by Pope John Paul II, came just months after by the Romanian Revolution of 1989. In the new political climate, Gherghel expressed himself as a monarchist. He remained generally opposed to the Csángó ascendancy throughout the 1990s, though he also presided upon the religious festivals at Cacica, where he welcomed Hungarian worshipers and recited parts of the Catholic mass in Hungarian. As a promoter of ecumenism, he cultivated respectful relations with the Romanian Orthodox Church and the local Jewry. Before his resignation in 2019, he also softened his Romanian nationalism, allowing the mass to be given in Hungarian in various parish churches under his direct supervision.

== Early life ==
Gherghel was born on 28 June 1940 in Gherăești, Neamț County. He is the youngest of nine children born to a Catholic peasant family. Catholics of his native area are often described as "Csángós", and regarded as a branch of the larger Hungarian community. Hungarian sources such as historian Gábor Vincze and journalist Szabolcs Rostás argue that the bishop is himself Csángó by birth; similarly, Meinolf Arens, fellow of the International Institute for Nationalities Law and Regionalism, sees him as "hav[ing] Moldavian Csángó roots". Gherghel has questioned both the label and its general validity. Following researcher Dumitru Mărtinaș, he has argued that local Catholics have "diverse origins", mainly descending from Romanian Transylvanian migrants to Western Moldavia. Overall, he denies that Csángós form a distinct ethnic group, preferring to view the term as a byword for Romanian Moldavian Catholics, which he regards as largely integrated with their Orthodox brethren.

After completing seven grades of school in his native village, Gherghel moved to Iași, where he graduated from a cantors' school in 1959. He embraced this career at the peak of a conflict between the Romanian Catholic Church and the communist regime, during which the Iași Diocese was only granted informal state recognition, under ordinaries. The third one of these was Petru Pleșca. Also of putative Csángó background, he was secretly consecrated a bishop, but publicly stood for obedience toward the communists. As such, in 1956 he persuaded the authorities into reopening the Roman Catholic Theological Institute of Iași. The second phase of Pleșca's mandate coincided with the rise of a reformist communist leader, Nicolae Ceaușescu. As noted in 2018 by the Csángó historian László Petres, Pleșca managed to placate the new political factors by adhering to their national-communist agenda, resulting in "a very special relationship" between the Diocese and the Romanian Communist Party.

Young Gherghel defied communist orders by befriending Alexandru Todea, a former political prisoner and clandestine bishop of the still-banned Greek Catholic Church. He and Todea met several times, in secrecy, in places such as Vatra Dornei and Iași. Gherghel himself graduated from the Theological Institute, and was ordained to the priesthood in Alba Iulia on 29 June 1965 by Áron Márton, as the local Catholic bishop. He then served at the parish in Barticești until 1967, followed by a period in Rădăuți. From autumn 1970, he taught moral theology at his alma mater, obtaing a full professorship on 1 December, and rising to director in March 1975. These activities ran through the remaining years of Pleșca's mandate (to 1977) and during his short-term replacement as ordinary, Andrei Gherguț (1977–1978).

== Administrator ==
By early 1978, Ceaușescu was mending relations with the Holy See, resulting in a "tacit agreement" whereby the Diocese could be granted its own apostolic administrators. On 21 February, Pope Paul VI named Gherghel to that position, with his installation taking place on 4 April. During the following twelve years, a number of churches were built and parishes opened in the diocese, as well as a new seminary building; nearly 150 priests were ordained, with some of them being sent abroad to study. The mandate also generated controversy, since Gherghel's beliefs on the Csángó issue seemingly agreed with Ceaușescu's national-communism. As noted by scholar Sayfo Omar, Gherghel "consistently swept aside every initiative that tried to secure the use of the Hungarian language in the church."

As Arens observes, Gherghel continued in the same line as Pleșca, both when it came to the "unprecedented, accelerated church construction" and the "successful Romanization of the deeply religious Csángós"—under the official guidelines, mass could only be delivered in Romanian. The same scholar argues that, within this setting, "the local clergy also functioned as a control apparatus, in many places." Church officials were themselves expected to cooperate with the UM 0544, a special unit of the Securitate which had infiltrated Csángó villages to monitor Hungarian nationalism. A surviving report by one Securitate spy indicates that historian Ion Dumitriu-Snagov, who had upheld the official narrative, was also a colonel in the UM 0544—and also that Gherghel had been made aware of this fact.

On 17 January 1980, Gherghel joined the central committee of the Front of Socialist Unity and Democracy (FDUS), which offered ex-officio membership to state-sanctioned religious leaders. The FDUS promotional system became mired in controversy in late 1982, when the anti-communist priest Eduard Ferenț refused to be rubber-stamped as a central committee man. Ferenț was dispatched to a rural posting in Cleja; as Ferenț noted in 2011, Gherghel did nothing to oppose this act of repression.

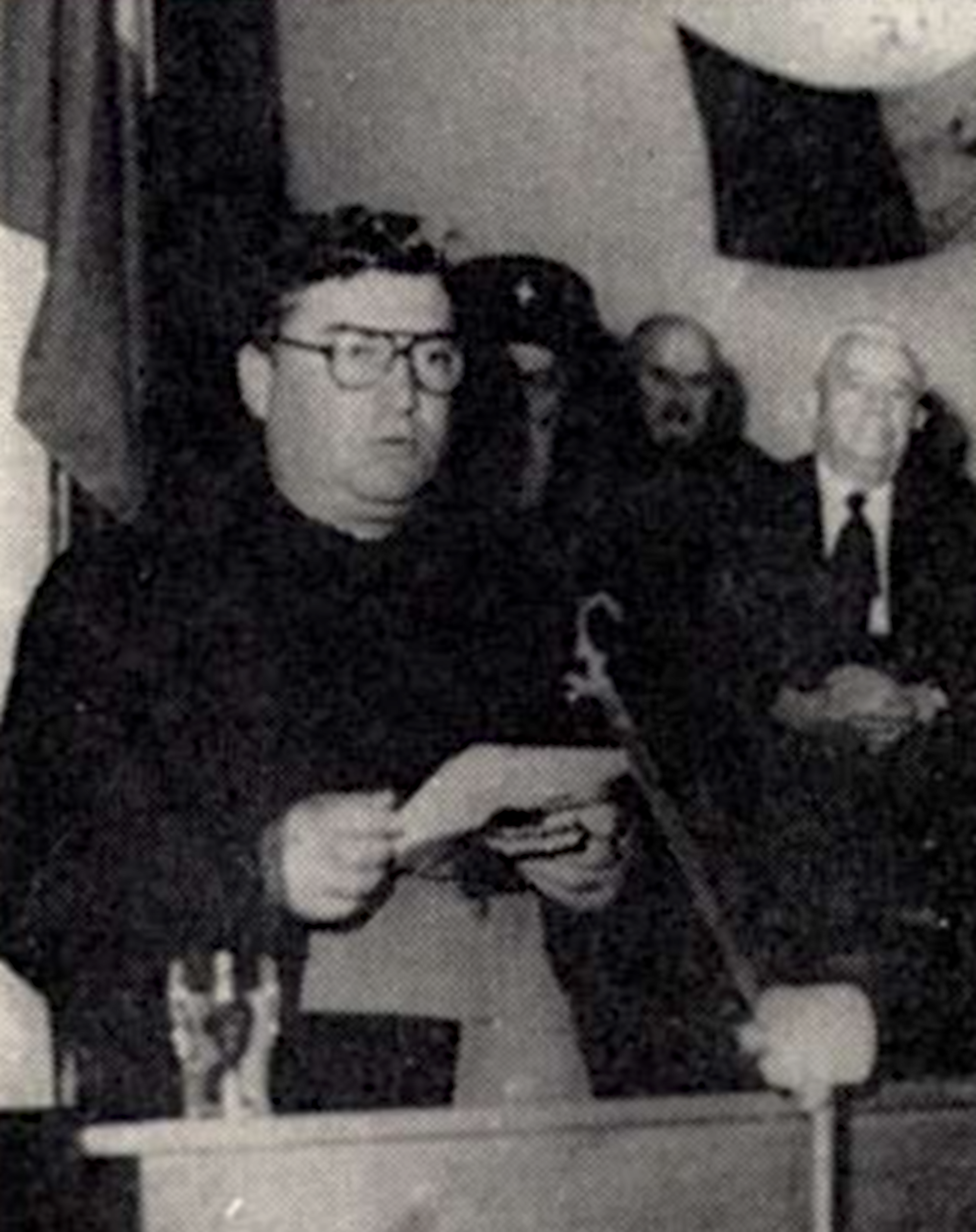
Gherghel on 1 August 1989, addressing an Inter-faith conference organized in Bucharest by the Front of Socialist Unity and Democracy

Gherghel was allowed to visit Rome in 1983, to witness the beatification of a national preacher, Jeremiah of Wallachia. The group of pilgrims also included the physician Márton Benedek, who had taken orders without the communist regime's consent, and who was outed as such during the trip. Benedek was therefore persecuted by Securitate agents upon his return, and down to his death in 1986; he was himself beatified in 2011. Gherghel, meanwhile, maintained his FDUS position. In May 1986, when Ceaușescu and the Front organized in Bucharest an international theological conference to honor International Year of Peace, Gherghel was a guest speaker. He described the push for world peace as implicit in Christology.

== Becoming a bishop ==
Following the Romanian Revolution of 1989, the Romanian Catholic dioceses were again under papal control, and apostolic administrators could be raised to the rank of bishop. Gherghel was promoted in this manner by Pope John Paul II, on 14 March 1990. As he notes, state recognition was delayed, due to "some hesitation" from the Ministry of Religious Affairs. His consecration took place on 1 May at the seminary, and was officiated by Archbishop Angelo Sodano, a representative of the Pope. In an April 1990 interview, the new bishop stated his willingness to work for "true ecumenism" (mainly as a dialogue with the majority Romanian Orthodox), and took pride in noting that Romanian Catholics were patriots—as with Andrei Lupu of Luizi-Călugăra, the first recorded casualty of the Romanian war of independence. He chose as his Latin motto Ut Omnes Unum Sint (John 17: "So that they may all be one"), hinting at spiritual unity. His eccelesiastical coat of arms displays images of Christ and the Holy Virgin alongside the Seminary and Our Lady Queen Cathedral in Iași.

Gherghel also took the initiative in maintaining good relations between Hungarian and Romanian Catholics. For Assumption Day 1992, he allowed a major celebration by Csángós, inviting János Szőke to deliver mass in Hungarian, in the open fields of Cacica. Ahead of this event, he declared that "national antagonism cannot prevail in faith", and expressed his enduring admiration for the ethnically Hungarian Bishop Márton. The bishop himself officiated, uttering some of the sacred formulas in Hungarian. As noted by a local reporter, this "was a great surprise for us, because until now Bishop Gherghel has made himself known as a Moldavian persecutor of the Hungarian language." Weeks before, József Tempfli, as the Bishop of Oradea Mare, had publicly criticized his colleague for still not allowing the Hungarian mass in Pârjol and Oituz, despite petitions sent in by Csángó churchgoers. Later that year, Gherghel and Ioan Robu (his Archbishop in Bucharest), oversaw a scientific conference which resumed ethnographic investigations into the Catholic community of Săbăoani, aiming to debunk Csángó viewpoints.

Gherghel's mandate also witnessed Mother Teresa's visit to Bacău (September 1992), as well as his own proposal to welcome the pope on an official visit. The latter project, first voiced in May 1993, was met with indignation by Petre Țurlea of the governing Democratic Front of National Salvation. Țurlea argued that any such visit required vetting by Orthodox officials; he personally resented John Paul for having taken sides in the Yugoslav Wars. Returning to Cacica for Annunciation Day 1993, Gherghel endorsed John Paul's stances on moral and social teachings. Addressing a crowd of 7,000 youths from across Europe, he preached the right to life as a core tenet of the newly promulgated Catechism of the Catholic Church. In tandem, he was supervising contacts with Orthodoxy: in October 1996, he reprimanded his fellow Catholics for not having shown enthusiasm for the relics of Saint Andrew, brought to Iași by Orthodox hierarchs. He described Andrew as "the apostle of all the Romanians".

After the general election of November 1996, Gherghel and the Orthodox Metropolitan, Daniel Ciobotea, attended a public function of the victorious Christian Democratic National Peasants' Party. In his speech for the occasion, Gherghel gave praise to Peasantists' religious messaging and their stated monarchism. In January 1997, he left for Kenya, preparing the ground Romanian Catholic missionary activity in Africa. In May 1997, the bishop welcomed at Iași the former King of Romania, Michael I, and his wife Anne, whom he regarded as symbols of national unity. To his surprise, the titular queen addressed his parishoners in Romanian, after having been spoken to in French. An historic ecumenical meeting took place at Durău Monastery in July 1998, when Metropolitan Daniel hosted Gherghel and Romania's Chief Rabbi, Menachem Hacohen.

== Old age and retirement ==
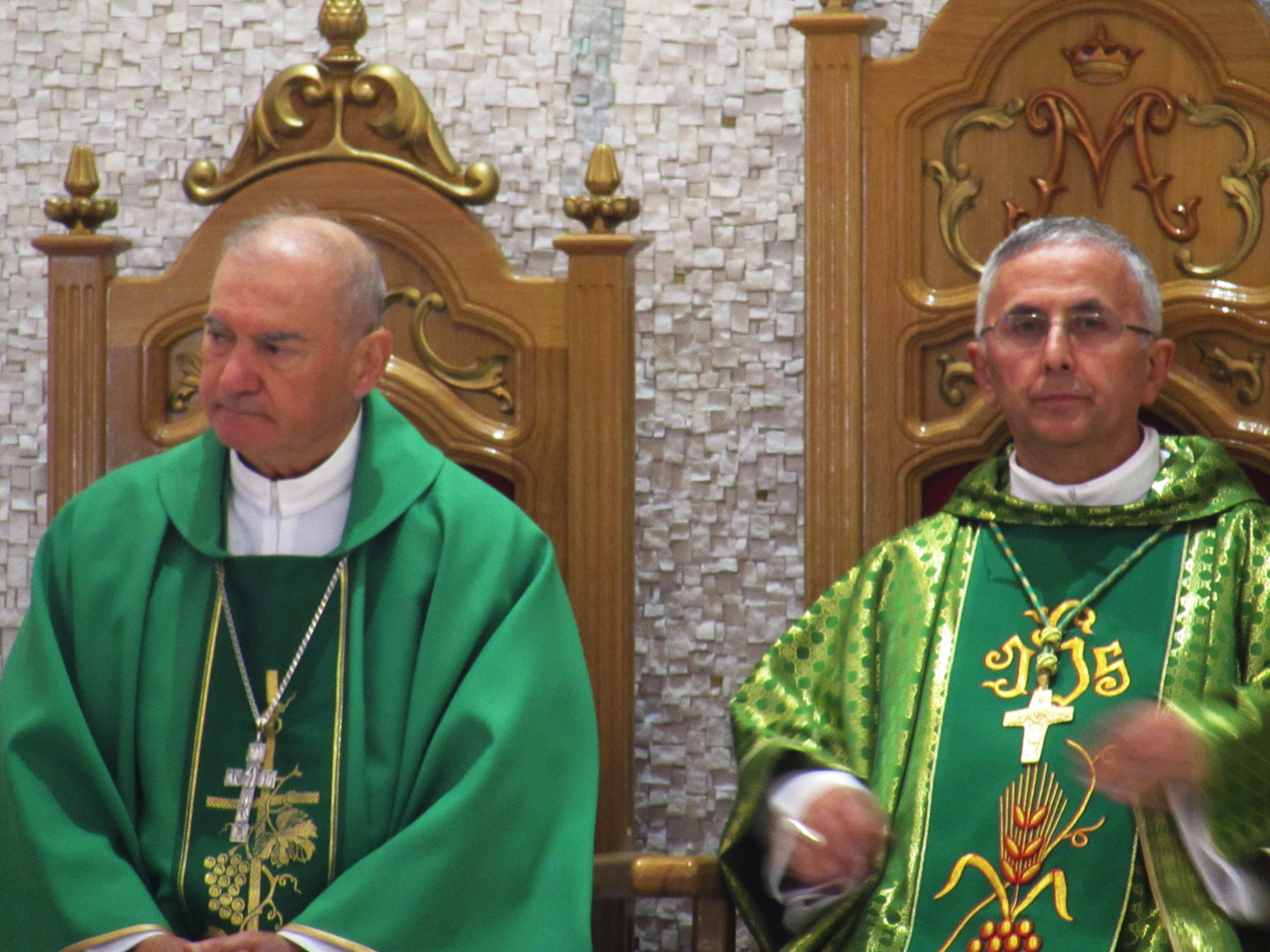
Gherghel and his successor Iosif Păuleț in October 2019

In December 2000, Gherghel was awarded the National Order of Faithful Service, Officer rank. During that period, he had personally received another petition by Pârjol's Hungarians to have services in their preferred language, but "rejected the request citing various reasons." He continued to support alternatives to the Csángós' self-identification as Hungarians, but, according to Bihari Napló journalists, did so more discreetly. As such, he prefaced an ethnographic album by Ion H. Ciubotaru, which he presented in Vatican City, and which casually defined all Moldavian Catholics as Romanians. By 2001, he and Robu had resumed radical stances on the matter. Addressing a nationalist public in Cluj-Napoca, he announced that he had no intention to allow sermons in languages other than Romanian, implying that the Csángó dialect was made-up, and that the signatures in favor of Hungarian services were collected through fraud.

During a 2002 conference, Gherghel confronted his Hungarian critics, explaining that he did not deny that Hungarians existed as part of his congregation, alongside more numerous Romanians, but that he refused to conflate the communities as Csángós, and that he regarded the term as a slur. He also denied claims that priests acting in his jurisdiction had ever been instructed to call Hungarian "the devil's language". Also that year, the bishop appeared on television alongside the Education Minister, Ecaterina Andronescu. Confronted about the Csángós' demands, he conceded that many congregants only spoke Hungarian at home, but insisted that the "order of the Church" was for services to be held in a language that was known to the majority.

Gherghel and Robu's stance on the Csángós continued to be seen as discriminatory by their various critics. Writing in 2005, Arens called for the Holy See to consider retiring them, depicting their presence at the helm of their respective dioceses as an "ecclesiastical scandal". In March 2009, after revelations that a Catholic priest in Pârgărești was stopping his flock from taking Hungarian classes, László Tőkés, who was MEP for a Hungarian Romanian constituency, demanded accountability from Gherghel. The latter responded by condemining instead the intrusion of non-Catholics such as Tőkés, who, in his definition, were sowing "hostility and discord" in an otherwise tight religious community.

In January 2012, Gherghel agreed to meet with a delegation of the Csángó Council, presided upon by András Duma, hearing their demands and holding a collective prayer with them. According to one report from 2017, the bishop had allowed the parish priest of Vizantea-Livezi to say prayers in Hungarian, but made displays of the church statue, depicting Ladislaus I of Hungary, conditional on his personal approval. Gherghel first spoke of his upcoming retirement in early 2019, ahead of Pope Francis' visit to Iași. This announcement came alongside news that masses would also be given in Hungarian for the parishioners of Bacău Diocese; while noting rumors connecting these events, Sayfo Omar argues that the walkback was most likely caused by the Csángós' declining numbers, making them seem nonthreatening. Gherghel kept his office to 6 July 2019, when Francis accepted his resignation; Iosif Păuleț was appointed as his successor.
