= Gherghel =

Gherghel is a Romanian surname. Notable people with the surname include:

- Al. Gherghel (1879–1951), Romanian poet
- Ioan Gherghel (born 1978), Romanian swimmer
- Petru Gherghel (born 1940), Romanian Catholic prelate
