= Shyrokolanivka =

Village in Mykolaiv Oblast, Ukraine

Shyrokolanivka Широколанівка
- Village
- Location in Ukraine Shyrokolanivka (Ukraine)
- Coordinates: 47°10′03″N 31°26′01″E
- Country: Ukraine
- Oblast: Mykolaiv Oblast
- Raion: Mykolaiv Raion
- Hromada: Stepove rural hromada
- Founded: 1810

Area
  - Total: 3.494 km^{2} (1.349 sq mi)

Population
  - Total: 1,833
- Time zone: UTC+2 (EET)
  - Summer (DST): UTC+3 (EEST)
- Postal code: 57063
- Area code: +380 5163
- Former name: Landau (1810—1944)

Shyrokolanivka (Ukrainian: Широколанівка; Russian: Широколановка) is a village in the Mykolaiv Raion of the Mykolaiv Oblast in southern Ukraine. It is located along the east bank of the Berezan River.

== Name ==
The name Landau was used for the settlement until 1935. The village was renamed imeni Karla Libknekhta (имени Карла Либкнехта) from 1935 to 1945. It was renamed Shyrokolanivka after the remaining German residents were driven from the area by the advancing Soviet army.

== History ==
The village was established in 1810 as Landau by Roman Catholic German immigrants to the Beresaner Valley, then part of the Kherson Governorate of the Russian Empire. Most of the colonists (66 families) came from Rheinhessen-Pfalz, and others (27 families) from Alsace. A teachers' training school was founded in the village in 1907. Later, a girls' school was established, as well as a poor house and an orphanage. The population of Landau in 1918 was 1,363. In the 1930s, the Soviet authorities moved against the churches in the area. The Catholic church in Landau was converted into a parachute-jumping platform. The Orthodox church and cemetery in Landau were destroyed and a theater was built at the site; in the fall of 1937, the theater was the venue for a show trial against parish priests in the region (including the Landau parish priest, Anton Hoffmann) accused of anti-Soviet activity. Father Hoffmann was sent to a forced labor camp, where he died.

== Notable people ==
- Markus Glaser (1880–1950): cleric, Apostolic Administrator of the Roman Catholic Diocese of Iaşi
- Michael Seifert (1924–2010): SS guard in Italy during World War II

== See also ==
- Flight and evacuation of German civilians during the end of World War II
