= Anton Durcovici =

Romanian prelate

Blessed Anton Durcovici
- Bishop of Iași
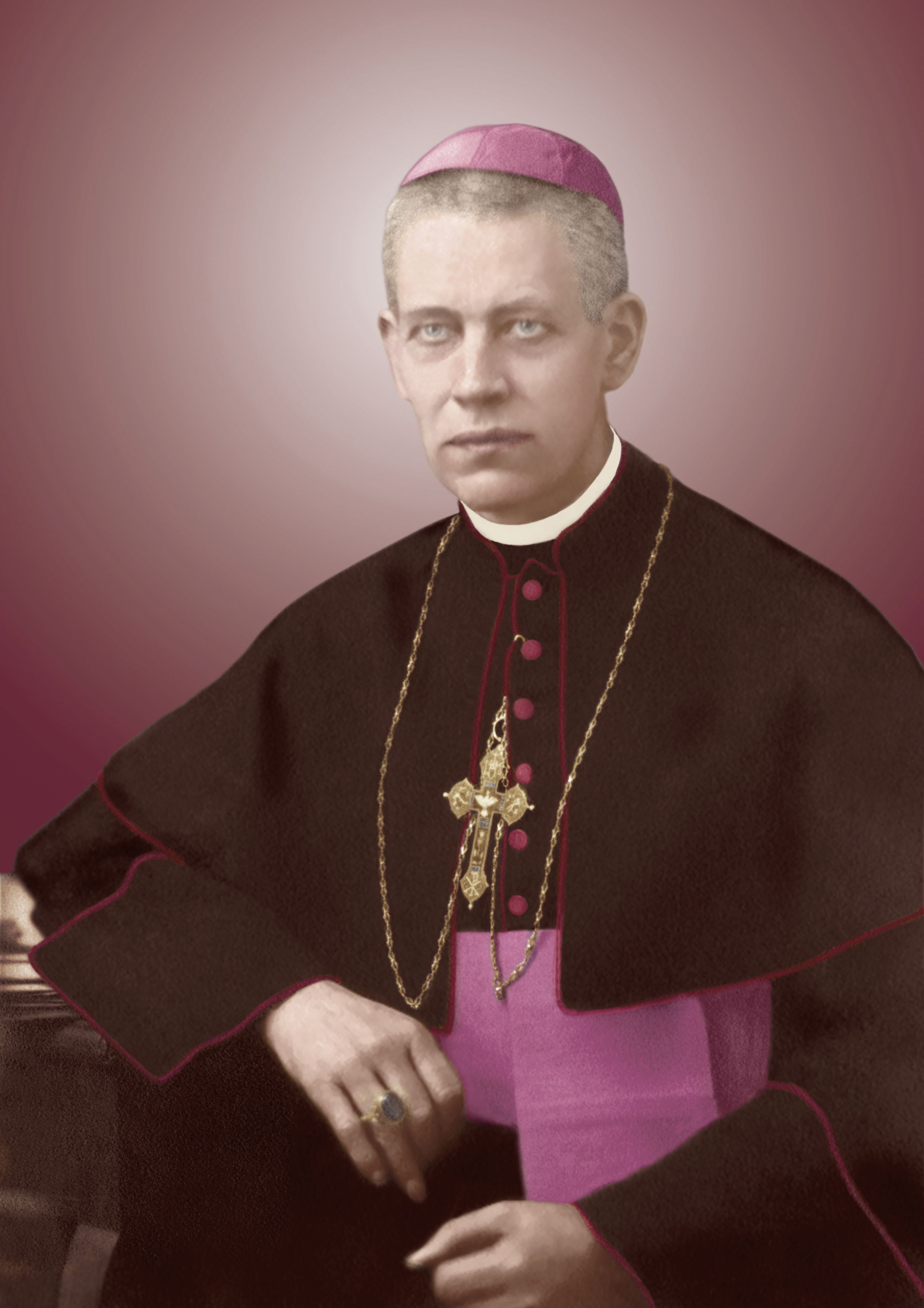
- Church: Roman Catholic Church
- Diocese: Iași
- See: Iași
- Appointed: 30 October 1947
- Installed: 14 April 1948
- Term ended: 10 December 1951
- Predecessor: Mihai Robu
- Successor: Petru Gherghel
- Previous post: Apostolic Administrator of București (1948–49)

Orders
- Ordination: 24 September 1910 by Pietro Respighi
- Consecration: 5 April 1948 by Gerald Patrick O'Hara

Personal details
- Born: Anton Durković; 17 May 1888 Bad Deutsch-Altenburg, Horn, Cislethania
- Died: 10 December 1951 (aged 63) Sighet Prison, Sighetu Marmației, Maramureș County, Romania
- Education: Pontifical Urban University; Pontifical University of Saint Thomas Aquinas; Pontifical Gregorian University
- Motto: Beatus populus cuius Deus Dominus ("Blessed are the people whose God is the Lord")

Sainthood
- Feast day: 20 December
- Venerated in: Roman Catholic Church
- Beatified: 17 May 2014; Stadionul Emil Alexandrescu, Iași, Romania by Cardinal Angelo Amato
- Attributes: Episcopal attire
- Patronage: Diocese of Iași; Persecuted Christians

Anton Durcovici (17 May 1888 – 10 December 1951) was a Romanian prelate of the Roman Catholic Church and the Bishop of Iași from 1947 until his death. Durcovici was a victim of Romania's Communist regime, under which he was imprisoned; he died while in jail. He was known for being a zealous bishop who visited each parish within the confines of his diocese and known for his efforts in preaching the Gospel to all that he could. He likewise was known for his staunch commitment to the values of the Gospel and for his allegiance to the Church which led to his false arrest and imprisonment at the hands of the communist regime. Durcovici was a professor of seminarians and taught his students subjects such as canon law. His zeal as a priest led to his appointment in Bucharest as a rector for seminarians and his renown in Romania led to his episcopal appointment as a bishop.

The beatification process for the late bishop commenced in the 1990s and culminated in 2013 after Pope Francis approved his beatification; Cardinal Angelo Amato presided over the 2014 beatification on the pope's behalf in Durcovici's old diocese.

== Life ==
=== Childhood and education ===
Anton Durcovici was born on 17 May 1888 as the second of two children in Bad Deutsch Altenburg to Franz Durcovici (1858–5 February 1893) and Maria Mittermeier; he was baptized in the Assumption church on the following 21 May. He left for the Kingdom of Romania together with his widowed mother and his brother Franz; the three settled in Iași in 1895. His father had died from acute tuberculosis in 1893. His father contracted this as a result of his time as a soldier back in the 1878 Bosnian campaign.

His mother sought work as a washerwoman and as a seamstress. His mother's aunt named Österreicher (who became widowed in 1895) lived in Iași where she owned a restaurant. In 1894 she invited her niece to help her with her work so she moved herself and her two children there. In 1895 he began school and learnt the Romanian language. From 1896 to 1898 he lived in Ploiești where he and his brother attended school and in 1898 relocated to 81 Izvor Street in the nation's capital.

From 1898 Durcovici attended the S. Andrei high school (1898–1901) that the Brothers of the Christian Schools in Bucharest managed and it was there that he met the Benedictine monk Lucius Fetz who became impressed with Durcovici and his academic results. He attended the S. Iosif school from 1901 to 1906. On 25 May 1899 he received his Confirmation from the Archbishop of Bucharest Francisc Xaveriu Hornstein. He became an altar server at this time and attended morning Mass before being given a snack and sent to school. It was not long until Fetz interceded to the Archbishop of Bucharest who admitted him to ecclesial studies on 1 September 1901. On 23 October 1906 he received his diploma from Fr. Augustin Kuczka after passing his baccalaureate which listed subjects such as Greek and mathematics. He mastered the Romanian and Greek languages but also studied Hungarian in addition to the traditional Italian language and Latin; he also studied the French language.

It was later in 1906 that he continued his studies in Rome (at the behest of the Archbishop of Bucharest) where he attended the Saint Thomas pontifical college and the Propaganda Fide college where he earned degrees in canon law as well as in philosophical and theological studies; this included two doctorates. From 1910 to 1911 he served as the prefect of studies at the Propaganda Fide college. He used the week before starting his studies in Rome to explore both Rome and Saint Peter's Basilica before beginning his studies on 4 November 1906. In 1910 he was given a Doctor Divinitatis while he obtained a canon law degree in 1911 from the Pontifical Gregorian.

His ordination was postponed due to his age since Durcovici had not reached the required age needed for ordination. But signs seemed to change since Cardinal Girolamo Maria Gotti and the college rector Monsignor Giovanni Bonzano demonstrated signs that both were impressed with Durcovici and his work ethic. This led to a 20-month age waiver being granted to him which would allow for him to be ordained.

=== Priesthood ===
Durcovici received his ordination to the priesthood on 24 September 1910 from Cardinal Pietro Respighi in the Lateran Basilica. On 29 July 1911 he left Rome to return home but before this went on a pilgrimage to Loreto and then travelled onwards to Austria where he celebrated his first Mass in his native village alongside his mother and brother. He returned to Romania on 11 August 1911 where he was appointed as a schoolteacher for seminarians in Bucharest and then as a parish administrator in Tulcea. Durcovici was made a professor of religious education at the S. Iosif high school. Romania's entrance into World War I on the Allied side saw him sent to an internment camp in Moldavia – being an Austrian citizen –, until being freed on the orders of King Ferdinand I. From 1918 to 1922 he taught students in addition to ministering in the Giurgiu parish and it was around this time that he founded the "Unio Apostolica Cleri" to promote vocations and brotherhood among priests. In 1931 King Charles II granted him the Order of the Star of Romania.

Durcovici became the rector to seminarians in Bucharest in 1924 and held the office until April 1948 following his episcopal appointment.

=== Episcopate ===
Pope Pius XII appointed Durcovici as the Bishop of Iași in October 1947 and he received his episcopal consecration on 5 April 1948 from the nation's apostolic nuncio. The co-consecrators were Alexandry Theodor Cisar and Marco Glaser. His episcopal ordination had been postponed for five months – it should have been celebrated in November 1947 – but the communists were opposed to his nomination though soon relented. His consecration took place in the Saint Joseph Cathedral in Bucharest.

He had become an opponent of the post-World War II communist regime who attempted to have him accept a decrease in papal control over Romanian Catholics. Durcovici was placed under surveillance in 1947 and the communists kept a dossier on him (number 84569) and hoped to indict him on some sort of charge. The authorities collected 57 statements from peasants from thirteen villages who were dissatisfied with Durcovici due to his refusal to introduce the Hungarian language into the churches. This enabled the communists to fabricate charges against him. The Securitate soon arrested him (and his colleague Fr. Raffael Friedrich) on 26 June 1949 while he was visiting the congregation of Popești-Leordeni. He was arrested in the streets while he was going to impart the Confirmation sacrament at a parish near the capital which saw him beaten as he was forced into a waiting car.

=== Imprisonment and death ===
He was held in Jilava Prison from June 1949 to 10 September 1951 and then transferred to Sighet Prison together with his fellow bishop Áron Márton and Alexandru Cisar. At Sighet, Durcovici was the target of torture and deprivations. He was put into Cell 13 with no light and heat. In mid-November 1951 he was moved to isolation so he could die alone and so his death would be unknown to others. He was also stripped naked and exposed to the winter weather as well as being denied food and water which led to his death in his cell in the evening on 10 December 1951 as a result of the mistreatment and malnutrition. He was buried in an unmarked grave. Witness accounts state that Durcovici received final absolution through a cell door from a fellow priest prisoner. The communist authorities attempted to erase all evidence of his time in prison and most documents were removed so as to hide his imprisonment.

== Beatification ==
The beatification process was launched under Pope John Paul II on 28 January 1997 after the Congregation for the Causes of Saints titled Durcovici as a Servant of God and issued the "nihil obstat" (no objections) edict that would allow for the cause to commence. The diocesan investigation was launched in Durcovici's old diocese on 25 March 1997 and was later closed on 11 September 1999 after the investigation concluded its assigned work. The C.C.S. later validated the investigation in Rome on 29 October 2010 while receiving the Positio dossier from the postulation from assessment in 2012. Theologians confirmed the cause on 22 February 2013 as did the cardinal and bishop members of the C.C.S. on 24 September 2013.

Pope Francis confirmed on 31 October 2013 that Durcovici had died "in odium fidei" (in hatred of the faith) and confirmed that Durcovici would be beatified. Cardinal Angelo Amato presided over the beatification on the pope's behalf in Romania on 17 May 2014. The apostolic nuncio Francisco-Javier Lozano Sebastían and the Archbishop of Bucharest Ioan Robu both attended the beatification as did 23 thousand people. Cardinal Amato referred to Durcovici in his address as having possessed a "merciful temperament" while Pope Francis – in the beatification apostolic letter – referred to him as a "zealous priest". The Romanian Prime Minister Victor Ponta released a statement for the beatification calling for the unification of all Romanian people irrespective of faith. He issued the statement in light of the beatification which he hoped would inspire unification of all peoples.

The current postulator for this cause is Fr. Isidor Iacovici.

== See also ==
- Áron Márton
- Iuliu Hossu
