= Michael Seifert (SS guard) =

Ukrainian Nazi war criminal (1924–2010)

Michael Seifert (16 March 1924 – 6 November 2010) was an SS guard in Italy during World War II.

He was an ethnic German born in Landau (present-day Mykolaiv Oblast, Ukraine). Dubbed the "Beast of Bolzano", Seifert, who was living in Canada, was convicted in absentia in 2000 by a military tribunal in Verona, Italy, on nine counts of murder, committed while he was an SS guard at the Bolzano Transit Camp, northern Italy. He was sentenced to life in prison.

Canadian authorities initiated denaturalization proceedings against Seifert in 2001, and he was taken into custody in August 2002. Seifert remained in jail until November 2003, when he was released on bail. On 4 August 2007, he was ordered to be returned to jail while awaiting the outcome of his final appeals from the Supreme Court of Canada. The decision was upheld on appeal.

After losing his final appeal, Seifert was extradited to Italy on 17 February 2008. His crimes involved actions taken in a prison camp in Bolzano from 1944 to 1945. At his trial, witnesses accused him of leaving a 15-year-old boy to starve to death, raping and killing a pregnant woman, and gouging an inmate's eyes out.

Avi Benlolo, president of the Friends of Simon Wiesenthal Center for Holocaust Studies in Canada, noted that Seifert's imprisonment "sets an example for other war criminals, not only Nazi war criminals, but war criminals related to Rwanda, Bosnia, Darfur, or any other genocide, that there's no time limit to justice".

After his extradition to Italy from Canada, Seifert was held in an Italian military prison in Santa Maria Capua Vetere. Prosecutors from Italy and Germany intended to interview him regarding other war crimes that may have taken place at Bolzano.

On 25 October 2010, Seifert was transferred to a hospital after he fell down in his cell, resulting in a broken femur. He died from these injuries, combined with gastric complications, nearly two weeks later. Seifert was buried in a cemetery near Caserta after his body went unclaimed by friends and relatives.

== Bibliography ==
- Giorgio Mezzalira and Carlo Romeo (editors): "MISCHA" l'aguzzino del lager di Bolzano. Dalle carte al processo a Michael Seifert, Bolzano, Circolo Culturale ANPI, 2002. Review
