= Assumption of Mary Church, Iași =

Heritage site in Iași County, Romania

Coordinates: 47°09′36″N 27°35′01″E

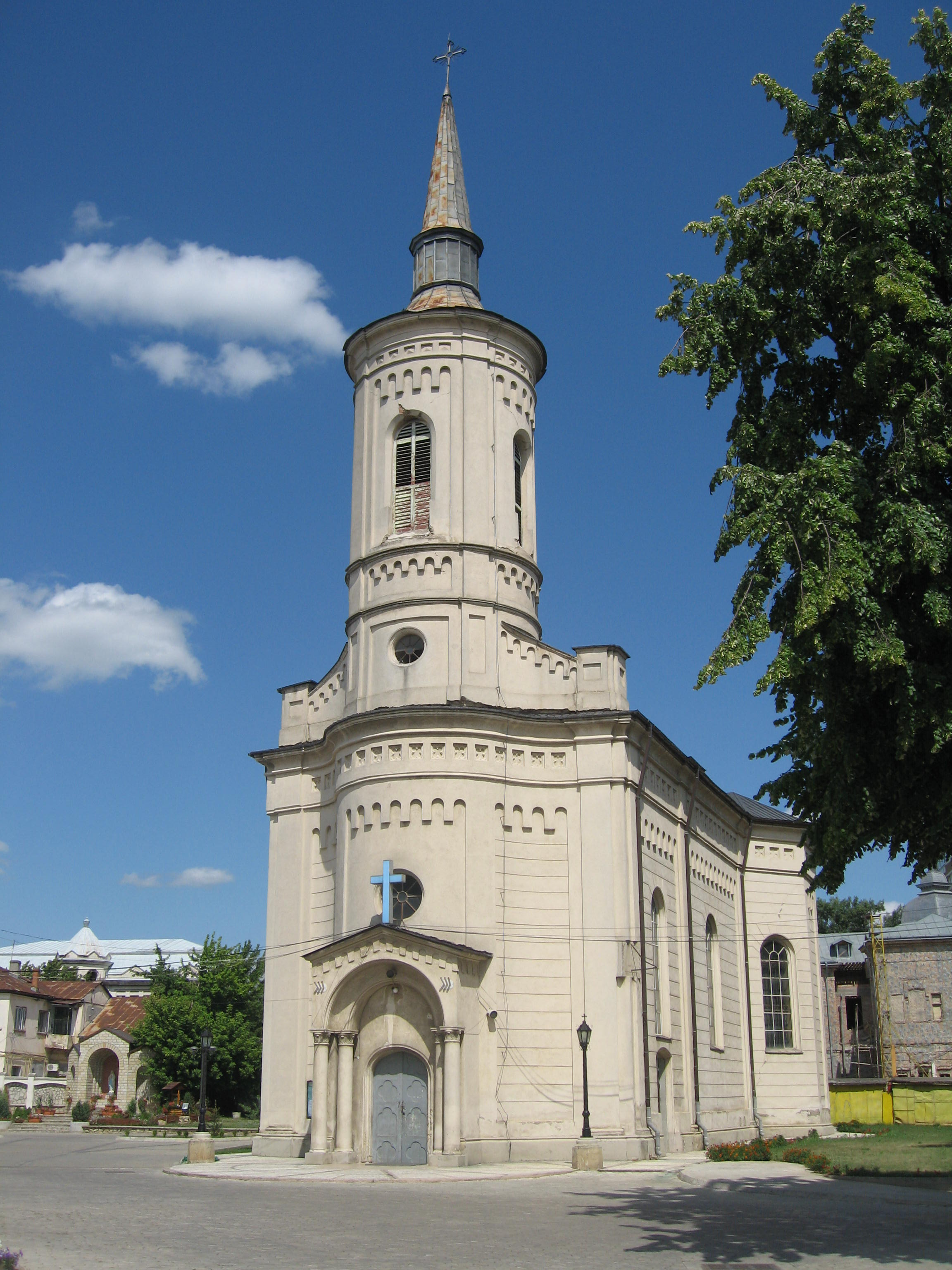
Assumption of Mary Church

The Assumption of Mary Church (Romanian: Biserica Adormirea Maicii Domnului) is a Roman Catholic church located at 26 Ștefan cel Mare și Sfânt Boulevard in Iași, Romania. It is dedicated to the Assumption of Mary.

The first church on the site, with the same dedication, was made of wood and known as the Franciscans' Church (Biserica Franciscanilor). A 1753 document, issued during the reign of Prince Matei Ghica, noted that a Catholic church had stood in Iași since the founding of Moldavia. In 1741, Grigore II Ghica donated two vineyards to the church. Three years later, Stanislau Jezierski, the Catholic bishop of Bacău, noted that the church was small and ready to collapse. Rebuilt in 1763, it was destroyed by fire in 1766. The church was rebuilt in brick starting in 1782, and was blessed in 1789. The ceiling fell during the 1802 Vrancea earthquake, prompting repairs. The fire of 1827, which affected much of the city, destroyed the roof, again necessitating work. In 1861, the priest Ioan Eugeniu Zapolski restored and expanded the church. In 1869, upon the request of Bishop Giuseppe Salandari, the interior was painted by a Franciscan friar from Italy. Salandari was buried in the church upon his death in 1873, as were eleven other bishops and priests. The south wall of the church features a sundial that seemingly dates to 1813. Until the early 19th century, the building was used as a monastery, and was the center of the Franciscan mission. It became a cathedral when the Iași Diocese was set up in 1884.

Built in the Baroque style, the church has a single cylindrical spire, tall and supple, above the entrance; this is also the bell tower. The exterior is plastered with stone dust, but has no special ornamentation. The interior features three marble altars. There is a classical organ with 21 sonic registers, made in Austria. Work on the much larger Our Lady Queen of Iași Cathedral began in the 1990s, and the older building was relegated to a parish church in 2005, when the new cathedral was inaugurated.

The church is listed as a historic monument by Romania's Ministry of Culture and Religious Affairs.

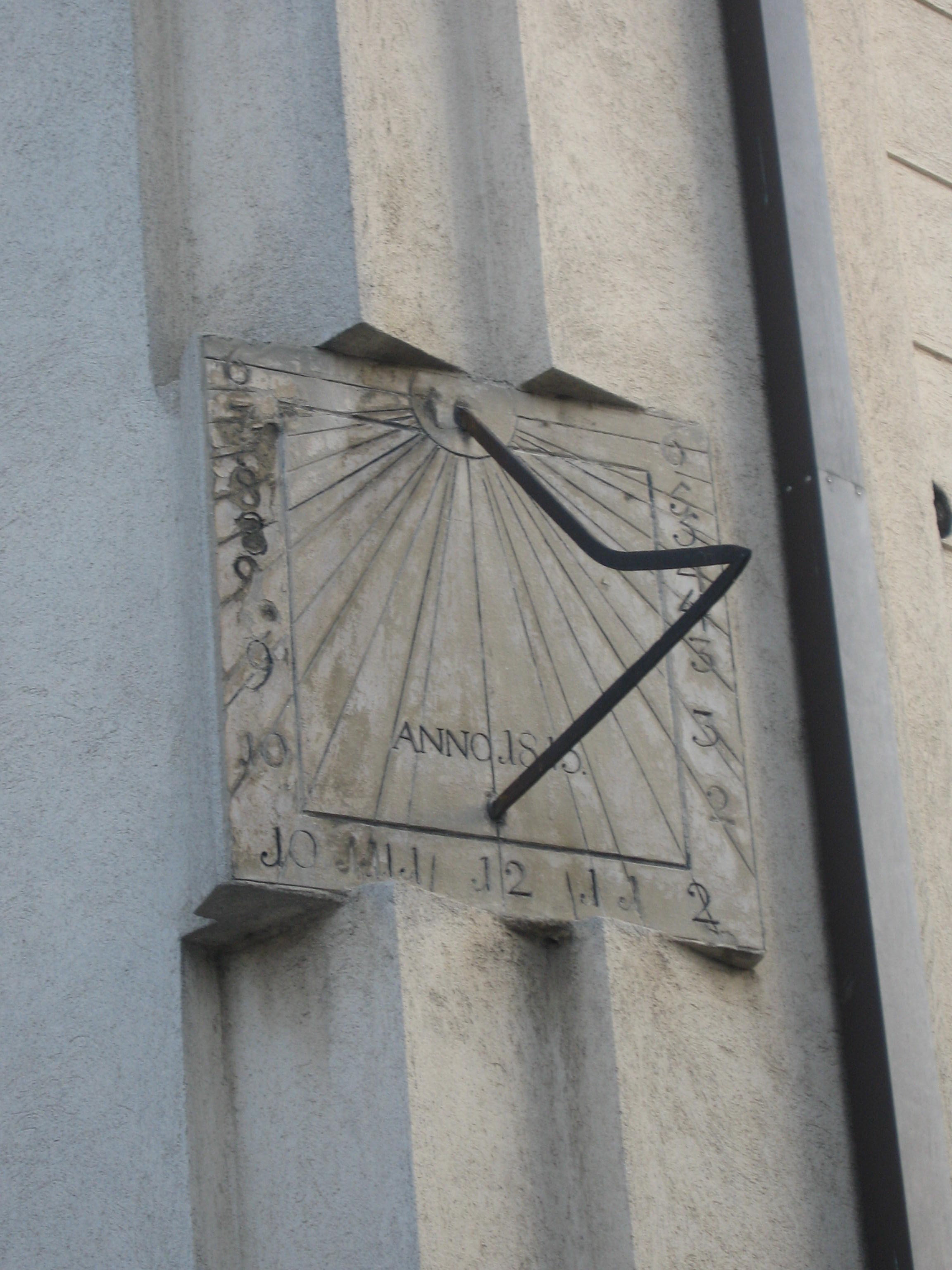
Sundial

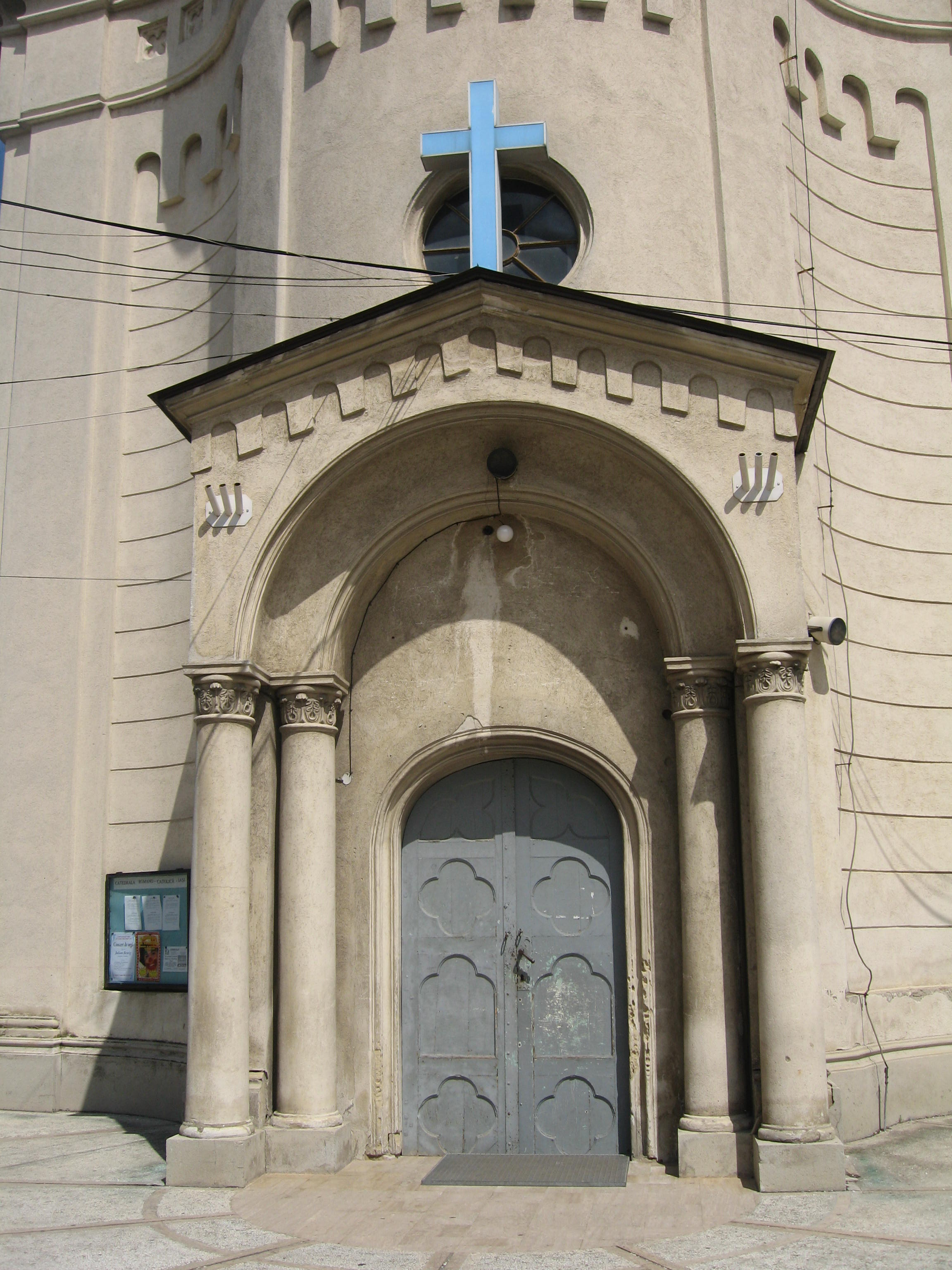
Entrance

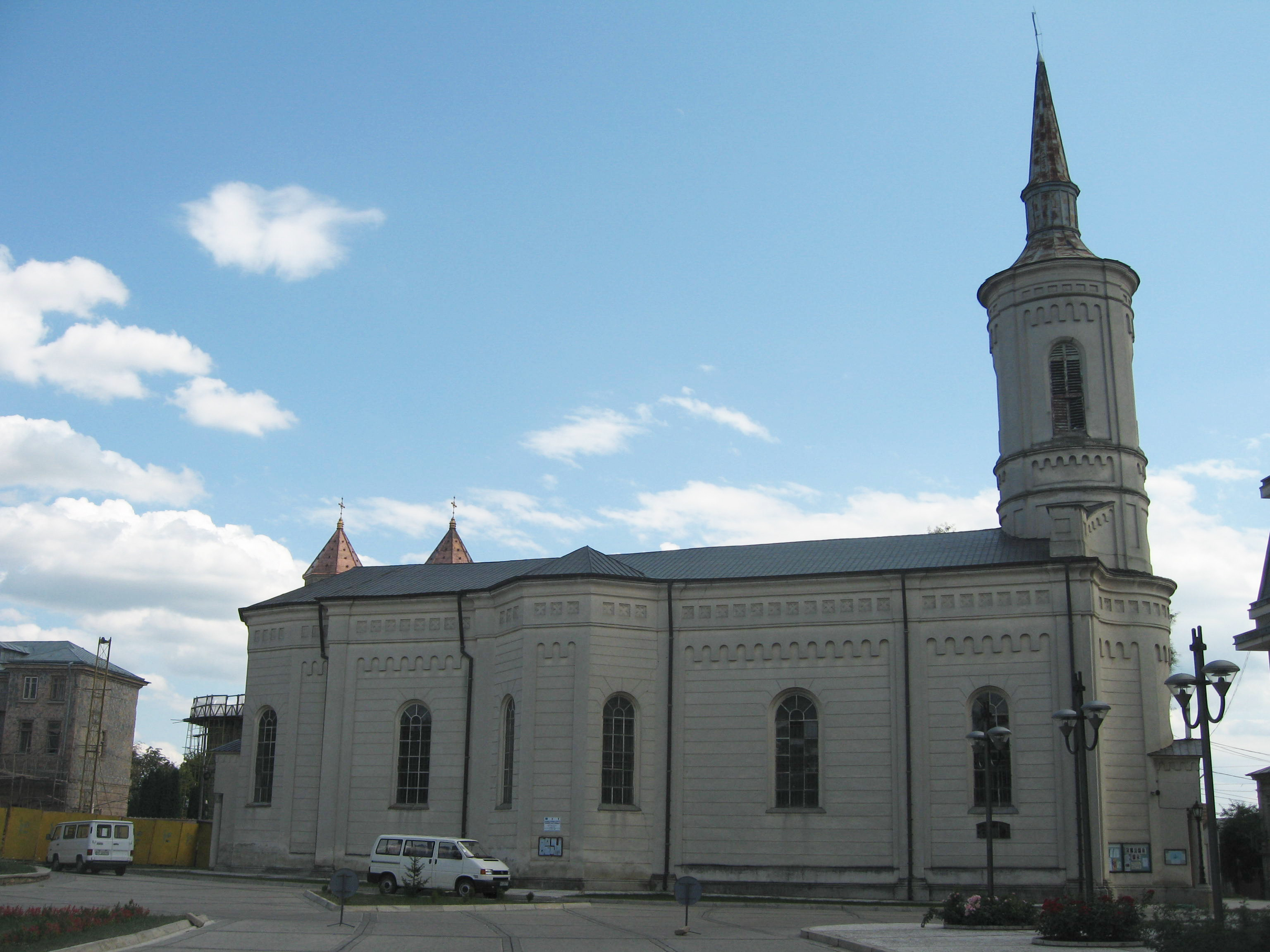
Side view

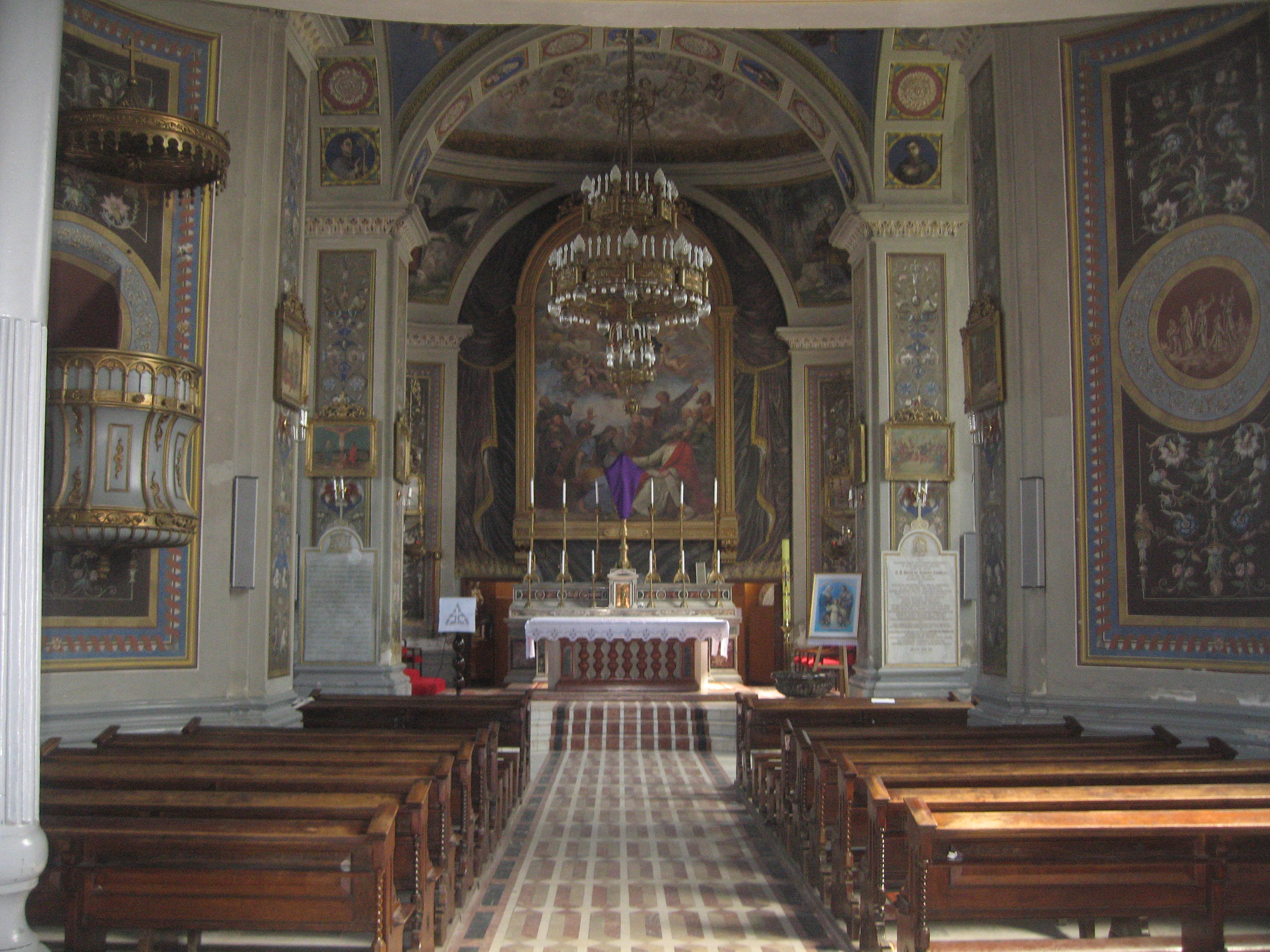
Interior

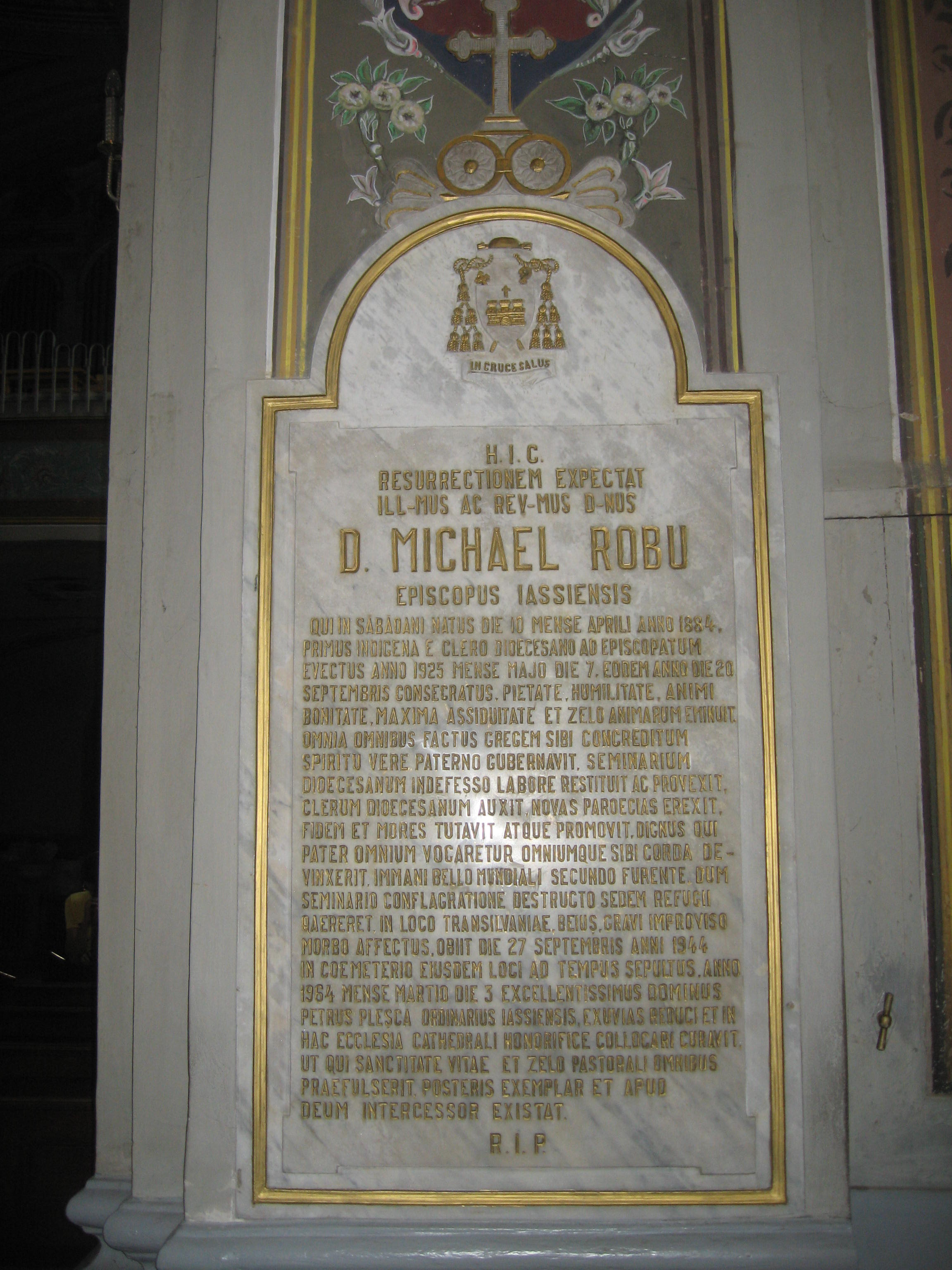
Grave of Mihai Robu

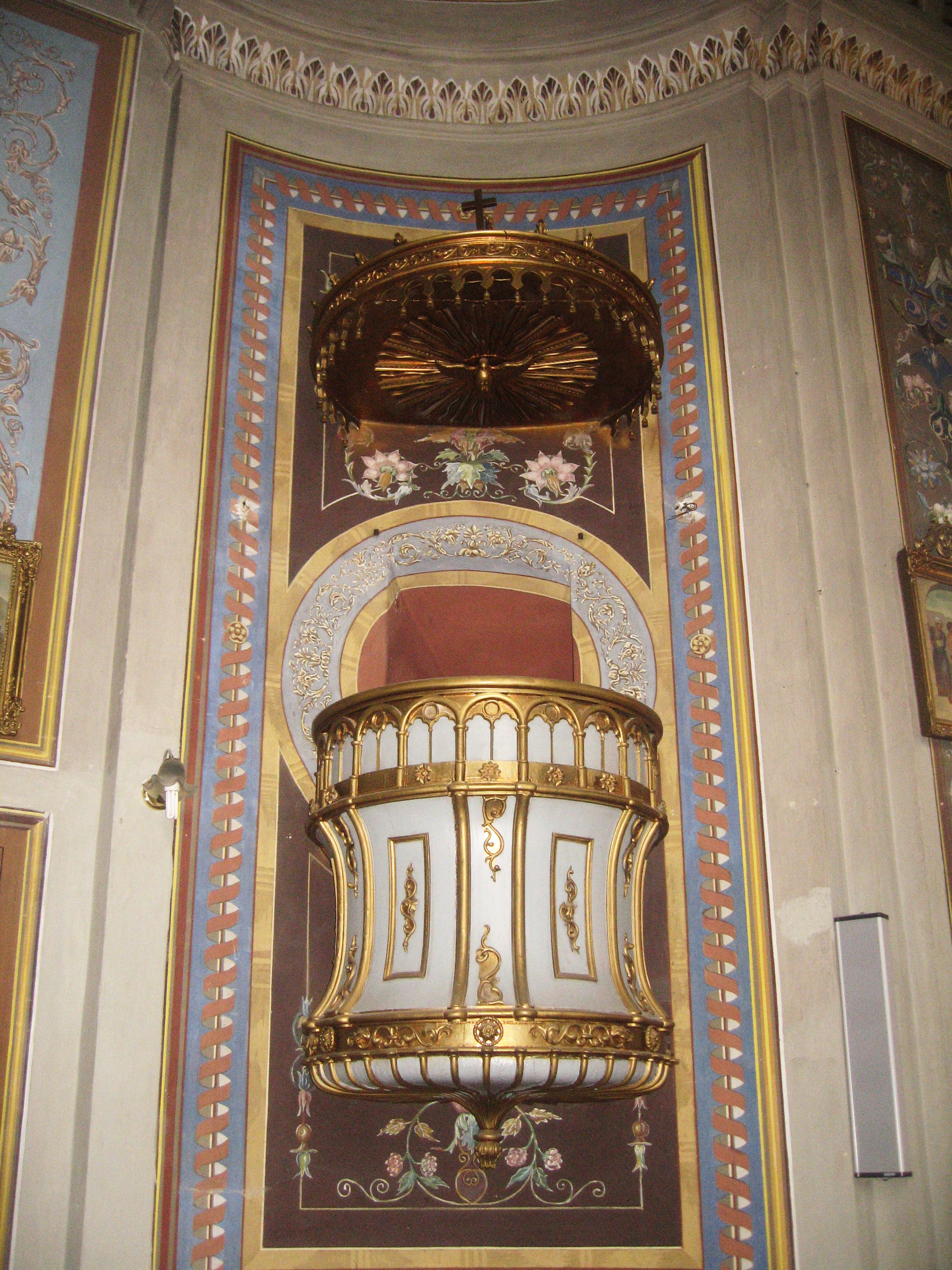
Pulpit
