= Alexandru Cisar =

Romanian cleric, bishop and archbishop

- Archbishop of Bucharest
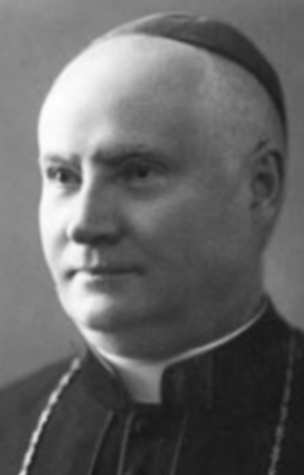
- Church: Catholic Church
- Archdiocese: Archdiocese of Bucharest
- In office: 12 December 1924 – 7 January 1954
- Predecessor: Raymund Netzhammer
- Successor: Ioan Robu
- Previous post: Bishop of Iași (1920-1924)

Orders
- Ordination: 6 June 1903
- Consecration: 15 August 1920 by Raymund Netzhammer

Personal details
- Born: Alexandru Teodor Cisar; 21 October 1880 Bucharest, Principality of Romania
- Died: 7 January 1954 (aged 73) Bucharest, Romanian People's Republic

Alexandru Theodor Cisar (21 October 1880 – 7 January 1954) was a Romanian cleric, bishop of the Roman Catholic Diocese of Iași and archbishop of the Roman Catholic Archdiocese of Bucharest.

Born in Bucharest, he entered that city's seminary in 1892. Sent to Rome in 1899, he was ordained a priest in 1903 at the Congregation for the Evangelization of Peoples. Upon his return to Romania, he was named secretary to Archbishop Joseph-Xavier Hornstein and dean of students at the seminary. After a short time as parish priest at the Bucharest Bărăția and at the Craiova parish, he was named head of a school in Bucharest in 1918. In 1920, he was consecrated bishop at Saint Joseph's Cathedral and was installed in Iași. He reopened the seminary there that had shut down due to World War I. In 1921, the parishes of Bessarabia, recently united with Romania, were incorporated into his diocese. Following the retirement of Archbishop Raymund Netzhammer in 1924, he was named Archbishop of Bucharest. He was also interim Apostolic Administrator of Iași until 1925, when Mihai Robu was named bishop. He remained in office until retiring in 1948 and being named titular bishop of Nicopolis. During 1949–1953, the new communist regime forced him to live at the Franciscan monastery in Orăștie. Twice, with the authorities' approval, he was able to go to Alba Iulia to ordain priests. He was allowed to return to Bucharest in late 1953. He died soon after, and was buried in the Catholic chapel at Bellu Cemetery.
