= Gherăești =

- Commune
- Location in Neamț County

- Location in Romania
- Coordinates: 47°1′N 26°49′E
- Country: Romania
- County: Neamț
- Subdivisions: Gherăești, Gherăeștii Noi, Tețcani

Government
  - Mayor (2024–2028): Ermina Dănculesei (PNL)
- Area: 30.7 km^{2} (11.9 sq mi)
- Elevation: 207 m (679 ft)
- Population (2021-12-01): 4,715
  - Density: 154/km^{2} (398/sq mi)
- Time zone: UTC+02:00 (EET)
  - Summer (DST): UTC+03:00 (EEST)
- Postal code: 617205
- Area code: +40 x33
- Vehicle reg.: NT
- Website: www.primariagheraesti.ro

Gherăești is a commune in Neamț County, Western Moldavia, Romania. It is composed of three villages: Gherăești, Gherăeștii Noi, and Tețcani.

Historical population
Year	Pop.	±%
1992	6,205	—
2002	6,389	+3.0%
2011	4,854	−24.0%
2021	4,715	−2.9%
Source: Census data

At the 2002 census, 100% of the 6,389 inhabitants were Romanians; 89% were Roman Catholic and 10.7% Romanian Orthodox. At the 2021 census, the commune had a population of 4,715; of those, 87.3% were Romanians.

== Natives ==
- Petru Gherghel (born 1940), prelate of the Catholic Church, Bishop of Iași from 1990 to 2019
