= Romanian Old Kingdom =

Period in the history of Romania

The Romanian Old Kingdom (Romanian: Vechiul Regat or just Regat; Hungarian: Regát; German: Regat or Altreich) is a colloquial term referring to the territory covered by the first independent Romanian nation state, which was composed of the Romanian Principalities: Wallachia and Moldavia. The union of the two principalities was achieved when, under the auspices of the Treaty of Paris (1856), the ad hoc Divans of both countries, which were then under Ottoman Empire suzerainty, voted for Alexander Ioan Cuza as their prince. This process achieved a de facto unification under the name of the United Principalities of Moldavia and Wallachia. The region itself is defined by the result of that political act, followed by the Romanian War of Independence, the inclusion of Northern Dobruja and the transfer of the southern part of Bessarabia to the Russian Empire in 1878, the proclamation of the Kingdom of Romania in 1881, and the annexation of Southern Dobruja in 1913.

The term came into use after World War I, when the Old Kingdom became Greater Romania, after including Transylvania, Banat, Bessarabia, and Bukovina. The term now has mainly a historical relevance and is otherwise used as a common term for all regions in Romania included in both the Old Kingdom and the present borders (Wallachia, Moldavia, and Northern Dobruja).

== Gallery ==
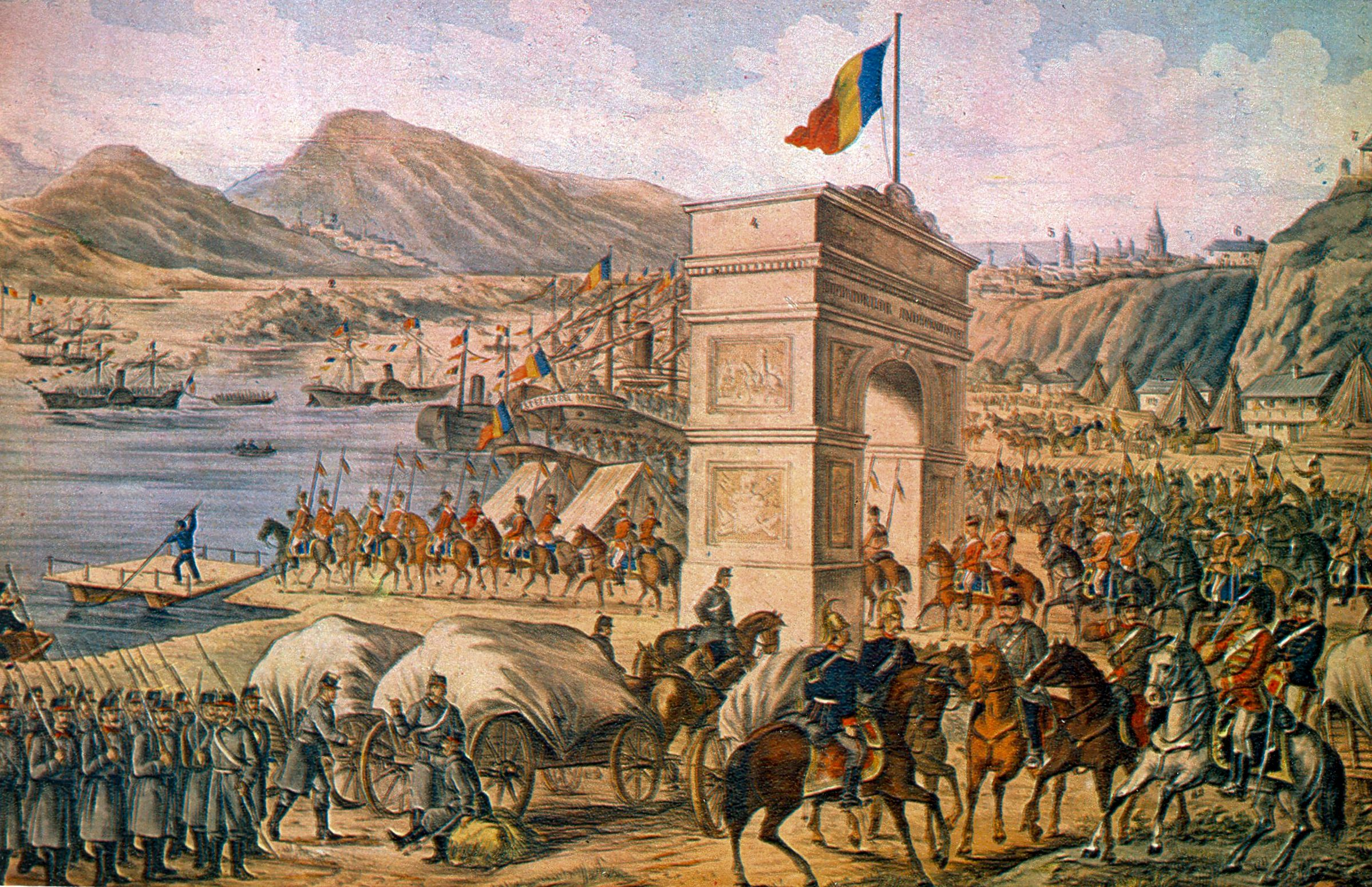
The Romanian Army crossing the Danube during the Romanian War of Independence (1878)

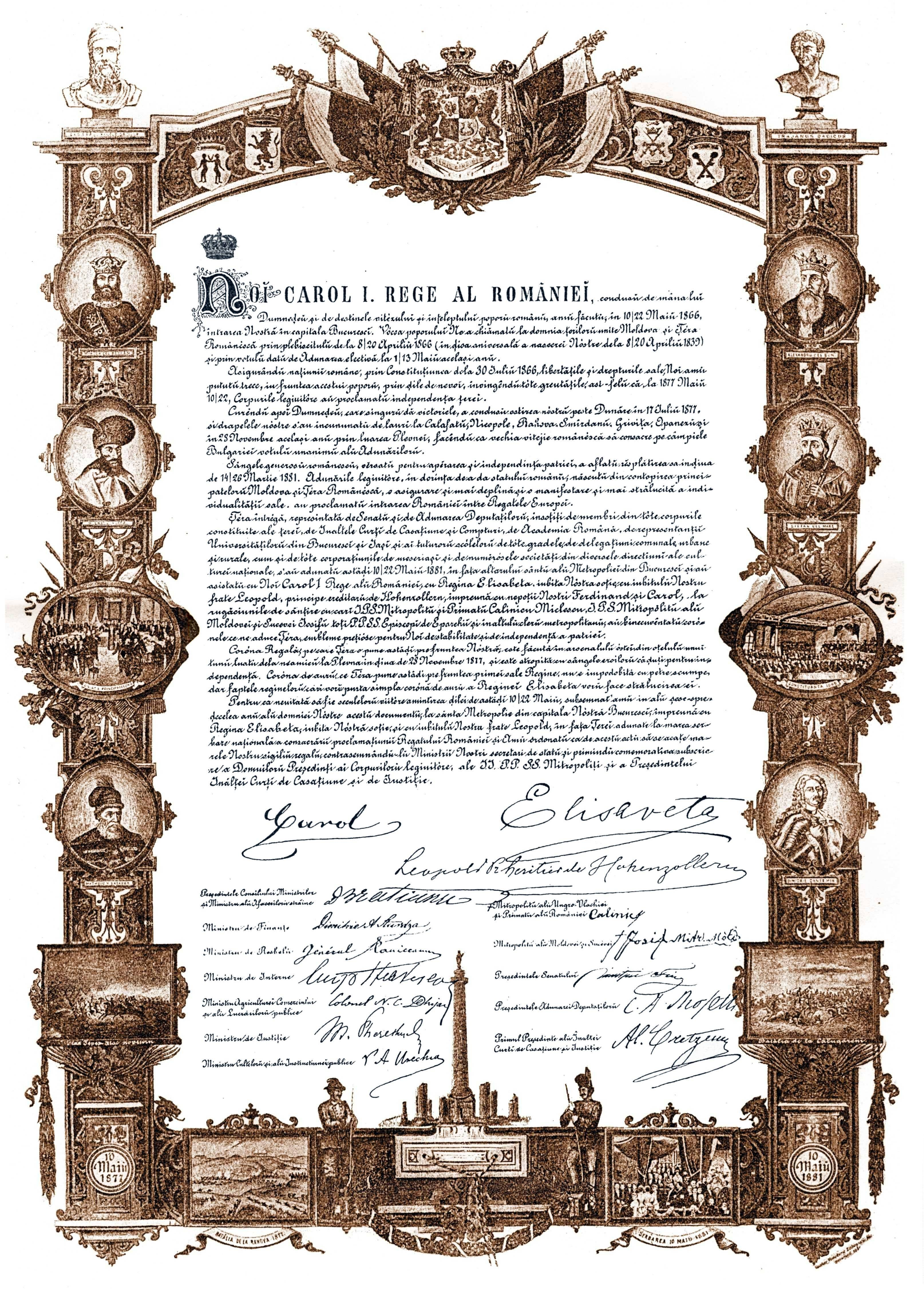
Romania's Proclamation Act of Kingdom

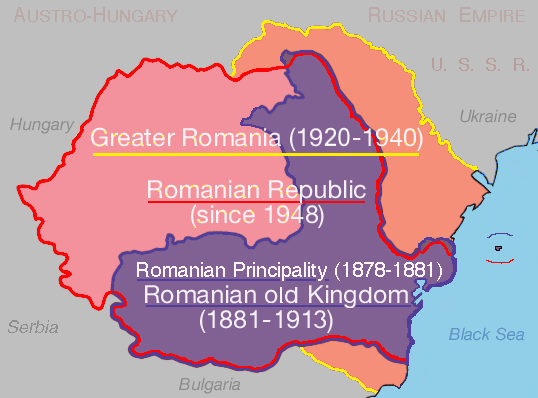
Change in the borders of Romania since 1881 (the Old Kingdom is marked in purple)

The Romanian coat of arms (1881–1921)

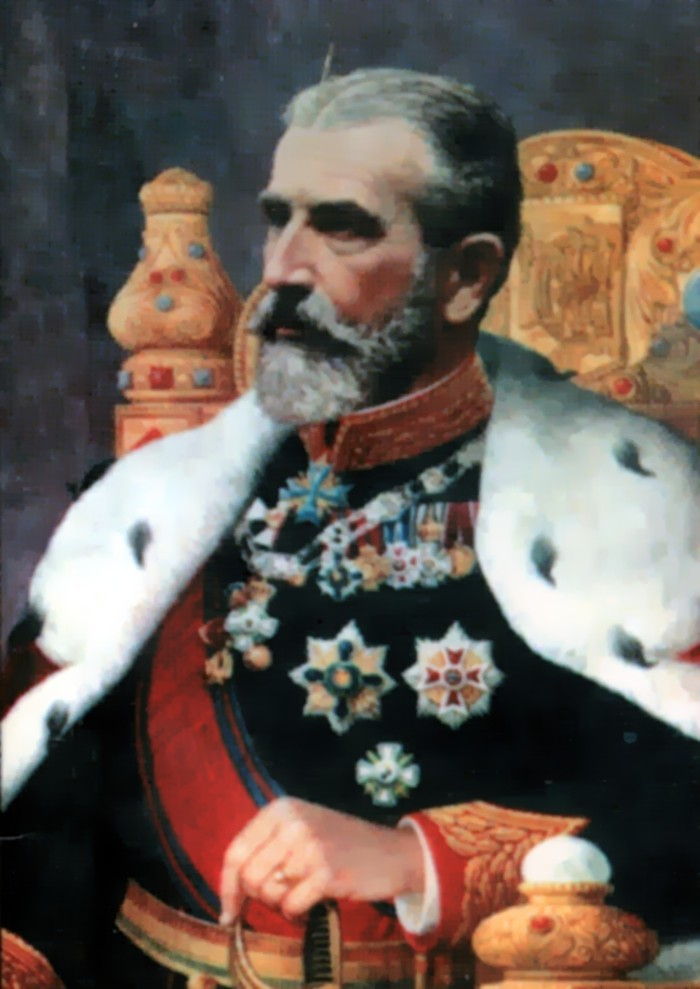
King Carol I (ruled 1866–1914)

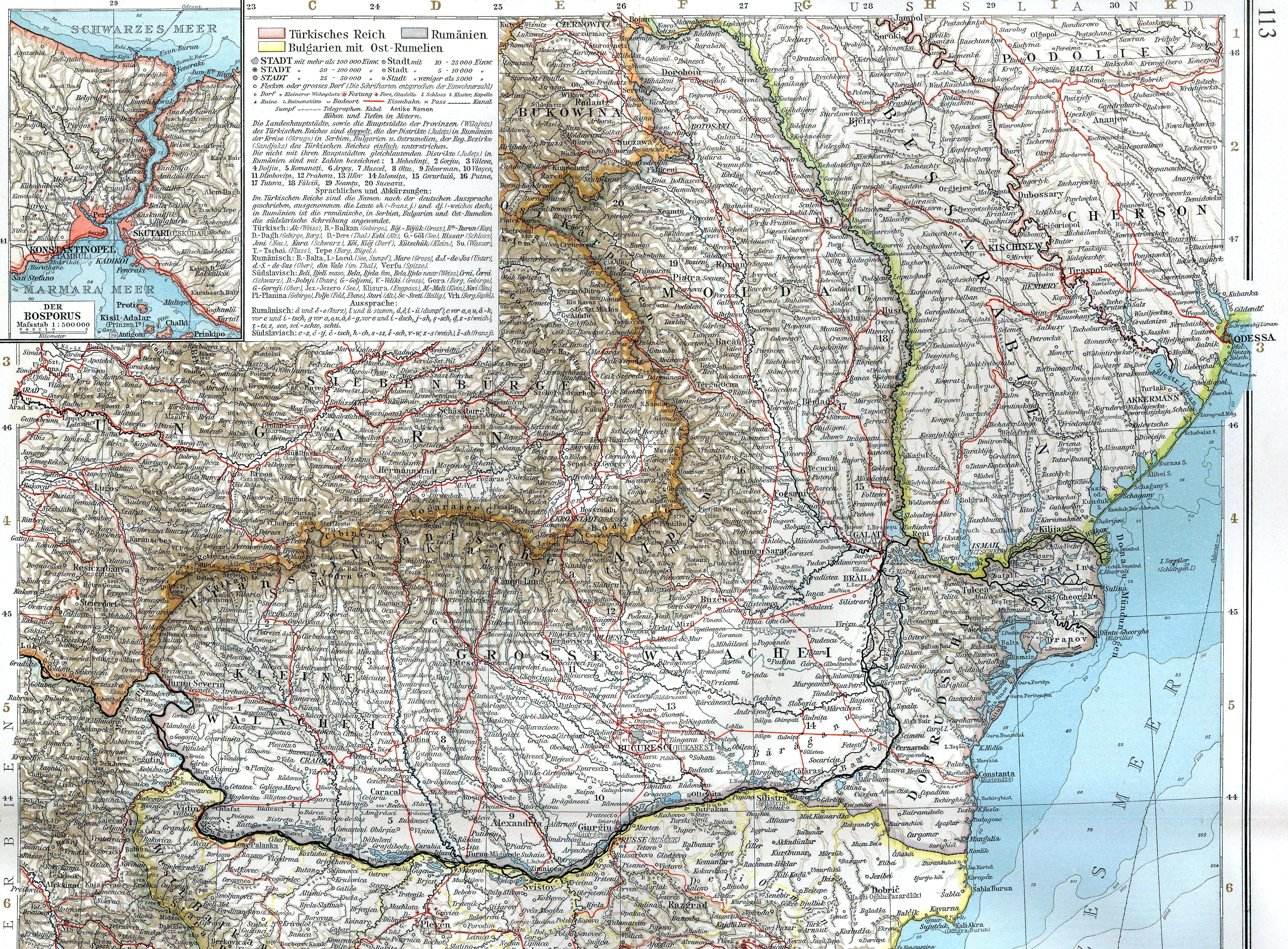
1901 German map of the Old Kingdom

The Romanian Old Kingdom in Europe (1914)

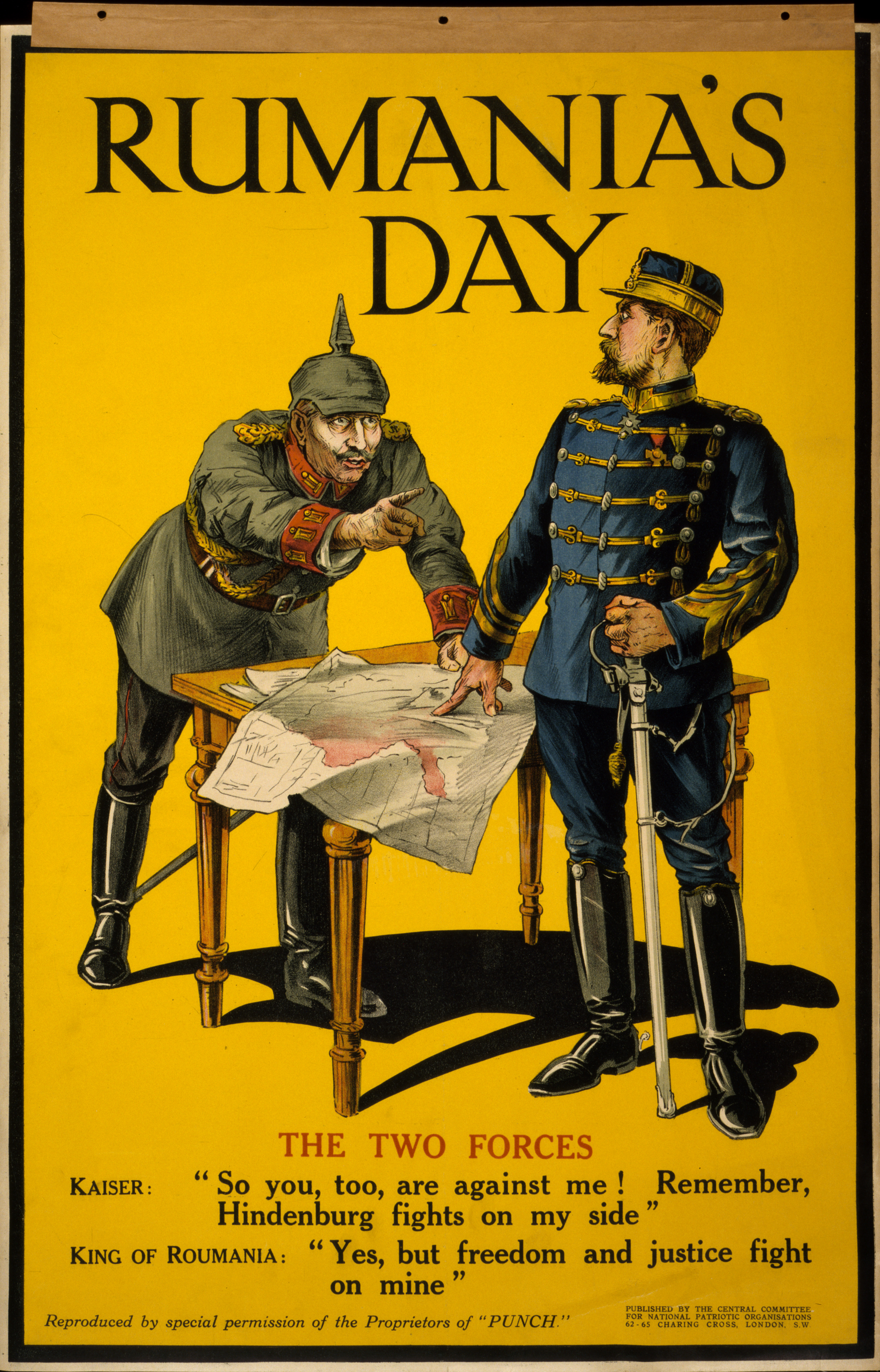
British poster congratulating Romania's entry in World War I on behalf of the Entente

== See also ==
- Kingdom of Romania
- Regat Germans
