= Regat Germans =

German ethnic group

German: Regatsdeutsche

- Top: Flag of the Kingdom of Romania; Bottom: The coat of arms of the Kingdom of Romania

Regions with significant populations
- Wallachia (Muntenia and Oltenia) and Western Moldavia

Languages
- German, Romanian

Religion
- Roman Catholicism and Lutheranism

Related ethnic groups
- Germans and Austrians
- Lived in Wallachia and Moldavia between the late 19th century and mid 20th century (and, in very smaller numbers, to the present day as well)

Regat Germans or Old Kingdom Germans (German: Regatsdeutsche or Altreichsdeutsche/Altreich-Deutsche) are an ethnic German group of the eastern and southern parts of Romania. The Regat is a Romanian-language term ascribed for the initial territorial extent of the Kingdom of Romania before World War I, roughly the regions of the current state of Romania to the south and east of Transylvania.

Consequently, this territory includes Western Moldavia, Northern Dobruja, Muntenia, Oltenia, and the Hertsa region (now in Chernivtsi Oblast, southwestern Ukraine). Most of the Regat German population was re-settled in the mid 20th century during World War II through the Heim ins Reich national socialist population transfer policy. Nowadays, the remaining Regat Germans, as all other German groups in Romania, are represented in local and central politics by the Democratic Forum of Germans in Romania (FDGR/DFDR). The Regat Germans are part of the Romanian Germans.

== Population transfers to Nazi Germany ==
As part of the Nazi-Soviet population transfers and the Heim ins Reich ("Home into the Empire") population transfer policy, Nazi Germany called ethnic Germans abroad to settle in the former Polish territories. Consequently, 77,000 Regat Germans were resettled in those regions in 1940.

Ethnic Germans from Romania resettled by Nazi Germany between 1939 and 1944

To Polish areas annexed by Nazi Germany	To General Government/Poland	To Oder–Neisse line region	To Austria	Total
128,000	12,000	52,000	20,000	212,000

Settlement/resettlement figures on 1 June 1944
Territory of origin	Total	Re-settled in annexed eastern territories
Bessarabia	93,342	89,201
Northern Bukovina	43,670	24,203
Southern Bukovina	52,149	40,804
Dobruja	15,454	11,812
Romania, Regat	10,115	1,129

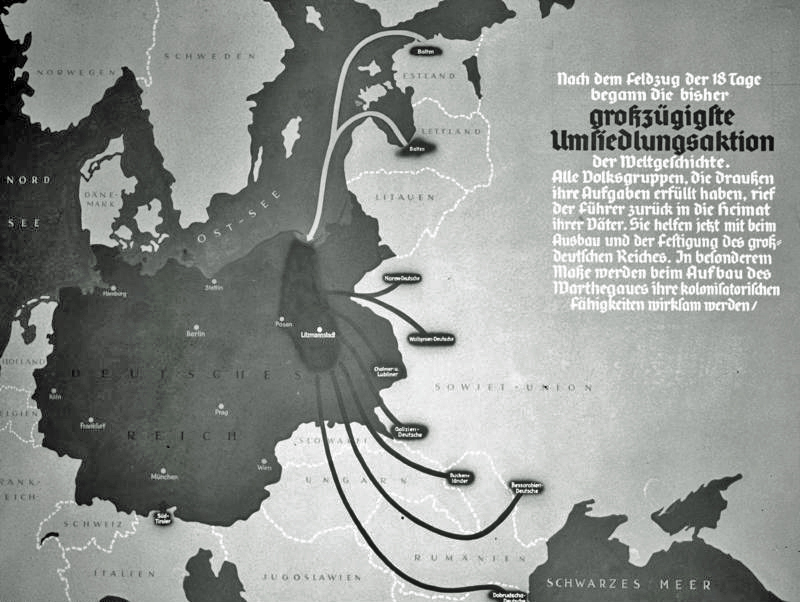
German-language map depicting the transfers of Volksdeutsche during the Heim ins Reich re-settlement.

== See also ==
- Dobrujan Germans
