= Our Lady Queen Cathedral in Iași =

Coordinates: 47.1604°N 27.5829°E

- Catedrala Sfânta Fecioară Maria, Regină din Iași
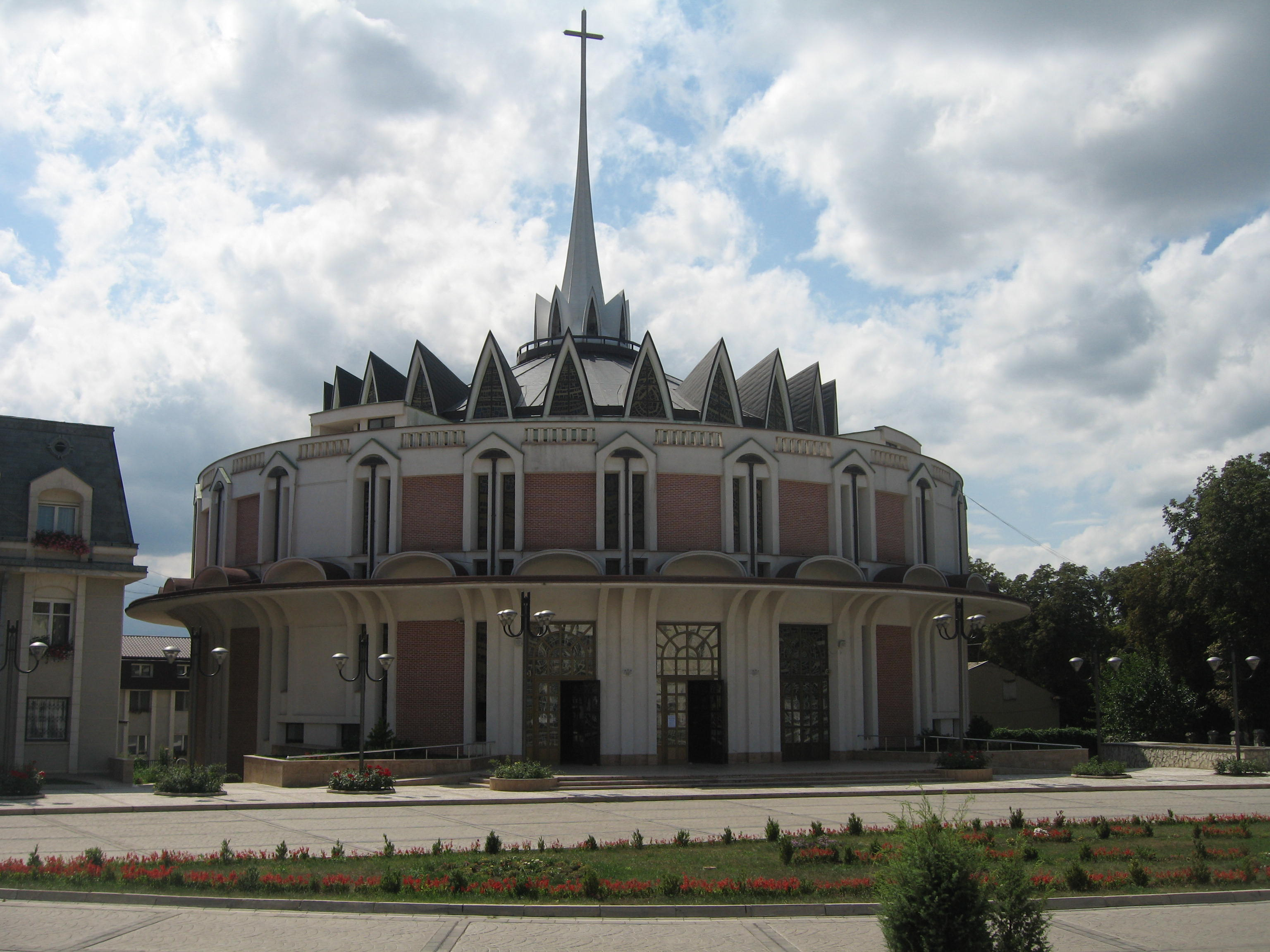
- Our Lady Queen Cathedral in Iași
- Location: Iași
- Country: Romania
- Denomination: Roman Catholic Church

Architecture
- Groundbreaking: 1992
- Completed: 2005

Specifications
- Height: 36 m (118 ft 1 in)

Administration
- Diocese: Roman Catholic Diocese of Iași

The Our Lady Queen Cathedral in Iași (Romanian: Catedrala Sfânta Fecioară Maria, Regină din Iași) is the cathedral church of the Roman Catholic Diocese of Iași, located in the city of Iași, in northeastern part of Romania.

The new cathedral was built due to the insufficient capacity of the old cathedral of St. Mary. Until 1989, this objective could not be achieved because of the opposition of the communist regime. On 15 August 1990, the first stone of the new sanctuary was laid by Bishop Peter Gherghel, but the prefecture of Iași ordered after a few months the suspension of work, arguing that the church was too close to the Via Mare Stefan, affecting the visibility of existing buildings in same area. The diocese then sought a new location for the cathedral. The new project was designed by architect George Heres.

Work began in August 1992, and the basement of the building was already fit for use for worship by October 1993. The first Mass was held in the basement on Christmas Day in 1993. The cathedral was completed in June 1998. In the following years work was undertaken to reinforce the roof and finish the exterior and interior decoration. The solemn dedication of the altar and the consecration of the Cathedral of Our Lady was held on 10 November 2005, with a Mass concelebrated by 23 bishops and with the presence of more than 200 priests of the diocese and more than 3,500 faithful.

On 1 June 2019, Pope Francis delivered a short Mass at the Our Lady Queen of Iași Cathedral, during his pastoral visit in Romania.

== See also ==
- Roman Catholicism in Romania
- Church of Our Lady (disambiguation)

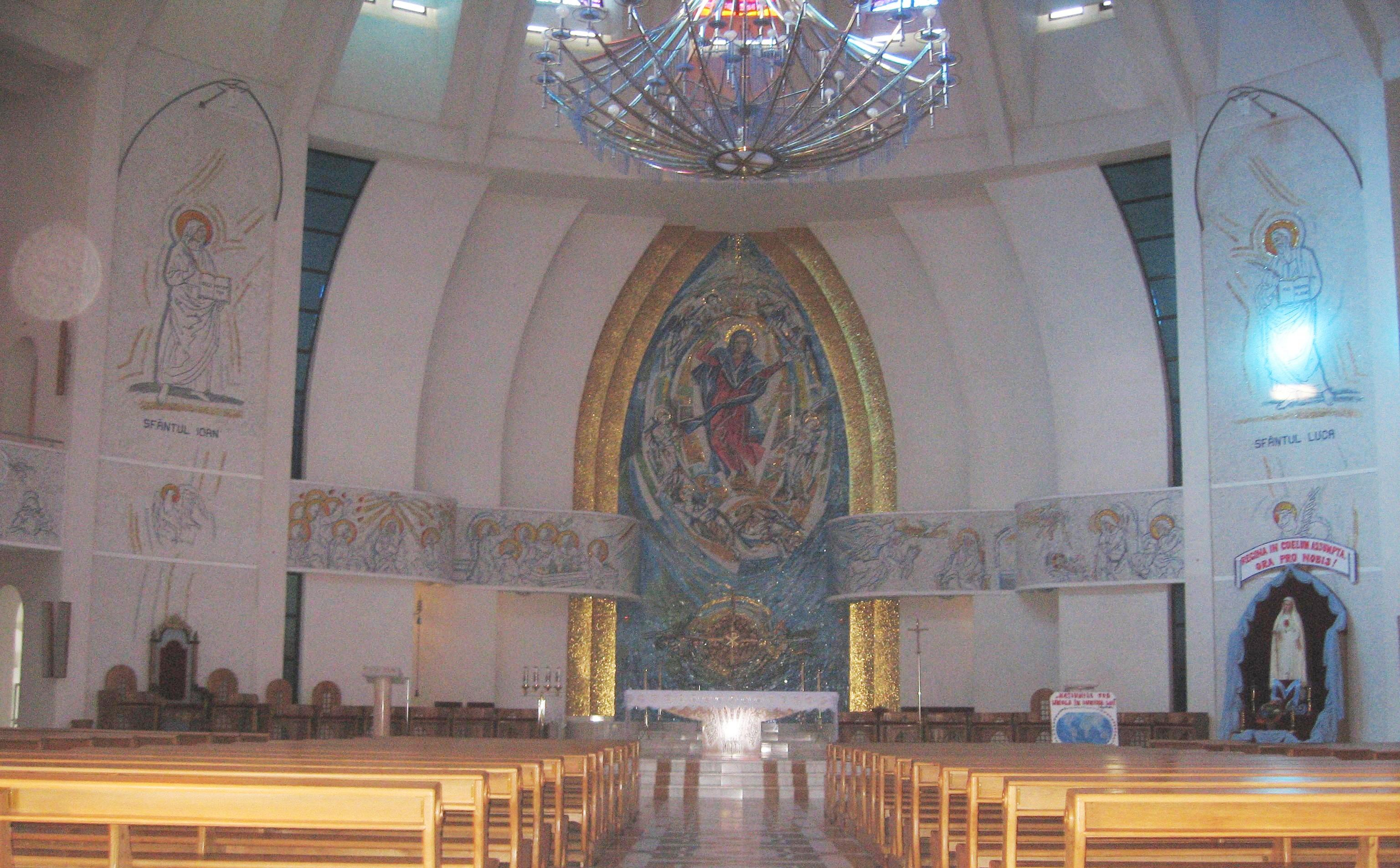
Internal View
