= Holy See–Romania relations =

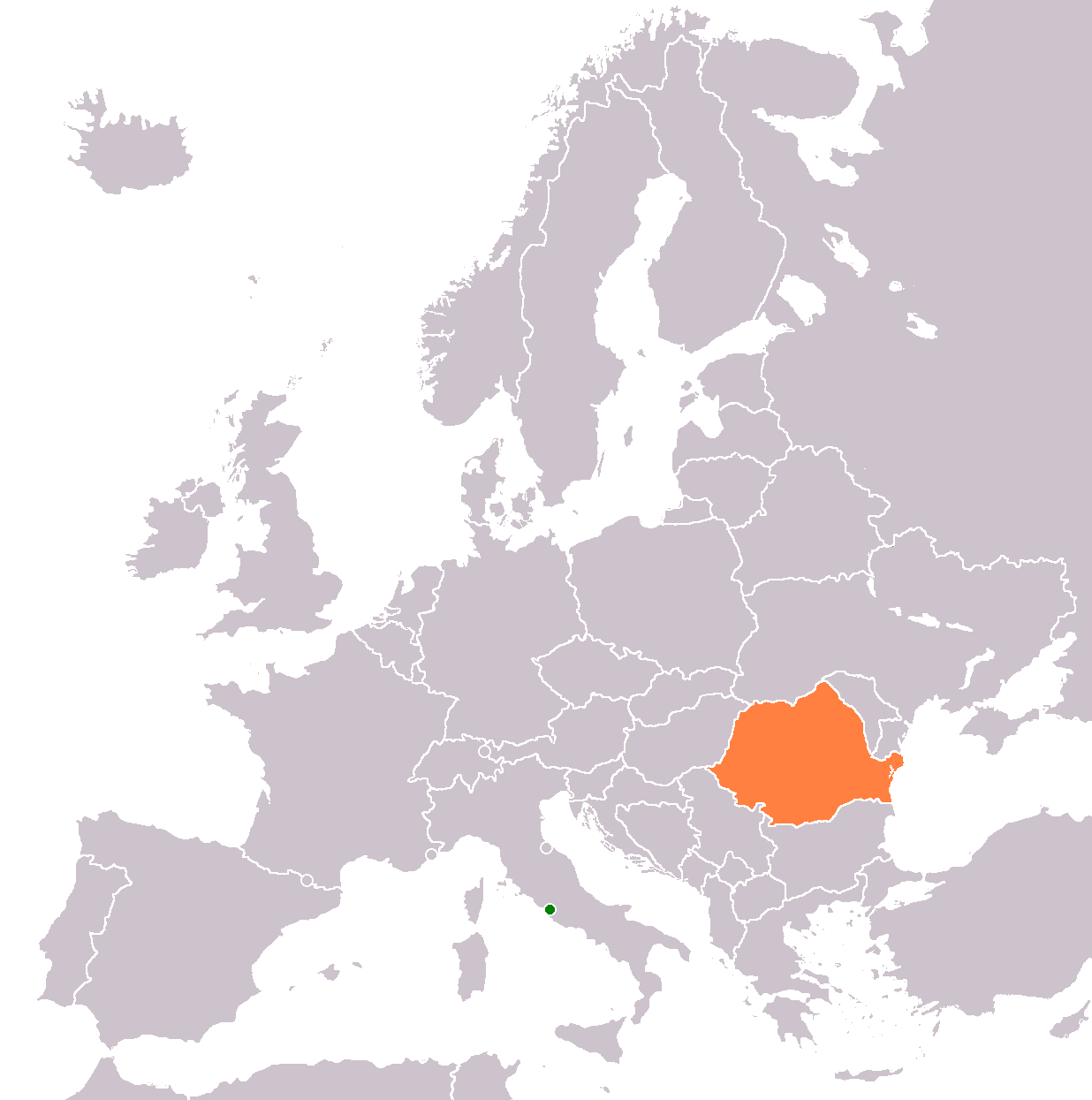
- Holy See: Romania

Holy See–Romania relations are foreign relations between the Holy See and Romania. Both countries established diplomatic relations in 1920. The Holy See has an embassy in Bucharest. Romania has an embassy to the Vatican.

== History ==
On 28 April 1969, Iuliu Hossu, who was the Bishop of Cluj-Gherla, became the first Romanian cardinal, when Pope Paul VI elevated him to the rank in pectore, meaning in secret. His rank of cardinal was announced in 1973, after Hossu's death.

From 7 to 9 May 1999, Pope John Paul II made an official visit to Romania. It was the first papal trip to a predominantly Orthodox country in more than 1,000 years. He attended an Orthodox liturgy on May 9, 1999, marking the first time a pope has ever attended an Orthodox service.

In 2002, there were 1,028,401 Catholics in Romania, representing 4.7% of the country's population.

Pope Francis visited Romania from 31 May to 2 June 2019. He was welcomed at Bucharest Henri Coandă International Airport by president Klaus Iohannis, first lady Carmen Iohannis (who is a Catholic), and the Romanian bishops.

== Resident diplomatic missions ==
- Holy See has an Apostolic Nunciature in Bucharest.
- Romania has an embassy to the Holy See based in Rome.

== See also ==
- Catholic Church in Romania
- Foreign relations of Romania
- Foreign relations of the Holy See
