= Caesaropolis =

Former Byzantine city on the coast of eastern Macedonia

Caesaropolis (Greek: Καισαρόπολις, Καισαρούπολις) was a Byzantine city on the coast of eastern Macedonia. It was founded in 836 by the Caesar Alexios Mosele to consolidate Byzantine control over the Slavic tribes of the area.

It is mentioned as an episcopal see in Heinrich Gelzer's Nova Tactica (1717) and in Parthey's Notitiae episcopatuum, III (c. 1170–1179) and X (12th or 13th century), as a suffragan of Philippi in Macedonia. Le Quien (II, 65) speaks of the see, but mentions no bishop. Manuscript notes give the names of two titulars: Meletius, who was alive in April 1329, and Gabriel, in November 1378.

In 1951 Bishop Fulton J. Sheen was named Titular Bishop of Caesaropolis by Pope Pius XII.

No longer a residential bishopric, Caesaropolis is today listed by the Catholic Church as a titular see.
