= Roman Catholic Diocese of Iași =

Latin Catholic ecclesiastical jurisdiction in Romania

Coordinates: 47.1604°N 27.5832°E

Diocese of Iaşi Dioecesis Iasensis Episcopia de Iaşi

Catholic
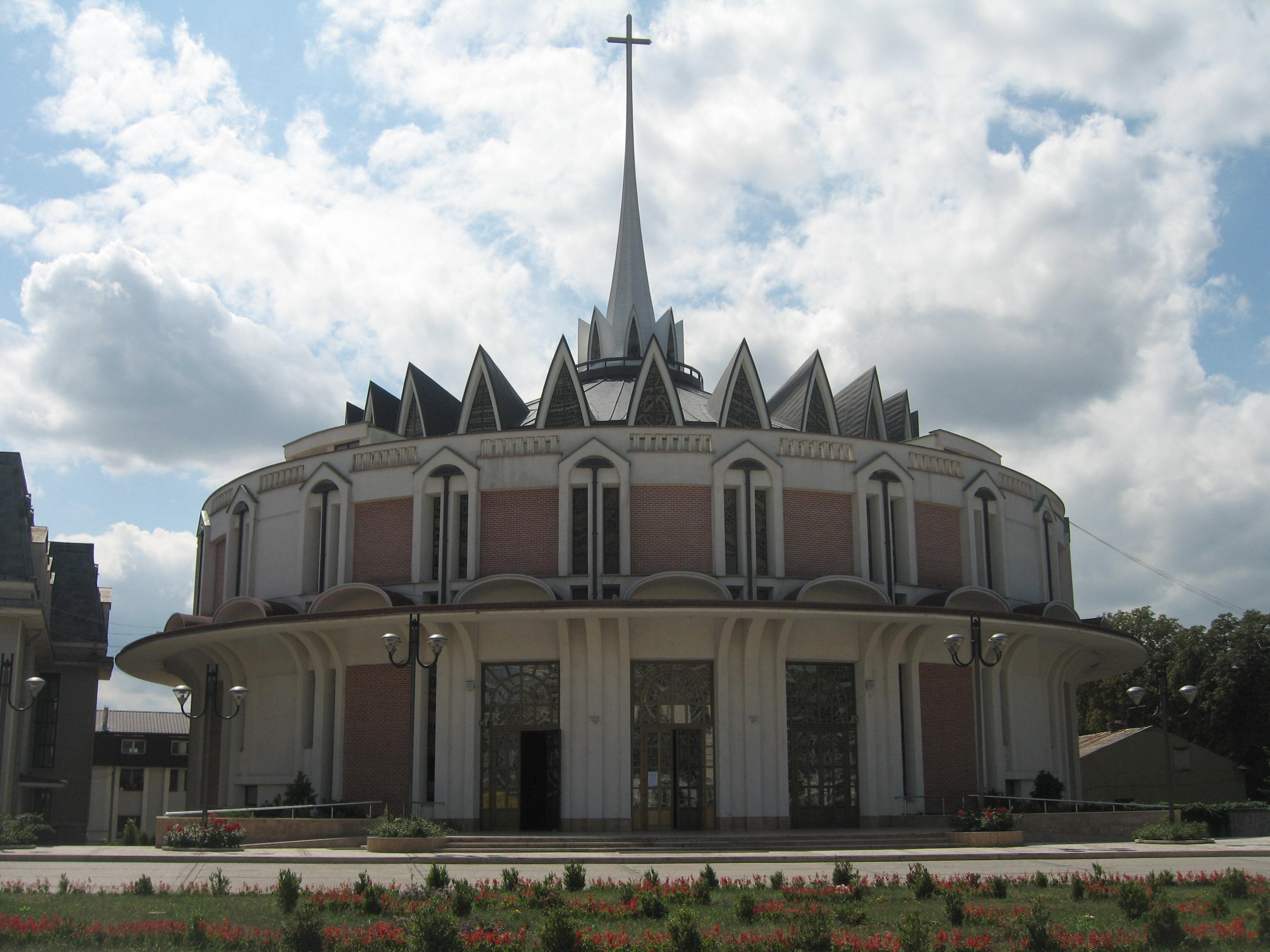
- Our Lady Queen of Iași Cathedral

Location
- Country: Romania
- Ecclesiastical province: Bucharest

Statistics
- Area: 46,378 km^{2} (17,907 sq mi)
- Population: Total; Catholics: (as of 2013); 4,272,000; 234,211 (5.5%)

Information
- Denomination: Catholic Church
- Sui iuris church: Latin Church
- Rite: Roman Rite
- Established: 27 June 1884
- Cathedral: Our Lady Queen of Iași Cathedral, Iaşi

Current leadership
- Pope: Leo XIV
- Bishop: Iosif Păuleț
- Metropolitan Archbishop: Aurel Perca
- Auxiliary Bishops: Petru Sescu
- Vicar General: Petru Sescu

Map
- Administrative map of the Roman Catholic Church in Romania

Website
- Website of the Diocese

The Diocese of Iași (or Latin: Dioecesis Iassiensis, Romanian: Episcopia Romano-Catolică de Iași, Hungarian: Jászvásári Egyházmegye, Polish: Diecezja Jassy) is a Latin Church ecclesiastical territory or diocese of the Catholic Church in Romanian Western Moldavia. It is a suffragan diocese in the ecclesiastical province of the metropolitan Archdiocese of Bucharest. Its episcopal see is Iași.

Its bishop has been Iosif Păuleț since 2019. Between 1990 and 2019 its bishop was Petru Gherghel, previously Apostolic Administrator since 1978. Auxiliary Bishop since 1999 has been Aurel Percă, Titular Bishop of Mauriana, appointed Archbishop of Bucharest in 2019.

== History ==
It was established in 1818 as the Apostolic Vicariate of Moldavia (a pre-diocesan missionary jurisdiction; exempt, i.e. directly subject to the Holy See, not part of an ecclesiastical province, but entitled to a titular bishop), on territory split off from the suppressed Diocese of Bacău, which had originally been set up at Siret by Pope Urban V in 1370, due to work done by Franciscans and Dominicans; its seat was transferred to Bacău at the beginning of the 15th century. Abandoned in 1497 due to Muslim persecutions, the See of Bacău was re-established in 1611, and had a succession of twenty prelates until 1789, when it was suppressed. The Catholics of Moldavia were then placed under the spiritual direction of Apostolic prefects, generally chosen from the Conventuals in charge of the mission.

The Apostolic Vicariate of Moldavia was promoted on 27 June 1884 by Pope Leo XIII to Diocese of Iaşi (Jászvásár in Hungarian) covering Romanian Moldavia, with Iaşi as residence.

In 1921 it gained territory from the Diocese of Tiraspol. On 5 June 1930 it gained the territory of the former Duchy of Bukovina from the Ukrainian Latin Metropolitan Archdiocese of Lviv.

On 28 October 1993, it lost territory to establish the Apostolic Administration of Moldova (now the diocese of Chișinău).

== Special churches ==
Its cathedral is the Our Lady Queen of Iași Cathedral, in Iaşi. The former cathedral, Assumption of Mary Church, is also located in the city.

Other former cathedrals are the Biserica de vizitarea Maicii Domnului, in Bacău, and the ruined Biserica de Maicii Domnului, in Baia.

A minor basilica is the Bazilica Minora Sanctuarul de la Cacica, in Cacica.

== Extent and statistics ==
As of 2014, its pastorally served 232,132 Catholics (5.3% of 4,359,762 total) on 46,378 km^{2} in 149 parishes, 420 priests (297 diocesan, 123 religious) with 704 lay religious (282 brothers, 422 sisters) and 125 seminarians.

The diocese covers the Romanian region of Moldavia—the counties of Suceava, Botoșani, Neamț, Iași, Bacău, Vaslui, Vrancea and Galați.

5.2% of the inhabitants are Catholic, with concentrations around Bacău and Roman. Its adherents are predominantly ethnic Romanians, with small Csángós (old Hungarian dialect) and Polish communities.

== Episcopal ordinaries ==
Apostolic Vicars of Moldavia

all missionary members of the Latin congregation of Conventual Friars Minor, O.F.M. Conv.

- Giovanni Filippo Paroni (1818.06.26 – 1825)
- Bonaventura Zabberoni (1825.07.19 – 1826.07.30), Titular Bishop of Helenopolis (1825.07.19 – death 1826.07.30)
- Aloisio Landi (? – death 1829.01.22)
  - Apostolic Administrator Jose Carlos Magni (1832–1838)
- Paolo Sardi (1843.04.07 – death 1848.11.09), Titular Bishop of Vera (1843.04.07 – 1848.11.09)
- Antonio de Stefano (1849.08.28 – death 1859.11.27), Titular Bishop of Benda (1849.08.28 – 1893.11.01)
- Giuseppe Salandari (1864.04.22 – death 1873.12.29)
- Antonio Maria Grasselli (1874.04.14 – 1874.12.22), Titular Bishop of Trapezopolis (1874.04.14 – 1875.01.08); later Apostolic Vicar of Constantinople (Turkey) (1874.12.22 – 1880.01.23), Titular Archbishop of Colossæ (1875.01.08 – 1899.06.19), Archbishop-Bishop of Viterbo e Tuscanella (Italy) (1899.06.19 – 1911), Archbishop-Bishop of Viterbo e Tuscania (Lazio, central Italy) (1911–1913.12.30), Titular Archbishop of Larissa, (1913.12.30 – 1919.02.01)
- Ludovico Marangoni (1874.12.22 – 1877.09.21), Titular Bishop of Gortyna (1874.12.31 – 1877.09.21); previously Minister General (General Superior) of the Order of Friars Minor Conventual (Conventual Franciscans) (1864–1872); later Bishop of Chioggia (Italy) (1877.09.21 – 1908.11.21)
- Fidelis Dehm (1877.12.31 – death 1880)

Bishops of Iaşi (Jászvásár)

- Nicolae Iosif Camilli (1884.06.27 – 1894.05.06 see below), previously Titular Bishop of Mosynopolis (1881.09.16 – 1884.06.27); later Titular Bishop of Gadaræ (1896.02.25 – 1901.03.27), Titular Archbishop of Constantia antea Tomi (1901.03.27 – 1904.08.30)
- Dominique Jacquet (1895.01.08 – 1904.02.25), also Metropolitan Archbishop of București (Bucharest, Romania) (1895–1895); later
- Nicolae Iosif Camilli (see above 1904.08.30 – 1916.01.17), now styled Archbishop-Bishop of Iaşi (Romania) (1904.08.30 – 1916.01.17)
- Alexandru Theodor Cisar (1920.04.22 – 1924.12.12), later Metropolitan Archbishop of București (Romania) (1924.12.12 – death 1954.01.07)
- Mihai Robu (1925.05.07 – death 1944.09.27)
- Apostolic Administrator Marcu Glaser (1944.10.18 – 1947.10.30), Titular Bishop of Cæsaropolis (1943.06.10 – 1950.05.25); afterward staying in the diocese as Auxiliary Bishop (1947.10.30 – 1950.05.25)
- Blessed Bishop Anton Durcovici (1947.10.30 – 1951.12.10), also Apostolic Administrator of București (Bucharest, Romania) (1948–1949).
- Petru Gherghel (1990.03.14 – present)

== Sources and external links ==
- GigaCatholic with incumbent biography links
- (in Romanian) Official site of the diocese
- PROFILE, newadvent.org. Accessed 23 February 2024.
