= Roman Catholic Theological Institute of Iași =

Sf. Iosif Roman Catholic Theological Institute
- Type: Private
- Established: 1886
- Affiliations: Catholic
- Rector: Benone Farcaș
- Academic staff: 25
- Students: 130
- Location: Iaşi, Romania
- Website: http://www.itrc.ro/

The Sf. Iosif Roman Catholic Theological Institute is a private university, with a Catholic character and liturgical tradition, in Iaşi, Romania, founded in 1886.

== Structure ==
- Faculty of Catholic Theology
