= Csángó Land =

Ethnographic region of Romania

Csángó Land Csángóföld (Hungarian) Țara Ceangăilor (Romanian)
- Ethnographic area in Romania
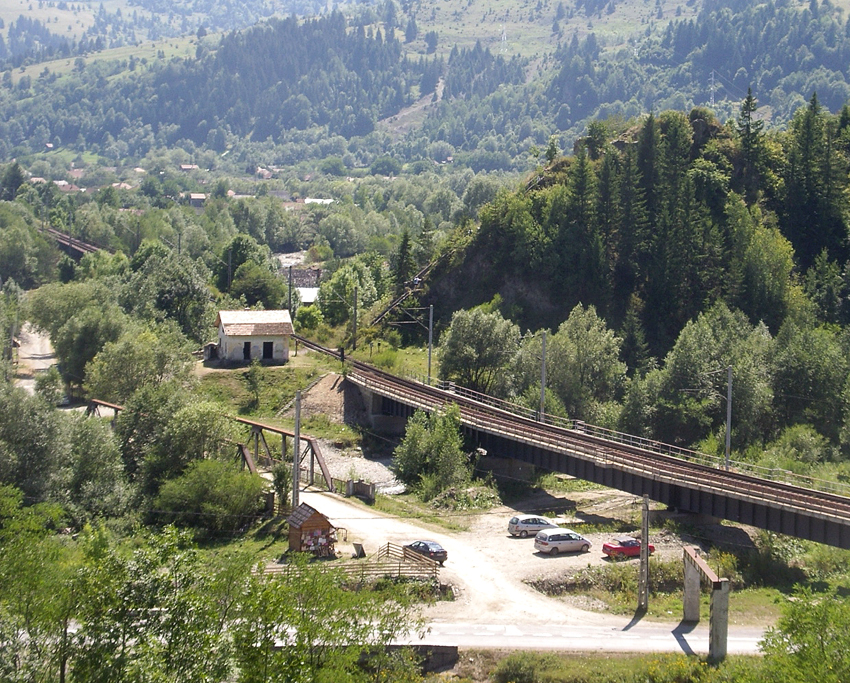
- The Ghimeș-Palanca Pass

- Flag Coat of arms

- Map of the areas where Csángós are present, whether as a minority or a majority. Black: Csángós of Western Moldavia. Green: Csángós around the Ghimeș-Palanca Pass. Red: Csángós of the Seven Villages. The Csángós of Northern Dobruja are not shown in this map.
- Country: Romania
- Time zone: UTC+2 (EET)
  - Summer (DST): UTC+3 (EEST)

Csángó Land (Hungarian: Csángóföld; Romanian: Țara Ceangăilor, Ținutul Ceangăiesc or Ceangăimea) is the name given to the region in Western Moldavia, in turn a region of Romania, where most of the Csángós, a small subgroup of the Hungarians, live. Csángó Land is located close to the Eastern Carpathian Mountains, in the valley of the Siret River, near the town of Roman and Bacău. It may also be defined as the part of Bacău County where ethnic Hungarians reside as a minority.

The Csángós, although mostly living in Moldavia, also live in Transylvania (part of Romania as well), precisely in two zones. These are the area around the Ghimeș-Palanca Pass and the so-called Seven Villages. Additionally, there is a Csángó village in Northern Dobruja, a region also in Romania, known as Oituz (in Constanța County). The Csángós speak a Hungarian dialect known as Csángó. The Council of Europe claimed the number of speakers of this dialect to be of 60,000 to 70,000 people in 2001. However, in the 2011 Romanian census, only 4,208 (0.68%) and 829 (0.13%) of the inhabitants of Bacău County declared themselves Hungarian and Csángó, respectively.

The Csángós live near a much larger subgroup of Hungarians, the Székelys, who also live in the eastern Carpathian Mountains, in Transylvania. They also have a region named after them, Székely Land, divided mostly between the Covasna, Harghita, and Mureș counties of Romania. The Székelys have strived for making Székely Land an autonomous region in Romania. This is not the case of the Csángós, who have not made any request for autonomy.

== See also ==
- Hungarians in Romania
- Magyar Autonomous Region
- Partium
