= Cleja =

- Commune
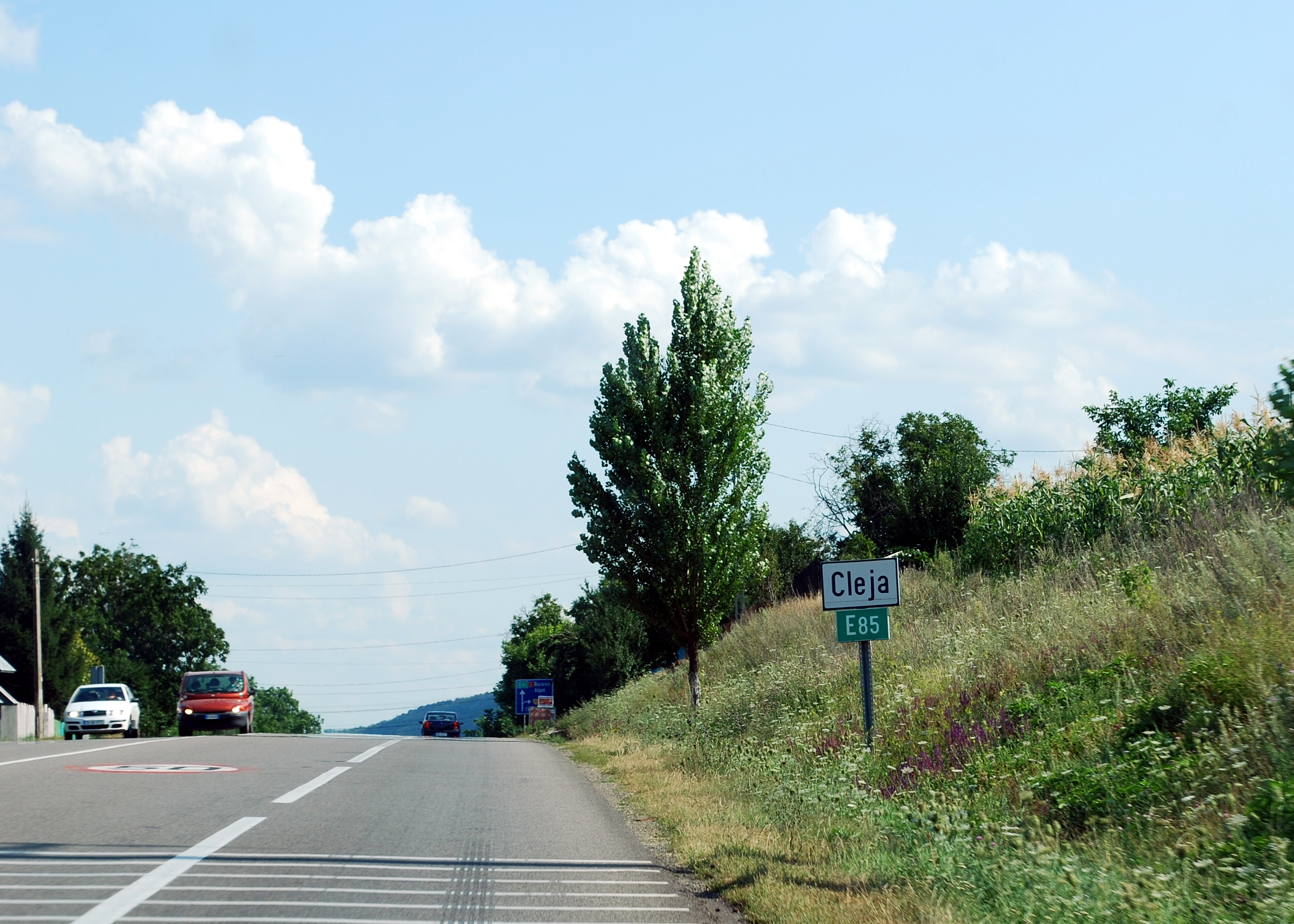
- DN2 entering the village of Cleja

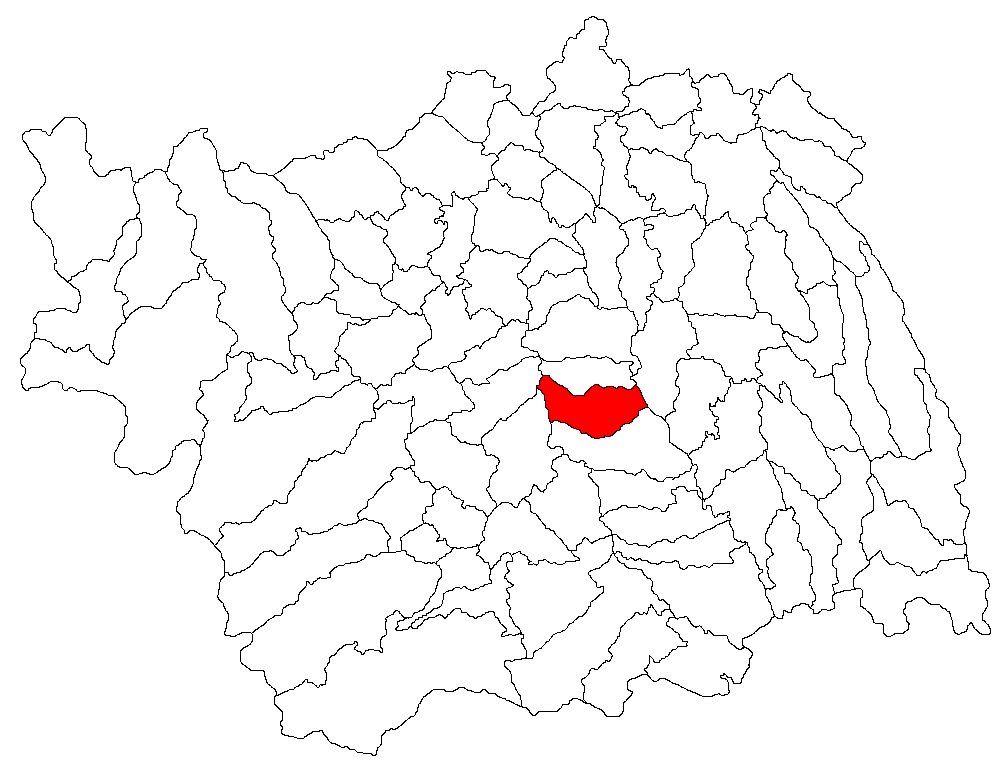
- Location in Bacău County

- Location in Romania
- Coordinates: 46°24′N 26°55′E
- Country: Romania
- County: Bacău

Government
  - Mayor (2020–2024): Petru Iștoc (PNL)
- Area: 54.71 km^{2} (21.12 sq mi)
- Elevation: 161 m (528 ft)
- Population (2021-12-01): 5,320
  - Density: 97.2/km^{2} (252/sq mi)
- Time zone: UTC+02:00 (EET)
  - Summer (DST): UTC+03:00 (EEST)
- Postal code: 607105
- Area code: +(40) 234
- Vehicle reg.: BC
- Website: primariacleja.ro

Cleja (Hungarian: Klézse) is a commune in Bacău County, Western Moldavia, Romania. It is composed of three villages: Cleja, Somușca (Somoska), and Valea Mică (Pokolpatak).

Historical population
Year	Pop.	±%
2002	6,864	—
2011	6,621	−3.5%
2021	5,320	−19.6%
Source: Census data

At the 2002 census, the commune had 6,864 residents; 97.8% were Roman Catholic, 1.6% Romanian Orthodox, and 0.2% Pentecostal. At the 2011 census, Cleja had a population of 6,621; of those, 92.09% were ethnic Romanians, 2.19% Csángós, and 2.16% Hungarians. By the 2021 census, the population had decreased to 5,320, of which 86.47% were Romanians and 6.2% Hungarians.
