= Oituz (disambiguation) =

Oituz is a commune in Bacău County, Romania.

Oituz may also refer to the following places in Romania:

- Lumina, Constanța, a village in the commune Lumina, Constanța County
- Oituz, a village in the commune Brețcu, Covasna County
- Oituz (river), a tributary of the Trotuș in Covasna and Bacău Counties
