= Siebendörfer =

Siebendörfer may refer to:

- The German name of Săcele, a city in Romania
- The German name of the Seven Villages, a historical region and former administrative district in Romania
