= Partium Christian University =

University in Western Romania

- Partiumi Keresztény Egyetem
- Other name: Universitatea Creștină Partium
- Established: 1995; 31 years ago
- Accreditation: Romanian accreditation agency ARACIS, 2008
- Religious affiliation: Christian
- Rector: József Pálfi
- Dean: Borbála Bökös
- Students: 1,000 in 2014
- Doctoral students: 0
- Location: Strada Primăriei, Nr. 36, Oradea, Bihor County, Romania; 47°03′25″N 21°55′20″E
- Campus: Urban
- Language: Hungarian
- Website: partium.ro/en

Partium Christian University (Hungarian: Partiumi Keresztény Egyetem; Romanian: Universitatea Creștină Partium) was founded in 1995 in Oradea, the capital and university city of the historical region of Partium, in Transylvania. Its location is a border city with about 185,000 inhabitants close to Hungary, in western Romania.

== History ==
The university was founded with the support of the Calvinist pastor László Tőkés, and emerged from the Calvinist Sulyok István Reformed College founded in 1990 following the 1989 anticommunist revolution in Romania. Gradually, the College grew into a university by 1995 and was fully accredited in 2008. Today it caters primarily for the Hungarian-speaking population of Western Romania, with around 100 Hungarian speaking faculty members and over 1,000 students. Reformist Christian values underpin the university, but practice is not required of students, and its teaching and mission is wide-ranging and also includes research and community outreach. It receives almost all its core funding from Hungary, and is therefore classed as a private university in Romania.

== Structure and organisation ==
The university is organized into two faculties: Letters and Arts, and Economic and Social Sciences. There are 14 small Departments including a Department of Teacher Training. Teaching is at undergraduate level across these areas, and Music is also taught. There are Masters degrees in European Social Politics, Translation, Multiculturalism, Art, Finance, and Entrepreneurship. Fees are low compared to surrounding private institutions and class size is small.

An evaluation of the university was conducted as part of a European University Association (EUA) 'Quality and Diversity of the Romanian Universities' study in 2014 when the university was quite young and had 1,000 students at Bachelor and Master level. It found that the 82% Hungarian foreign funding for the university gives it a unique status (p. 14), while the university still has to conform to Romanian accreditation processes. "PCU reports to three authorities – the Romanian ministry in charge of higher education, the Hungarian Parliament (through the Sapientia Foundation) and the Romanian accreditation agency ARACIS." This has meant bureaucratic structures were in place that could be streamlined: aside from the management there was a Founders’ Council, University Board and Senate.

Externally, The Sapientia Foundation approves the university strategy, before disbursing Hungarian funding on behalf of the Hungarian Government (p. 5). Teaching loads are quite high and students are expected to study full time (p. 13).
