= List of towns in Romania by ethnic Hungarian population =

This list contains Romanian urban localities (municipalities or towns) in which ethnic Hungarians make up over 5% of the total population, according to the 2021 census, ordered by their percentage of the local population. (Note that ethnic data were unavailable for a certain percentage of residents counted during that census, and these were excluded from the total when computing the percentages.) The Hungarians are an ethnic group which make up 6% of Romania's population, with nearly all living in Transylvania, where they make up 17.4% of the population.

Hungarians form at least 5% of the population in 73 of Transylvania's 143 towns, accounting for 94.4% of the region's 465,970 urban Hungarians. There are numerous rural localities (communes and villages) which also have Hungarian populations exceeding 5% of the total population, even though those are not listed here. Conversely, Hungarian communities of at least a thousand people, but under the 5% threshold, exist in Timișoara (8313), Bistrița (2898), Hunedoara (1777), Lugoj (1357), Sibiu (1206) and Petroșani (1147), as well as in Bucharest (2168).

In localities where Hungarians make up more than 20% of the population (including those with unknown ethnicity), the Hungarian language can be used when addressing local authorities, while state-funded education and bilingual signs are also provided. This arrangement applies in many communes, as well as in thirty-one cities and towns.

Absolute Hungarian majority; Hungarian language has a special status in local administration
20-50% Hungarians; Hungarian language has a special status in local administration
Under 20% Hungarians; Hungarian language without special status in local administration

At least 10,000 Hungarians
Between 5000 and 9999 Hungarians
Between 2500 and 4999 Hungarians
Under 2500 Hungarians

City	# Hungarians in 2021	% Hungarians in 2021	in 1966	in 1930	in 1910^{[a]}
Vlăhița, Harghita	6,088	98.9	98.5	98.1	100.0
Baraolt, Covasna	6,736	95.8	96.0	91.5	99.3
Odorheiu Secuiesc, Harghita	27,351	95.7	94.9	83.5	96.9
Cristuru Secuiesc, Harghita	7,673	94.8	96.7	86.9	96.9
Târgu Secuiesc, Covasna	13,771	92.5	95.1	92.7	98.5
Băile Tușnad, Harghita	1,142	90.7	90.9		99.5
Sovata, Mureș	8,035	88.5	92.9	83.6	98.7
Gheorgheni, Harghita	11,832	87.6	92.3	86.1	96.0
Miercurea Nirajului, Mureș	4,218	84.0	77.0	60.4	83.0
Valea lui Mihai, Bihor	7,098	82.8	82.5	65.7	99.6
Miercurea Ciuc, Harghita	24,873	81.5	92.2	85.9	97.9
Sângeorgiu de Pădure, Mureș	3,626	80.7	78.5	61.2	91.2
Sfântu Gheorghe, Covasna	34,678	78.1	86.0	74.4	96.6
Borsec, Harghita	1,667	72.7	86.4	77.9	91.4
Săcueni, Bihor	6,672	66.7	80.5	80.1	98.8
Covasna, Covasna	5,556	65.7	74.8	72.8	78.4
Livada, Satu Mare	3,175	59.8	68.1	63.2	96.9
Salonta, Bihor	8,387	58.0	72.9	80.2	95.3
Carei, Satu Mare	8,714	52.1	59.5	35.1	98.1
Cehu Silvaniei, Sălaj	2,920	48.7	50.1	51.1	64.9
Târgu Mureș, Mureș	40,604	41.8	69.6	57.2	86.8
Marghita, Bihor	4,726	38.7	57.3	50.8	82.2
Satu Mare, Satu Mare	28,152	36.3	49.5	41.4	91.4
Bălan, Harghita	1,623	33.2	53.7		95.8
Tășnad, Satu Mare	2,251	29.9	48.5	43.1	71.6
Reghin, Mureș	5,607	22.6	46.9	40.1	50.7
Huedin, Cluj	1,817	22.5	51.1	60.1	91.4
Pecica, Arad	2,341	22.0	49.8	50.7	55.5
Ulmeni, Maramureș	1,448	21.8	27.5	26.3	33.4
Luduș, Mureș	2,784	21.1	33.5	46.1	58.6
Oradea, Bihor	33,340	20.9	51.4	53.7	91.3
Chișineu-Criș, Arad	1,306	19.7	26.2	34.4	46.7
Toplița, Harghita	2,092	19.2	39.6	31.5	32.7
Sărmașu, Mureș	1,097	19.0	26.0	34.4	37.0
Șimleu Silvaniei, Sălaj	2,167	18.3	36.4	40.1	77.5
Săcele, Brașov	4,499	18.1	38.5	59.4	57.4
Ardud, Satu Mare	865	16.4	33.8	13.9	62.3
Rupea, Brașov	706	16.1	23.1	13.7	11.3
Sighișoara, Mureș	3,008	15.3	16.3	20.6	21.4
Gherla, Cluj	2,609	14.8	24.8	27.2	60.6
Aiud, Alba	2,766	14.6	25.4	37.2	51.0
Baia Sprie, Maramureș	1,672	14.2	28.8	35.1	62.8
Cluj-Napoca, Cluj	33,603	13.9	41.4	47.3	81.6
Zalău, Sălaj	6,108	13.5	44.5	52.6	74.0
Seini, Maramureș	1,000	13.2	25.6	25.0	46.3
Târnăveni, Mureș	2,393	13.1	22.1	41.7	51.6
Aleșd, Bihor	1,105	12.4	37.2	39.4	41.2
Târgu Lăpuș, Maramureș	1,064	10.8	15.2	15.2	26.7
Beclean, Bistrița-Năsăud	1,088	10.5	29.4	29.7	50.4
Deta, Timiș	498	10.3	25.4	20.1	18.5
Sighetu Marmației, Maramureș	2,771	10.2	25.5	19.9	76.7
Tăuții-Măgherăuș, Maramureș	732	10.0	20.1	24.8	29.8
Baia Mare, Maramureș	8,713	9.8	31.9	31.8	64.8
Dej, Cluj	2,520	9.0	28.5	31.6	57.5
Iernut, Mureș	667	8.9	23.1	27.2	30.8
Jibou, Sălaj	770	8.8	27.5	30.6	47.0
Gătaia, Timiș	405	8.5	18.8	18.3	27.0
Arad, Arad	10,071	8.0	24.9	35.6	62.9
Cavnic, Maramureș	304	8.0	21.3	33.2	53.0
Mediaș, Sibiu	2,514	7.6	15.7	23.1	17.4
Ocna Sibiului, Sibiu	227	7.6	13.1	16.6	21.9
Turda, Cluj	2,566	7.2	16.9	49.5	69.4
Jimbolia, Timiș	619	7.1	20.7	19.3	20.8
Ocna Mureș, Alba	772	6.7	16.4	29.5	40.9
Deva, Hunedoara	2,829	6.6	18.0	37.2	59.1
Dumbrăveni, Sibiu	355	6.6	12.3	23.8	40.8
Ungheni, Mureș	378	6.0	11.5	9.6	13.6
Sânnicolau Mare, Timiș	504	5.8	10.9	11.6	17.5
Câmpia Turzii, Cluj	972	5.6	15.1	35.5	44.7
Copșa Mică, Sibiu	220	5.6	18.9	45.9	48.7
Beiuș, Bihor	490	5.5	11.2	23.9	46.1
Brașov, Brașov	10,942	5.4	17.0	39.3	43.4
Lupeni, Hunedoara	809	5.0	19.5	35.5	41.9

By maternal language.
