= Lumina, Constanța =

Lumina
- Commune
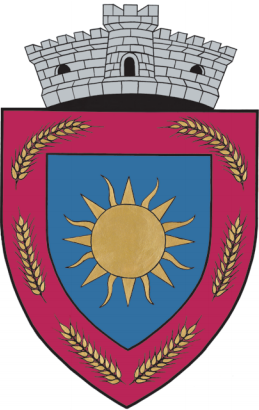
- Coat of arms

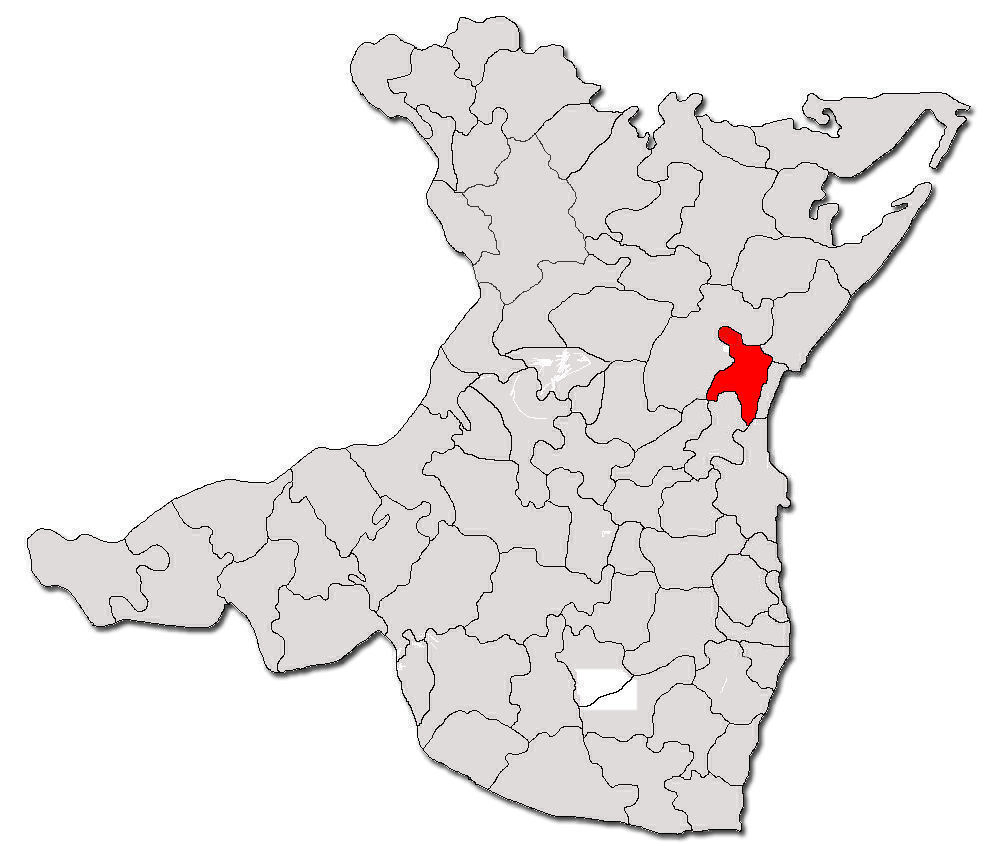
- Location in Constanța County

- Location in Romania
- Coordinates: 44°17′N 28°34′E
- Country: Romania
- County: Constanța
- Subdivisions: Lumina, Oituz, Sibioara

Government
  - Mayor (2025–present): Daniel-Emilian Mantea (PSD)
- Area: 48.75 km^{2} (18.82 sq mi)
- Population (2021-12-01): 10,770
  - Density: 220.9/km^{2} (572.2/sq mi)
- Time zone: UTC+02:00 (EET)
  - Summer (DST): UTC+03:00 (EEST)
- Vehicle reg.: CT
- Website: www.primaria-lumina.ro

Lumina (Romanian pronunciation: [luˈmina]; Romanian for "the light") is a commune in Constanța County, Northern Dobruja, Romania.

The commune includes three villages:

- Lumina (historical names: Valea Neagră (until 1965); Cogealia, Kogea-Ali (until 1929) - Turkish: Kocaali, German: Kodschalie)
- Oituz - established in 1926, named after Oituz (Bacău County)
- Sibioara (historical name: Cicrâcci, Turkish: Çıkrıkçı)

== Demographics ==
At the 2021 census Lumina had a population of 10,770 with a majority of Romanians (72.31%) and minorities of Tatars (2.35%), Roma (2.27%), Turks (0.24%), Lipovans (0.11%), Germans (0.05%), Bulgarians (0.03%), others (0.27%) and unknown (22.37%).

At the 2011 census, Lumina had 7,619 Romanians (93.82%), 104 Roma (1.28%), 95 Turks (1.17%), 282 Tatars (3.47%), 4 Aromanians (0.05%), 17 others (0.21%).

A large community of Csángó Hungarians lives in the village of Oituz.
