= Seven Villages =

Former administrative district and historical region in Romania

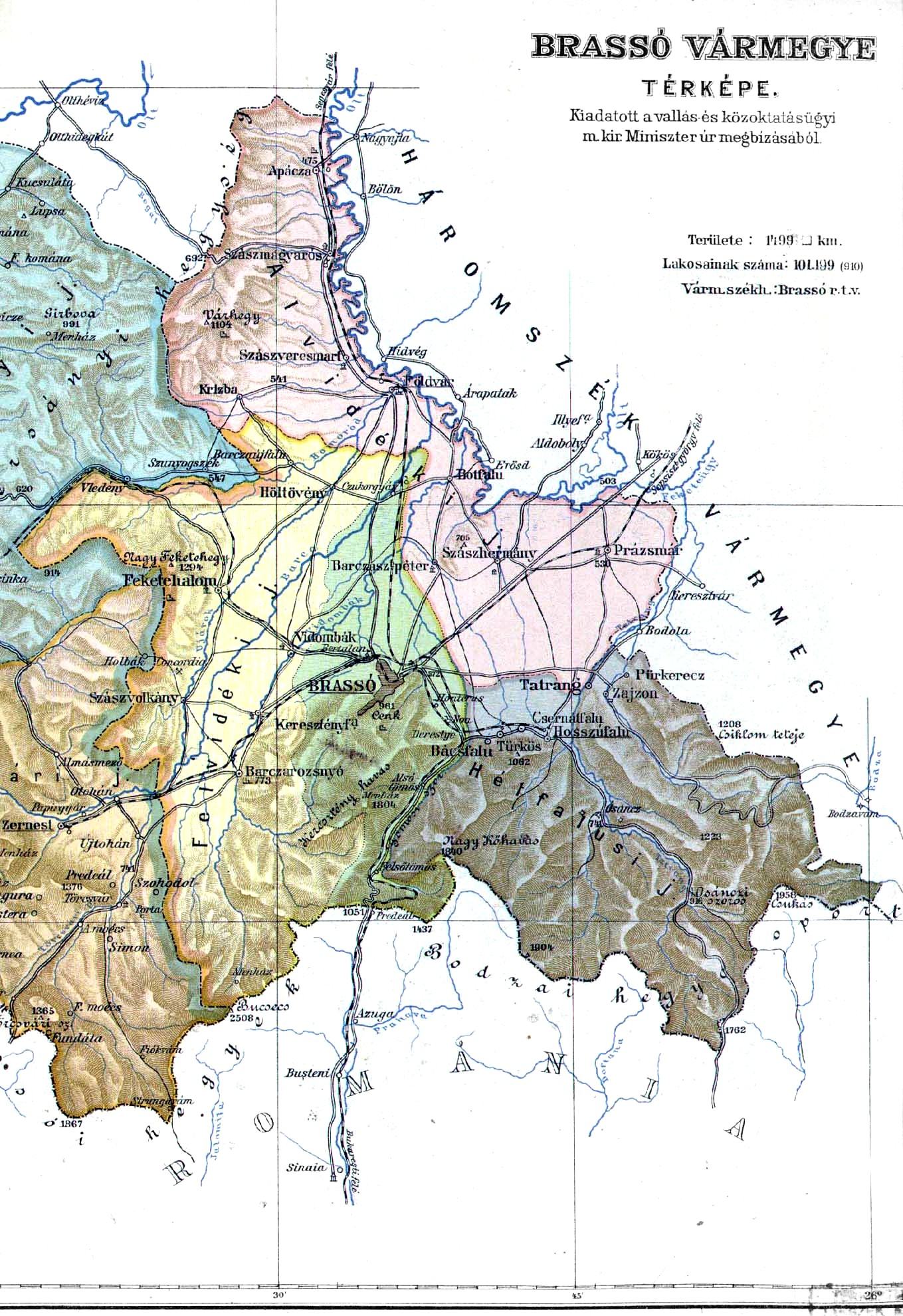
Seven Villages district (labeled Hétfalusi j.) on a 1910 map of Brassó County

The Seven Villages (Romanian: Șapte Sate; Hungarian: Hétfalu; German: Siebendörfer) was a district of Brassó County in the Kingdom of Hungary. Today, all seven villages are part of Romania. Four of them are now part of the city of Săcele (Baciu, Turcheș, Cernatu, and Satulung), while the other three belong to the commune of Tărlungeni (Tărlungeni, Zizin, and Purcăreni). The seat of the district was at Satulung (Hungarian: Hosszúfalu). The four settlements now in Săcele (Hungarian: Négyfalu, lit. "Four Villages") are first mentioned in a privilege letter of Louis I of Hungary from 1366.

During the 1930s, the local press published a number of articles detailing the complex but peaceful relations between the three ethnic groups that lived in the Seven Villages: Romanian Mocani shepherds and Hungarian Csángós and Székelys.
