= Catholic Church in Moldova =

The Catholic Church in Moldova is part of the worldwide Catholic Church, under the spiritual leadership of the Pope in Rome.

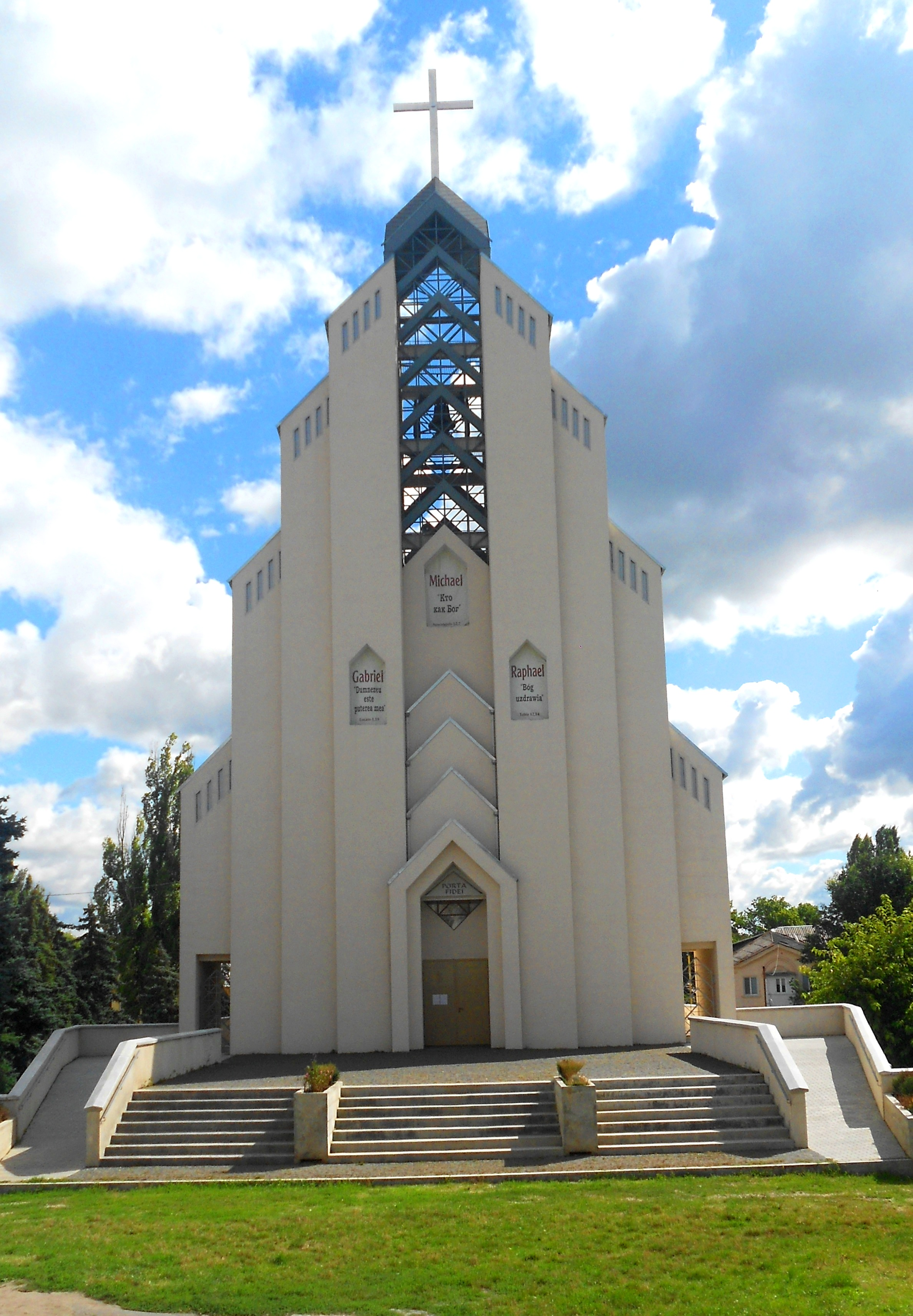
Catholic Church in Bălți

== History ==
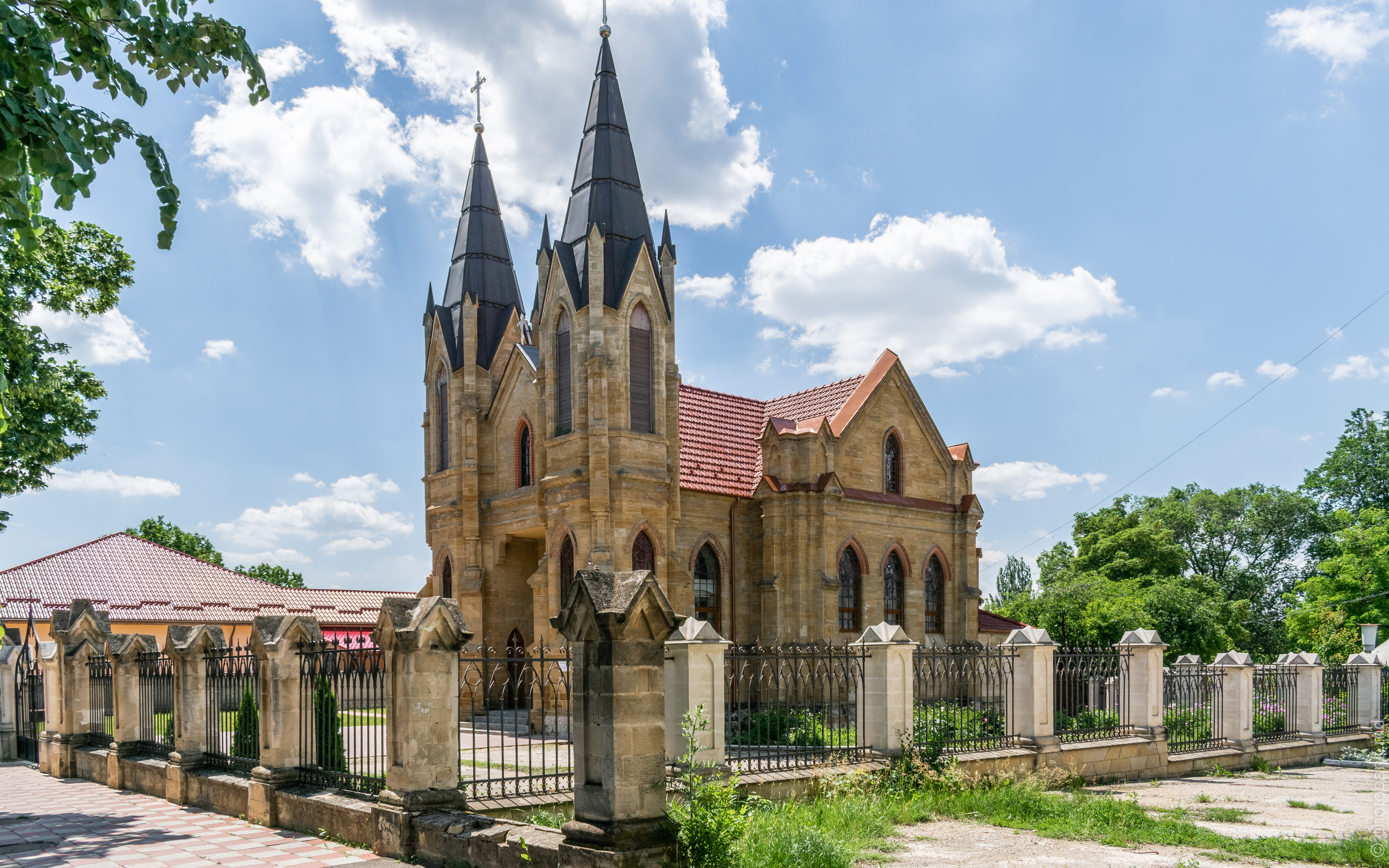
The Catholic church in Orhei

In 1227 the current territory of Moldova joined the Diocese of Milkova, formed by Pope Gregory IX. After the Mongol invasion, the Diocese of Milkova ceased to exist. In 1370, Pope Urban V formed the Diocese of Siret, which also included Moldavia. In 1413, the Diocese of Baia Mare was founded, which lasted until the beginning of the 16th century. At the beginning of the 19th century, Moldova was part of the Apostolic Vicariate of Moravia. On 27 April 1883 Pope Leo XIII established the Diocese of Iași in Romania, which included most of the current territory of Moldova. In the diocese were active Jesuits who established numerous religious, educational and charitable institutions. North Moldavia was in the Diocese of Kamenetz-Podolsk. On 3 July 1848, after the concordat between the Vatican and the Russian Empire, the Diocese of Tiraspol was formed, whose cathedra at first was in Kherson, then was moved to Tiraspol. Because of the Crimean War (1853-1856), its cathedra was transferred to Saratov, which was formed from the Tiraspol deanery, which included all of today's Moldova.

After 1917, the Diocese of Iași had jurisdiction in Moldova. During World War II, Moldova was part of the Transnistria diocese. During the Soviet Union era, the Catholic Church in Moldavia was limited. Catholic parishes in Moldova since 1945 belonged to the Archdiocese of Riga. Before 1970, the territory of Moldova had only one Catholic church in Chișinău, which was at the local cemetery. In 1979, Soviet authorities had banned the only Catholic priest in Moldova. After the formation of an independent Moldova, on 28 October 1993, the Apostolic Administration of Moldova was established and on 27 October 2001 it was converted into the Diocese of Chişinău with direct submission to the Holy See. The first bishop of the diocese is Anton Coșa.

== Statistics ==
In 2020, around 20,000 (0.56% of the total population) was Catholic.

The country forms a single diocese, the Diocese of Chişinău. In 2020 Moldova had 27 priests and 24 nuns serving across 20 parishes.

The cathedral of the diocese is the Cathedral of Divine Providence and the diocese publishes the religious periodical Good Advice. The bishop in Moldova is Anton Coșa, a Romanian-born Catholic. Besides the Latin rite faithful it serves the Greek Catholics as well.

== See also ==
- Outline of Moldova
- Religion in Moldova
- Eastern Orthodoxy in Moldova
- Romanian Catholic Church

== Bibliography ==
- The Catholic Encyclopedia, Vol. 3, ed. Franciscans, Moscow, 2007, pp. 519, ISBN 978-5-91393-016-3.
