= Demographics of Moldova =

- Moldova population pyramid in 2020
- Population: ▼2,381,300 (01.01.2025, excluding Transnistria)
- Density: 79.8 (excluding Transnistria) (2024)
- Growth rate: −2.8 (2024)
- Birth rate: 9.8 births/1,000 population (2023)
- Death rate: 13.7 deaths/1,000 population (2023)
- Life expectancy: 71.9 years (2023)
  - male: 67.5 years (2023)
  - female: 76.4 years (2023)
- Fertility rate: 1.61 children born/woman (2023)
- Infant mortality: 13.7 deaths/1,000 live births (2023)
- Net migration rate: −24.4 migrant(s)/1,000 population (2022)
- Immigrant share: 6.2% (2024)

Age structure
- 0–14 years: 16.4% (male 301,150/female 284,400)
- 15–64 years: 73.6% (male 1,277,900/female 1,341,650)
- 65 and over: 10.0% (male 133,060/female 222,270)

Sex ratio
- Total: 0.91 male(s)/female (2008 est.)
- At birth: 1.06 male(s)/female
- Under 15: 1.06 male(s)/female
- 15–64 years: 0.94 male(s)/female
- 65 and over: 0.59 male(s)/female

Nationality
- Major ethnic: Moldovans (76.7%)
- Minor ethnic: Romanians (8%), Ukrainians (4.9%), Gagauz (4.2%), Russians (3.2%), Bulgarians (1.6%), Romanies (0,4%), other groups (0.5%) (2024)

Language
- Official: Romanian
- Spoken: Romanian and other minority languages

Demographic features of the population of Republic of Moldova include distribution, ethnicity, languages, religious affiliation and other statistical data.

According to the 2014 Moldovan Census, 2,789,205 people resided in the areas controlled by the central government of Republic of Moldova. Another 209,030 were non-resident citizens living abroad, for a total of 2,998,235.

According to the 2015 census in Transnistria, 475,007 people lived in the breakaway Transnistria, including the city of Bender, and the other localities de facto controlled by Transnistrian authorities. Thus, the total population of the country in 2014 amounted to 3,473,242.

== Overview of the demographic statistics ==
View source data.
View source data.

Median age
total	34.3 years (2008 est.) (up from 32.22 years in 2005)
male	32.4 years (up from 30.14 years in 2005)
female	36.4 years (up from 34.27 years in 2005)
Literacy rate
total	96% (1989); 99.1% (2003); 99.1% (2005)
male	99% (1989); 99.6% (2003); 99.7% (2005)
female	94% (1989); 98.7% (2003); 98.6% (2005)
definition	age 15 and over can read and write
Unemployment rate
8% (official), 40% (real)
Source: The World Factbook, CIA; UN^{,}

== Urban–rural distribution of population ==
According to the 2024 census, 46,4% of the population is urban, which is a considerable increase from 2014, when only 38,5% of the population was urban.

According to the 2014 census, the largest cities under the control of the constitutional authorities are Chișinău with 644,204 (with 590,631 actual urban dwellers) and Bălți with 102,457 (97,930 urban dwellers). The autonomous territorial unit of Gagauzia has 134,535, out of which 48,666 or 36,2% are urban dwellers. Ungheni is the third largest city with 32,828, followed by Cahul with 28,763, Soroca with 22,196 and Orhei with 21,065.

=== By district (2004 census) ===
no	type	name	population	urban			rural		
				population	%	cities	population	%	communes
1	municipality	Chișinău	712,218	644,204	90.45%	7	68,014	9.55%	12
2	municipality	Bălți	127,561	122,669	96.16%	1	4,892	3.84%	2
3	auton.territ.unit	Găgăuzia	155,646	58,190	37.39%	3	97,456	62.61%	23
4	district	Anenii Noi	81,710	8,358	10.23%	1	73,352	89.77%	25
5	district	Basarabeasca	28,978	11,192	38.62%	1	17,786	61.38%	6
6	district	Briceni	78,027	14,230	18.24%	2	63,797	81.76%	26
7	district	Cahul	119,231	35,488	29.76%	1	83,743	70.24%	36
8	district	Cantemir	60,001	3,872	6.45%	1	56,129	93.55%	26
9	district	Călărași	75,075	14,516	19.34%	1	60,559	80.66%	27
10	district	Căușeni	90,612	21,941	24.21%	2	68,671	75.79%	25 (out of 28)
11	district	Cimișlia	60,925	12,858	21.10%	1	48,067	78.90%	22
12	district	Criuleni	72,254	7,138	9.88%	1	65,116	90.12%	24
13	district	Dondușeni	46,442	9,801	21.10%	1	36,641	78.90%	21
14	district	Drochia	87,092	16,606	19.07%	1	70,486	80.93%	27
15	district	Dubăsari	43,015	–	–	–	34,015	100%	11
16	district	Edineț	81,390	23,065	%	2	58,325	%	30
17	district	Fălești	90,320	14,931	%	1	75,389	%	32
18	district	Florești	89,389	17,086	%	3	17,086	%	37
19	district	Glodeni	60,975	10,465	%	1	50,510	%	18
20	district	Hîncești	119,762	15,281	%	1	104,481	%	38
21	district	Ialoveni	97,704	15,041	%	1	82,663	%	24
22	district	Leova	51,056	14,411	%	2	36,645	%	23
23	district	Nisporeni	64,924	12,105	%	1	52,819	%	22
24	district	Ocnița	56,510	19,270	%	3	37,240	%	18
25	district	Orhei	116,271	25,641	%	1	90,630	%	37
26	district	Rezina	48,105	10,196	%	1	37,909	%	24
27	district	Rîșcani	69,454	13,351	%	2	56,103	%	26
28	district	Sîngerei	87,153	15,760	%	2	71,393	%	24
29	district	Soroca	94,986	28,362	%	1	66,624	%	34
30	district	Strășeni	88,900	19,633	%	2	69,267	%	25
31	district	Șoldănești	42,227	6,304	%	1	35,923	%	22
32	district	Ștefan Vodă	70,594	7,768	%	1	62,826	%	22
33	district	Taraclia	43,154	13,756	%	1	29,398	%	14
34	district	Telenești	70,126	6,855	%	1	63,271	%	30
35	district	Ungheni	110,545	35,311	%	2	75,234	%	31
Subtotal control by central government			3,383,332	1,305,655	38.59%	54	2,077,677	61.41%	844
36	territorial unit	Transnistria	383,806	280,640^{1}	63.85%	10	158,888^{1}	36.15%	69
37	municipality	Bender	91,197	88,055	96.86%	1	3,142	3.14%	1
10	parts of district	Căușeni	14,935	–	–	–	14,935	100%	3 (out of 28)
15	parts of district	Dubăsari	715	–	–	–	715	100%	parts of 1
Subtotal control by breakaway Tiraspol			555,347	377,667	68.01%	11	177,680	31.99%	73
Total			3,938,679	1,683,322	42.74%	65	2,255,357	57.26%	917

Note: ^{1}The breakaway Transnistrian authorities count as rural the population of the towns of Crasnoe, Maiac, and Tiraspolul Nou. Since their exact population isn't available, so does this table.

Transnistrian-controlled areas (2015 cens.)
	Population	urban		rural	
		population	cities	population	communes
Tiraspol	129,367	129,367	1	–	–
Camenca District	20 542	?	1	?	12
Rîbnița District	69,000	?	1	?	22
Dubăsari District	31,000	?	1	?	9
Grigoriopol District	40,000	?^{1}	2	?^{1}	14
Slobozia District	84,000	?^{2}	4	?^{2}	12
Subtotal Transnistria	383,806	?	10	?	69
Bender (w/o Proteagailovca)	91,197	91,197	1	–	–
Proteagailovca	3,142	–	–	3,142	1
Gîsca	4,841	–	–	4,841	1
Chițcani (incl. Merenești and Zahorna)	~9,000	–	–	~9,000	1
Cremenciug	1,094	–	–	1,094	1
Roghi	715	–	–	715	parts of 1
Subotal other localities	109,989	91,197	1	18,792	4
Total Tiraspol-controlled areas	475,003	333,003	11	142,000	73

Note:
^{1} The breakaway Transnistrian authorities have counties as urban only the population of the town of Grigoriopol, while that of the town of Maiac was counted as rural.
^{2} The breakaway Transnistrian authorities have counties as urban only the population of the towns of Slobozia and Dnestrovsc, while those of the towns of Crasnoe and Tiraspolul Nou were counted as rural.

== Vital statistics ==
Bessarabia Governorate (1900–1914)
	Average population	Live births	Deaths	Natural change	Crude birth rate (per 1000)	Crude death rate (per 1000)	Natural change (per 1000)	Crude migration rate (per 1000
1900	2,037,000	83,306	48,480	34,826	40.9	23.8	17.1	
1901	2,073,000	87,797	46,296	41,501	42.3	22.3	20.0	−2.3
1902	2,113,000	96,641	55,423	41,218	45.7	26.2	19.5	−0.2
1903	2,154,000	94,936	53,236	41,700	44.1	24.7	19.4	0
1904	2,194,000	99,265	55,436	43,829	45.3	25.3	20.0	−1.4
1905	2,237,000	80,085	62,387	17,698	35.8	27.9	7.9	11.7
1906	2,267,000	95,090	55,638	39,452	41.9	24.5	17.4	−4.0
1907	2,303,000	107,195	59,964	47,231	46.5	26.0	20.5	−4.6
1908	2,345,000	96,088	54,772	41,316	41.0	23.4	17.6	0.6
1909	2,395,000	105,681	62,498	43,183	44.1	26.1	18.0	3.3
1910	2,441,000	101,544	77,356	24,188	41.6	31.7	9.9	9.3
1911	2,488,000	97,864	74,093	23,771	39.3	29.8	9.6	9.7
1912	2,540,000	102,654	77,431	25,223	40.4	30.5	9.9	11.0
1913	2,602,000	102,397	77,745	24,652	39.4	29.9	9.5	14.9
1914	2,625,000	100,871	79,202	21,669	38.4	30.2	8.3	0.5

=== After WW II, total area ===
	Average population	Live births	Deaths	Natural change	Crude birth rate (per 1000)	Crude death rate (per 1000)	Natural change (per 1000)	Crude migration rate (per 1000)	Total fertility rate	Urban Fertility	Rural Fertility
1945	2,028,000	42,795	78,797	−36,002	21.1	38.9	−17.8				
1946	2,108,000	64,462	64,371	91	28.6	28.5	0.1	111.3			
1947	2,188,000	57,555	165,049	−107,494	26.3	75.5	−49.2	19.9			
1948	2,239,000	73,123	35,846	37,277	34.4	16.9	17.5	19.9			
1949	2,290,000	94,180	30,407	63,773	42.1	13.6	28.5	23.2			
1950	2,341,000	91,137	26,363	64,774	38.9	11.3	27.7	19.3			
1951	2,381,000	91,645	25,957	65,688	38.5	10.9	27.6	−10.5			
1952	2,432,000	80,918	30,968	49,950	33.3	12.7	20.5	0.9			
1953	2,491,000	79,041	23,257	55,784	31.7	9.3	22.4	1.9			
1954	2,557,000	83,607	24,077	59,530	32.7	9.4	23.3	3.2			
1955	2,627,000	79,772	21,864	57,908	30.4	8.3	22.0	5.4			
1956	2,701,000	81,372	20,109	61,263	30.1	7.4	22.7	5.5			
1957	2,777,000	85,743	21,114	64,629	30.9	7.6	23.3	4.8			
1958	2,853,000	87,502	18,741	68,761	30.7	6.6	24.1	3.3	3.54		
1959	2,929,000	92,176	21,467	70,709	31.5	7.3	24.1	2.5	3.64		
1960	3,003,000	87,910	19,290	68,620	29.3	6.4	22.9	2.4	3.41		
1961	3,073,000	86,683	19,590	67,093	28.2	6.4	21.8	1.5	3.20		
1962	3,141,000	80,494	21,365	59,129	25.6	6.8	18.8	3.3	3.00		
1963	3,208,000	78,422	20,737	57,685	24.4	6.5	18.0	3.3	2.89		
1964	3,273,000	73,583	19,944	53,639	22.5	6.1	16.4	3.9	2.71		
1965	3,335,000	67,996	20,571	47,425	20.4	6.2	14.2	4.7	2.68		
1966	3,395,000	71,406	21,474	49,932	21.0	6.3	14.5	3.5	2.73		
1967	3,453,000	71,380	23,406	47,974	20.7	6.8	13.7	3.4	2.69		
1968	3,506,000	69,997	24,268	45,729	20.0	6.9	13.0	2.3	2.65		
1969	3,549,000	67,575	26,249	41,326	19.0	7.4	11.5	0.8	2.58		
1970	3,594,000	69,778	26,577	43,201	19.4	7.4	12.0	0.7	2.56		
1971	3,647,000	73,643	27,889	45,754	20.2	7.6	12.5	2.2	2.63		
1972	3,700,000	76,198	28,001	48,197	20.6	7.6	13.0	1.5	2.63		
1973	3,748,000	76,339	30,756	45,583	20.4	8.2	12.2	0.8	2.59		
1974	3,794,000	77,474	32,216	45,258	20.4	8.5	11.9	0.4	2.55		
1975	3,839,000	79,169	35,635	43,534	20.6	9.3	11.3	0.6	2.52		
1976	3,877,000	79,863	34,812	45,051	20.6	9.0	11.6	−1.7	2.46		
1977	3,910,000	79,022	37,250	41,772	20.2	9.5	10.7	−2.2	2.40		
1978	3,936,000	78,994	38,410	40,584	20.1	9.8	10.3	−3.7	2.38	1.70	3.00
1979	3,967,000	80,152	41,729	38,423	20.2	10.5	9.7	−1.8	2.39	1.80	2.90
1980	4,010,000	79,580	40,472	39,108	19.8	10.1	9.8	1.0	2.41	1.80	2.90
1981	4,054,000	82,279	41,476	40,803	20.3	10.2	10.1	0.9	2.45	1.80	3.10
1982	4,097,000	83,258	41,046	42,212	20.3	10.0	10.3	0.3	2.43	1.79	3.19
1983	4,137,000	91,304	44,329	46,975	22.1	10.7	11.4	−1.6	2.57	1.87	3.46
1984	4,175,000	89,637	45,537	44,100	21.5	10.9	10.6	−1.4	2.67	1.95	3.65
1985	4,214,000	90,453	46,075	44,378	21.5	10.9	10.5	−1.2	2.70	2.00	3.70
1986	4,255,000	94,726	40,437	54,289	22.3	9.5	12.8	−3.1	2.78	2.00	3.80
1987	4,290,000	91,762	40,185	51,577	21.4	9.4	12.0	−3.8	2.70	2.10	3.80
1988	4,321,000	88,568	40,912	47,656	20.5	9.5	11.0	−3.8	2.63	2.00	3.60
1989	4,349,000	82,221	40,113	42,108	18.9	9.2	9.7	−3.2	2.46	2.02	3.00
1990	4,364,000	77,085	42,427	34,658	17.7	9.7	7.9	−4.5	2.39	1.91	3.07
1991	4,363,000	72,020	45,849	26,171	16.5	10.5	6.0	−6.2	2.26	1.79	2.84
1992	4,353,000	69,654	44,522	25,132	16.0	10.2	5.8	−8.1	2.21	1.68	2.86
1993	4,350,000	66,179	46,637	19,542	15.2	10.7	4.5	−5.2	2.10	1.53	2.77
1994	4,350,000	62,085	51,514	10,571	14.3	12.0	2.3	−2.3	1.95	1.44	2.54
1995	4,340,000	56,411	52,969	3,442	13.0	12.2	0.8	−3.1	1.76	1.31	2.24
1996	4,325,000	51,865	49,748	2,117	12.0	11.5	0.5	−4.0	1.60	1.19	2.05
1997	4,311,000	51,286	51,138	148	11.9	11.9	0.0	−3.2	1.55		
1998	4,309,000	46,705	47,691	−986	10.8	11.0	−0.2	1.8	1.48		
1999	4,312,000	43,511	48,904	−5,393	10.1	11.4	−1.3	−1.2	1.43		

(e)= estimate

=== Moldova under central government control ===
- Source: National Bureau of Statistics

	Average population	Live births	Deaths	Natural change	Crude birth rate (per 1000)	Crude death rate (per 1000)	Natural change (per 1000)	Crude migration rate (per 1000)	Total fertility rate (TFR)	Urban TFR	Rural TFR	Life Expectancy (total)	Life Expectancy (male)	Life Expectancy (female)
1997	3,654,000	45,583	42,957	2,626	12.5	11.8	0.7		1.73	1.36	2.09	66.61	62.86	70.30
1998	3,652,000	41,332	39,922	1,410	11.3	10.9	0.4	−0.9	1.67	1.32	2.03	67.77	64.03	71.39
1999	3,647,000	38,501	41,315	−2,814	10.6	11.3	−0.8	−0.6	1.61	1.26	1.97	67.44	63.74	71.04
2000	3,640,000	36,939	41,224	−4,285	10.2	11.3	−1.2	−0.7	1.57	1.23	1.95	67.59	63.87	71.22
2001	3,631,000	36,448	40,075	−3,627	10.0	11.0	−1.0	−1.5	1.48	1.21	1.92	68.20	64.50	71.75
2002	3,623,000	35,705	41,852	−6,147	9.9	11.6	−1.7	−0.5	1.41	1.13	1.89	68.13	64.40	71.71
2003	3,613,000	36,471	43,079	−6,608	10.1	11.9	−1.8	−1.0	1.47	1.18	1.88	68.13	64.47	71.64
2004	3,604,000	38,272	41,668	−3,396	10.6	11.6	−0.9	−1.6	1.50	1.19	1.91	68.38	64.50	72.16
2005	3,595,000	37,695	44,689	−6,994	10.5	12.4	−1.9	−0.6	1.219	0.94	1.301	67.85	63.84	71.66
2006	3,586,000	37,587	43,137	−5,550	10.5	12.0	−1.5	−1.0	1.228	1.025	1.387	68.40	64.57	72.23
2007	3,577,000	37,973	43,050	−5,077	10.6	12.0	−1.4	−1.1	1.256	0.973	1.543	68.79	65.04	72.56
2008	3,570,000	39,018	41,948	−2,930	10.9	11.7	−0.8	−1.2	1.277	1.018	1.533	69.36	65.55	73.17
2009	3,566,000	40,803	42,139	−1,336	11.4	11.8	−0.4	−0.7	1.326	1.048	1.582	69.31	65.31	73.37
2010	3,563,000	40,474	43,631	−3,157	11.4	12.3	−0.9	0.1	1.309	1.055	1.531	69.11	65.00	73.41
2011	3,560,000	39,182	39,249	−67	11.0	11.0	−0.0	−0.8	1.266	1.009	1.482	70.88	66.82	74.93
2012	3,560,000	39,435	39,560	−125	11.0	11.1	−0.1	0.1	1.279	1.030	1.483	71.12	67.24	74.99
2013	3,559,000	37,871	38,060	−189	10.6	10.7	−0.1	−0.2	1.238	0.975	1.449	71.85	68.05	75.55
2014	2,857,815	40,709	39,522	1,187	14.3	13.8	0.5	−197.5	1.82	1.52	2.04	69.33	65.20	73.60
2015	2,835,978	40,547	39,800	747	14.4	14.1	0.4	−8.0	1.87	1.52	2.11	69.37	65.22	73.72
2016	2,803,186	39,640	38,412	1,228	14.3	13.7	0.5	−12.1	1.89	1.56	2.12	69.85	65.68	74.20
2017	2,755,189	36,363	36,779	−416	13.2	13.3	−0.2	−16.9	1.81	1.49	2.03	70.77	66.71	74.92
2018	2,707,203	34,537	37,263	−2,726	12.8	13.8	−1.0	−16.4	1.81	1.48	2.03	70.6	66.3	75.0
2019	2,664,224	32,423	36,411	−3,988	12.2	13.7	−1.5	-14.4	1.78	1.47	1.99	70.9	66.8	75.2
2020	2,635,130	30,834	40,717	−9,883	11.7	15.5	−3.8	−7.1	1.76	1.46	1.98	69.9	66.0	73.9
2021	2,595,809	29,320	45,464	−16,144	11.3	17.5	−6.2	−8.7	1.75	1.48	1.94	69.0	65.1	72.9
2022	2,528,654	27,018	36,196	–9,178	10.7	14.3	−3.6	−18.3	1.69	1.46	1.87	71.4	67.1	75.7
2023	2,429,352	24,123	33,782	–9,659	9.8	13.7	−3.9	−13.1	1.61			71.8	67.4	76.4
2024	2,402,060	23,658	33,545	–9,887	9.8	13.9	−4.1	–7.3	1.66			72.0	67.6	76.4
2025	2,377,108	22,108	32,074	–9,966	9.3	13.5	−4.2		1.68			72.8	68.4	77.2
2026	2,365,600													

- Starting with 2014, the sharp changes in the statistics are because of the new calculation methods and according with the latest census, and include only data of resident people that lived in the country predominantly during the last 12 months, regardless of temporary absences (for the purpose of recreation, vacations, visits to relatives and friends, business, medical treatment, religious pilgrimages, etc.).

Total fertility rates by development regions (2025)
Regions	TFR
Southern Development Region	1.95
Central Development Region	1.88
Northern Development Region	1.86
Gagauzia	1.83
Moldova	1.68
Bălți Municipality	1.56
Chișinău Municipality	1.36

Total fertility rate by district (2025)
Districts	TFR
Șoldănești	2.31
Glodeni	2.21
Sîngerei	2.18
Fălești	2.16
Cantemir	2.11
Nisporeni	2.10
Ștefan Vodă	2.09
Dubăsari	2.08
Leova	2.04
Călărași	2.03
Florești	2.02
Taraclia	2.02
Rezina	2.01
Basarabeasca	1.99
Hîncești	1.96
Orhei	1.95
Rîșcani	1.94
Soroca	1.93
Ungheni	1.90
Dondușeni	1.90
Cimișlia	1.89
Criuleni	1.88
Telenești	1.86
Edineț	1.86
Strășeni	1.86
Căușeni	1.85
Drochia	1.84
Gagauzia	1.83
Cahul	1.83
Anenii Noi	1.74
Moldova	1.68
Briceni	1.64
Bălți	1.56
Ialoveni	1.51
Chișinău	1.36
Ocnița	1.35

Current vital statistics
Period	Live births	Deaths	Natural increase
January–September 2025	16,961	24,049	−7,088
January–September 2026	15,970	24,595	−8,625
Difference	▼ –991 (–5.84%)	▲ +546 (+2.27%)	▼ –1,537

=== Structure of the population ===
Population by Sex and Age Group (12.V.2014) (Excludes non-residents present in country at time of census (visitors, foreigners temporarily residing in country, etc.). Tiraspol, Bender, Slobozia, Ribnita, Camenca Yrigoricpol/Grigoriopol are districts from Transnistria where the census was not conducted.)

Age group	Male	Female	Total	%
Total	1 352 099	1 452 702	2 804 801	100
0–4	88 311	83 681	171 992	6.13
5–9	82 455	78 229	160 684	5.73
10–14	77 275	72 752	150 027	5.35
15–19	93 727	89 965	183 692	6.55
20–24	118 376	112 777	231 153	8.24
25–29	129 771	121 694	251 465	8.97
30–34	109 201	105 669	214 870	7.66
35–39	95 575	95 220	190 795	6.80
40–44	87 451	89 455	176 906	6.31
45–49	84 288	89 276	173 564	6.19
50–54	98 512	110 162	208 674	7.44
55–59	93 612	110 213	203 825	7.27
60–64	79 681	102 009	181 690	6.48
65–69	39 652	55 755	95 407	3.40
70–74	32 645	52 625	85 270	3.04
75–79	22 757	42 339	65 096	2.32
80–84	12 543	25 437	37 980	1.35
85–89	4 801	11 701	16 502	0.59
90–94	1 148	3 129	4 277	0.15
95–99	158	416	574	0.02
100+	160	198	358	0.01
Age group	Male	Female	Total	Percent
0–14	248 041	234 662	482 703	17.21
15–64	990 194	1 026 440	2 016 634	71.90
65+	113 864	191 600	305 464	10.89

Population Estimates by Sex and Age Group (01.VII.2021) (Provisional Estimates)

Age group	Male	Female	Total	%
Total	1 247 309	1 367 890	2 615 199	100
0–4	78 991	73 900	152 891	5.85
5–9	86 335	81 443	167 777	6.42
10–14	80 298	76 162	156 459	5.98
15–19	70 362	66 581	136 943	5.24
20–24	67 961	64 991	132 952	5.08
25–29	86 318	86 189	172 505	6.60
30–34	105 175	104 312	209 486	8.01
35–39	102 957	102 774	205 730	7.87
40–44	87 693	89 962	177 654	6.79
45–49	83 770	87 522	171 291	6.55
50–54	78 838	84 168	163 005	6.23
55–59	82 822	95 630	178 450	6.82
60–64	87 913	110 597	198 508	7.59
65–69	66 170	94 832	161 002	6.16
70–74	44 974	72 212	117 186	4.48
75–79	18 045	34 127	52 171	1.99
80–84	12 325	27 466	39 788	1.52
85+	6 380	15 045	21 425	0.82
Age group	Male	Female	Total	Percent
0–14	245 624	231 505	477 129	18.24
15–64	853 791	892 703	1 746 494	66.78
65+	147 894	243 682	391 576	14.97

Transnistrian-controlled areas
	Average population	Live births	Deaths	Natural change	Crude birth rate (per 1000)	Crude death rate (per 1000)	Natural change (per 1000)
1997	657,000	5,703	8,181	−2,478	8.7	12.5	−3.8
1998	665,000	5,373	7,769	−2,396	8.1	11.7	−3.6
1999	660,000	5,010	7,589	−2,579	7.6	11.5	−3.9
2000	651,000	5,010	7,770	−2,760	7.7	11.9	−4.2
2001	642,000	4,505	7,759	−3,254	7.0	12.1	−5.1
2002	633,000	4,630	8,118	−3,488	7.3	12.8	−5.5
2003	623,000	4,440	8,192	−3,752	7.1	13.1	−6.0
2004	554,000	4,840	8,031	−3,191	8.7	14.5	−5.8
2005	547,000	4,664	8,186	−3,522	8.5	15.0	−7.5
2006	540,000	4,868	8,306	3,438	9.0	15.4	−6.4
2007	533,000	4,893	8,132	−3,239	9.2	15.2	−6.1
2008	527,000	5,290	7,967	−2,677	10.0	15.1	−5.1
2009	522,000	5,189	7,454	−2,265	9.9	14.3	−4.3
2010	518,000	5,189	7,709	−2,520	10.0	14.9	−4.9
2011	513,000	4,999	7,289	−2,290	9.7	14.2	−4.5
2012	509,000	5,173	7,280	−2,107	10.2	14.3	−4.1
2013	505,000	4,806	6,867	−2,061	9.5	13.6	−4.1
2014	500,000	4,994	7,313	−2,319	10.0	14.6	−4.6
2015	474,000	4,959	7,094	−2,135	10.5	15.0	−4.5
2016	470,000	4,676	6,758	−2,082	9.9	14.4	−4.5
2017	469,000	4,500	6,684	−2,184	9.6	14.3	−4.7
2018	465,000	4,086	6,727	−2,641	8.8	14.5	−5.7
2019	465,000	3,646	6,810	−3,164	7.8	14.6	−6.8
2020	465,000	3,463	7,258	−3,795	7.4	15.6	−8.1
2021	465,000	3,144	8,980	−5,836	6.8	19.3	−12.5
2022	459,800	2,820	6,483	−3,663	6.1	14.1	−8.0
2023	455,700	2,588	6,152	−3,564	5.7	13.5	−7.8
2024	451,644	2,279	5,797	−3,518	5.0	12.8	−7.8
2025	~440,300	1,837	5,850	−4,013	4.1	13.1	−9.0

Current vital statistics
Period	Live births	Deaths	Natural increase
January – December 2024	2,279	5,797	−3,518
January – December 2025	1,837	5,850	−4,013
Difference	▼ −442 (−19.39%)	▲ +53 (+0.91%)	▼495

Fertility Rate (The Demographic Health Survey, Wanted Fertility Rate) and CBR (Crude Birth Rate)
Year	CBR (Total)	TFR (Total)	CBR (Urban)	TFR (Urban)	CBR (Rural)	TFR (Rural)
2005	12,0	1,7	12,5	1,5	11,7	1,8

== Ethnic groups and census numbers ==
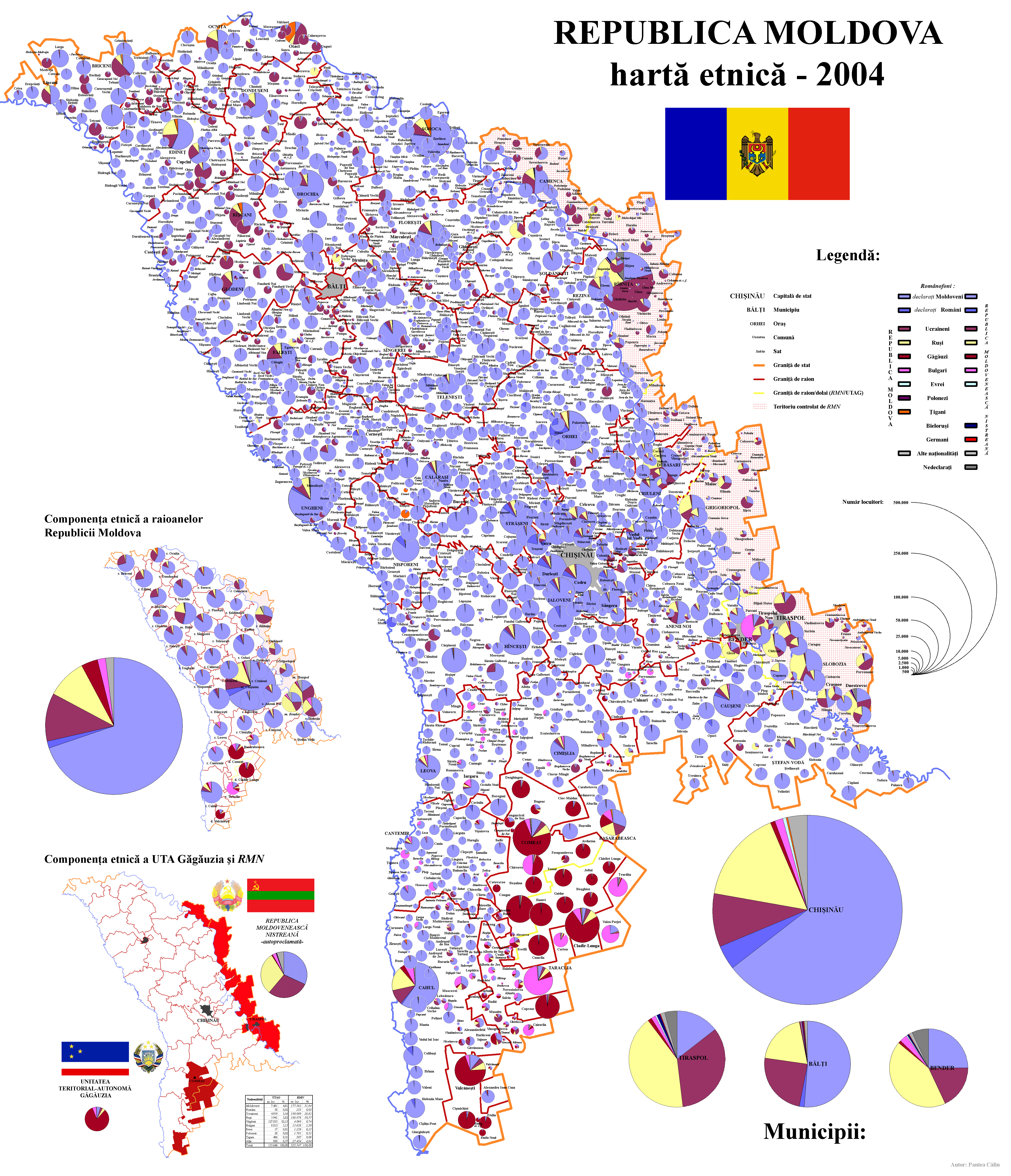
Ethnic map of Moldova (2004 data)

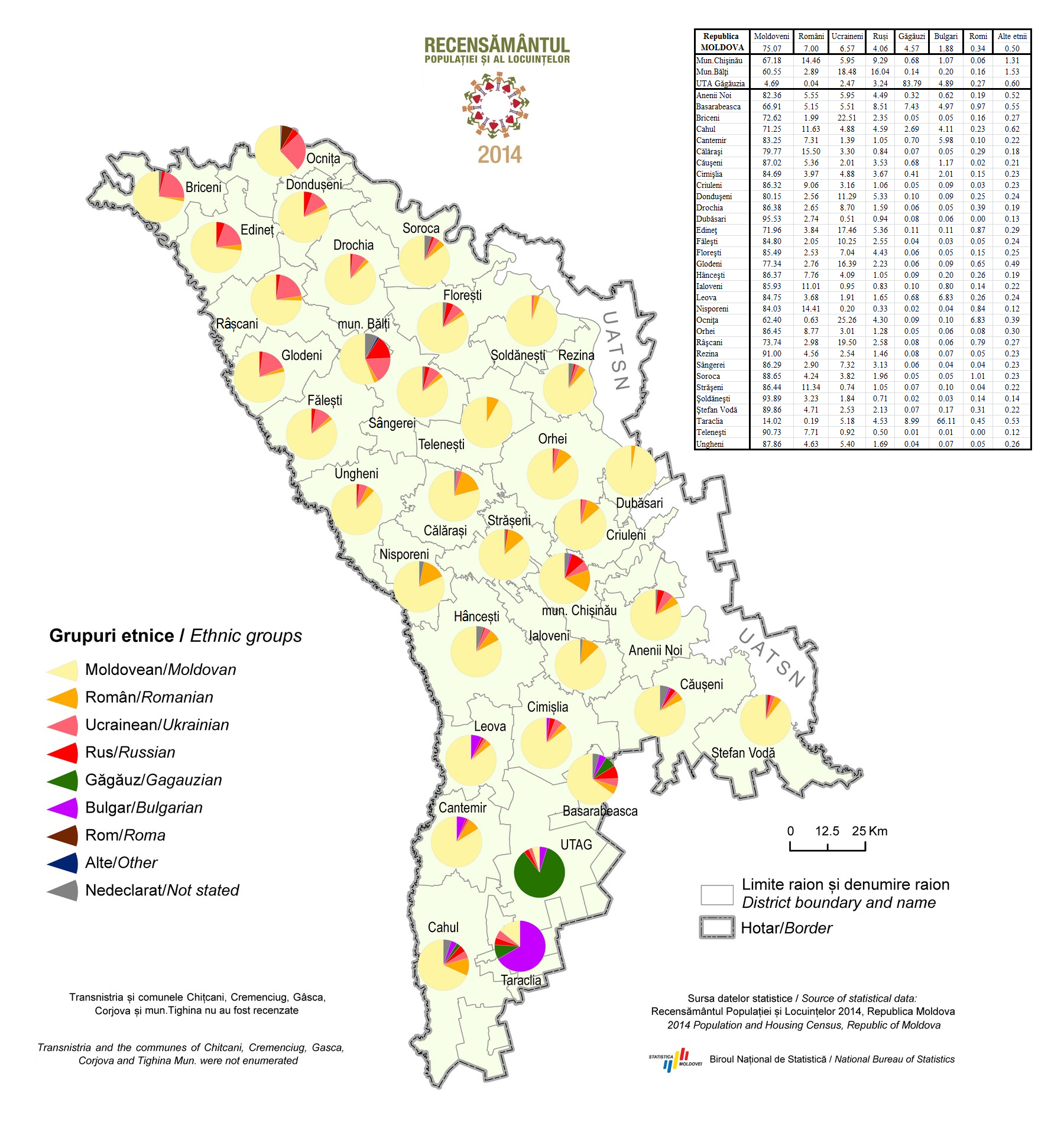
Ethnic map of Moldova (2014 data)

Of the total population that declared its ethnicity, in the 2024 Moldovan census, 76.7% declared themselves Moldovans, 8% Romanians, 5.1% Ukrainians, 4.0% Gagauz, 3.4% Russian, 1.6% Bulgarian, 0.4% Roma/Gypsy and 0.5% declared themselves of other ethnicities. Of the total urban population that declared its first ethnicity in 2024, 70.5% declared themselves Moldovan, 9.7% Romanian, 6.1% Ukrainian, 5.9% Russian, 4.1% Gagauz, 2.1% Bulgarian, 0.6% Roma/Gypsy and 1% other ethnicities. Moreover, 5.7% of the total population declared Romanian as their second ethnicity, 1.4% declared Moldovan, 0.4%, Russian, 0.2% Ukrainian and 0.1% Bulgarian.

Out of the 2,804,801 people covered by the 2014 Moldovan census, 2,754,719 gave an answer as to their ethnic affiliation. Among them, 2,068,068 or 73.7% declared themselves Moldovans and 192,800 or 6.9% Romanians. Some organisations such as the Liberal party of Moldova have criticised the census results, claiming Romanians comprise 85% of the population and that census officials have pressured respondents to declare themselves Moldovans instead of Romanians and have purposefully failed to cover urban respondents who are more likely to declared themselves Romanians as opposed to Moldovans.

At the same time, 181,035 declared themselves Ukrainians, 111,726 Russians, 126,010 Gagauz and 51,867 Bulgarians. The proportion of Ukrainians and Russians in the area controlled by Chișinău has fallen from 8,4% to 6,5% and 5,9% to 4,0% respectively between 2004 and 2014. Meanwhile, the percentage of Gagauz has risen slightly from 4,4% in 2004 to 4,5% in 2014.

The proportion of Ukrainians and Russians in the previous 2004 census also decreased considerably in comparison to the last Soviet census in 1989: from 13.8% to 11.2% and from 13.0% to 9.4% respectively out of the combined population including Transnistria. This is mostly due to emigration.

Ukrainians mostly live in the east (Transnistria) and the north, while Russians mostly live in urban areas: 27% of all Russians live in Chișinău, 18% live in Tiraspol, 11% in Bender and 6% in Bălți. Most of the Gagauz live in the south of Moldova in the autonomous region of Gagauzia.

=== Total area ===
Population of Moldova according to ethnic group in 1959–2004
Ethnic group	census 1959^{1}		census 1970^{2}		census 1979^{3}		census 1989^{4}		census 2004^{5}	
Ethnic group	Number	%	Number	%	Number	%	Number	%	Number	%
Moldovans^{*}	1,886,566	65.4	2,303,916	64.6	2,525,687	63.9	2,794,749	64.5	2,742,231	69.6
Romanians^{*}	1,663	0.1	1,581	0.0	1,657	0.0	2,477	0.1	73,529	1.9
Ukrainians	420,820	14.6	506,560	14.2	560,679	14.2	600,366	13.8	442,475	11.2
Russians	292,930	10.2	414,444	11.6	505,730	12.8	562,069	13.0	369,896	9.4
Gagauzians	95,856	3.3	124,902	3.5	138,000	3.5	153,548	3.5	151,596	3.8
Bulgarians	61,652	2.1	73,776	2.1	80,665	2.0	88,419	2.0	79,520	2.0
Romani	7,265	0.3	9,235	0.3	10,666	0.3	11,571	0.3	12,778	0.3
Jews	95,104	3.3	98,062	2.7	80,124	2.0	65,799	1.5	4,867	0.1
Poles	4,783	0.2	4,899	0.1	4,961	0.1	4,739	0.1	4,174	0.1
Others	17,838	0.6	31,498	0.9	41,587	1.1	51,623	1.2	57,613	1.5
Total	2,884,477		3,568,873		3,949,756		4,335,360		3,938,679	
^{1} Source:. ^{2} Source:. ^{3} Source:. ^{4} Source:. ^{5} Source: ^{5}:2004 combined censuses of the government-controlled area and Transnistria. ^{*} There is an ongoing controversy, whether Romanians and Moldovans should be counted together.

=== Government controlled-area ===
Population of Moldova according to ethnic group in 2014–2024 (excluding Transnistria)
Ethnic group	census 2014		census 2024	
Ethnic group	Number	%	Number	%
Moldovans	1,921,527	74.02	1,848,670	76.73
Romanians	170,881	6.58	193,197	8.02
Ukrainians	172,342	6.64	123,586	5.13
Gagauzians	112,289	4.33	97,205	4.03
Russians	105,656	4.07	81,630	3.39
Bulgarians	47,414	1.83	38,236	1.59
Gypsies	8,525	0.33	9,356	0.39
Belarusians	→		2,143	0.09
Jews	1,597	0.06	1,640	0.07
Poles	1,404	0.05	1,184	0.05
Armenians	→		958	
Turks	→		800	
Germans	→		763	
Azerbaijanis	→		708	
Arabs	→		606	
Tatars	→		417	
Italians	→		282	
Georgians	→		277	
Greeks	→		237	
Others	9,888	0.38	3,865	0.16
Undeclared	44,244	1.70	3,448	0.14
Total	2,595,771		2,409,207	
Source: National Bureau of Statistics

Declared country of birth for the current inhabitants of the part of Moldova under the central government control, according to the 2004 census:

ethnic group	total population					urban					rural				
	total	Moldova	former USSR	other countries	non-declared	total	Moldova	former USSR	other countries	non-declared	total	Moldova	former USSR	other countries	non-declared
Moldovans and Romanians	2,638,125; 100%	2,604,051; 98.71%	30,360; 1.15%	3,345; 0.13%	369; 0.01%	870,445; 100%	848,554 %	19,501 %	2,081 %	309 %	1,767,680; 100%	1,755,497 %	10,859 %	1,264 %	60 %
Ukrainians	282,406; 100%	227,750; 80.65%	54,036; 19.13%	598; 0.21%	22; 0.01%	145,890; 100%	103,039 %	42,318 %	514 %	19 %	136,516; 100%	%	11,718 %	84 %	3 %
Russians	201,218; 100%	129,664; 64.44%	70,380; 34.98%	1,096; 0.54%	78; 0.04%	166,395; 100%	106,580 %	58,739 %	1,011 %	65 %	34,823; 100%	23,084 %	11,641 %	85 %	13 %
Gagauzians	147,500; 100%	144,268; 97.81%	3,101; 2.10%	120; 0.08%	11; 0.01%	53,613; 100%	51,586 %	1,941 %	76 %	10 %	93,887; 100%	92,682 %	1,160 %	44 %	1 %
Bulgarians	65,662; 100%	59,489; 90.60%	5,968; 9.09%	199; 0.30%	6; 0.01%	29,447; 100%	25,215 %	4,071 %	156 %	5 %	36,215; 100%	34,274 %	1,897 %	43 %	1 %
others	34,401; 100%	22,702; 65.99%	10,797; 31.39%	894; 2.60%	8; 0.02%	26,058; 100%	16,973 %	8,358 %	722 %	5 %	8,343; 100%	5,729 %	2,439 %	172 %	3 %
non-declared	14,020; 100%	13,894; 99.10%	12; 0.09%	28; 0.20%	86; 0.61%	13,807; 100%	13,668 %	9 %	27 %	83 %	213; 100%	206 %	3 %	1 %	3 %
Total	3,383,332; 100%	3,201,818; 94.64%	174,654; 5.16%	6,280; 0.19%	580; 0.02%	1,305,655; 100%	1,165,635; 89.28%	134,937; 10.33%	4,587; 0.35%	496; 0.04%	2,077,677; 100%	2,036,183; 98.00%	39,717; 1.91%	1,693; 0.08%	84; 0.004%

Population by district, according to the 2004 census:

	Population	Moldovans^{1}	Ukrainians	Russians	Gagauzians	Bulgarians	Romanians^{1}	Jews	Poles	Gypsies	others
Chișinău	712,218	481,626 67.62%	58,945 8.28%	99,149 13.92%	6,446 0.91%	8,868 1.25%	31,984 4.49%	2,649 0.37%	834 0.12%	507 0.07%	21,210 2.98%
Bălți	127,561	66,877 52.43%	30,288 23.74%	24,526 19.23%	243 0.19%	297 0.23%	2,258 1.77%	411 0.32%	862 0.68%	272 0.21%	1,527 1.20%
Gagauzia	155,646	7,481 4.81%	4,919 3.16%	5,941 3.82%	127,835 82.13%	8,013 5.15%	38 0.02%	17 0.01%	28 0.02%	486 0.31%	888 0.57%
Anenii Noi	81,710	68,761 84.15%	6,526 7.99%	4,135 5.06%	235 0.29%	481 0.59%	857 1.05%	17 0.02%	28 0.03%	228 0.28%	442 0.54%
Basarabeasca	28,978	20,218 69.77%	1,948 6.72%	2,568 8.86%	2,220 7.66%	1,544 5.33%	70 0.24%	13 0.04%	5 0.02%	216 0.75%	176 0.61%
Briceni	78,027	55,123 70.65%	19,939 25.55%	2,061 2.64%	59 0.08%	45 0.06%	314 0.40%	84 0.11%	10 0.01%	187 0.24%	205 0.26%
Cahul	119,231	91,001 76.32%	7,842 6.58%	7,702 6.46%	3,665 3.07%	5,816 4.88%	2,095 1.76%	40 0.03%	29 0.02%	238 0.20%	803 0.67%
Cantemir	60,001	52,986 88.31%	969 1.61%	710 1.18%	519 0.86%	3,736 6.23%	910 1.52%	– 0%	11 0.02%	43 0.07%	117 0.19%
Călărași	75,075	69,190 92.16%	2,799 3.73%	947 1.26%	54 0.07%	47 0.06%	1,490 1.98%	21 0.03%	11 0.01%	378 0.50%	138 0.18%
Căușeni	90,612	79,432 87.66%	2,469 2.72%	3,839 4.24%	653 0.72%	1,108 1.22%	2,844 3.14%	8 0.01%	9 0.01%	30 0.03%	220 0.24%
Cimișlia	60,925	52,972 86.95%	3,376 5.54%	2,371 3.89%	278 0.46%	1,341 2.20%	331 0.54%	7 0.01%	10 0.02%	95 0.16%	144 0.24%
Criuleni	72,254	67,046 92.79%	2,692 3.73%	1,008 1.40%	49 0.07%	72 0.10%	1,170 1.62%	6 0.01%	6 0.01%	36 0.05%	169 0.23%
Dondușeni	46,442	37,302 80.32%	5,893 12.69%	2,714 5.84%	31 0.07%	36 0.08%	247 0.53%	12 0.03%	15 0.03%	68 0.15%	124 0.27%
Drochia	87,092	74,369 85.39%	9,849 11.31%	1,641 1.88%	44 0.05%	33 0.04%	675 0.78%	14 0.02%	10 0.01%	272 0.31%	185 0.21%
Dubăsari	34,015	32,652 95.99%	521 1.53%	611 1.80%	45 0.13%	16 0.05%	102 0.30%	9 0.03%	2 0.01%	– 0%	57 0.17%
Edineț	81,390	58,749 72.18%	16,084 19.76%	5,084 6.25%	143 0.18%	91 0.11%	446 0.55%	23 0.03%	26 0.03%	499 0.61%	245 0.30%
Fălești	90,320	75,863 83.99%	10,711 11.86%	3,064 3.39%	39 0.04%	32 0.04%	306 0.34%	6 0.01%	20 0.02%	57 0.06%	222 0.25%
Florești	89,389	75,797 84.79%	8,023 8.98%	4,633 5.18%	45 0.05%	51 0.06%	433 0.48%	19 0.02%	29 0.03%	120 0.13%	239 0.27%
Glodeni	60,975	46,317 75.96%	11,918 19.55%	1,693 2.78%	32 0.05%	44 0.07%	329 0.54%	8 0.01%	174 0.29%	303 0.50%	157 0.26%
Hîncești	119,762	108,189 90.34%	6,218 5.19%	1,463 1.22%	99 0.08%	212 0.18%	3,046 2.54%	19 0.02%	16 0.01%	305 0.25%	195 0.16%
Ialoveni	97,704	91,379 93.53%	1,117 1.14%	1,112 1.14%	95 0.10%	935 0.96%	2,608 2.67%	5 0.01%	12 0.01%	197 0.20%	244 0.25%
Leova	51,056	43,673 85.54%	1,245 2.44%	1,167 2.29%	432 0.85%	3,804 7.45%	471 0.92%	8 0.02%	9 0.02%	105 0.21%	142 0.28%
Nisporeni	64,924	60,774 93.61%	223 0.34%	339 0.52%	17 0.03%	28 0.04%	2,329 3.59%	1 <0.01%	4 0.01%	1,147 1.77%	62 0.10%
Ocnița	56,510	32,491 57.50%	17,351 30.70%	2,764 4.89%	79 0.14%	60 0.11%	104 0.18%	14 0.02%	43 0.08%	3,417 6.05%	187 0.33%
Orhei	116,271	100,469 86.41%	4,520 3.89%	2,216 1.91%	113 0.10%	90 0.08%	8,253 7.10%	46 0.04%	23 0.02%	221 0.19%	320 0.28%
Rezina	48,105	44,721 92.97%	1,691 3.52%	1,093 2.27%	34 0.07%	40 0.08%	375 0.78%	30 0.06%	5 0.01%	13 0.03%	103 0.21%
Rîșcani	69,454	50,391 72.55%	15,632 22.51%	1,726 2.49%	60 0.09%	61 0.09%	777 1.12%	8 0.01%	42 0.06%	602 0.87%	155 0.22%
Sîngerei	87,153	74,139 85.07%	8,456 9.70%	3,029 3.48%	47 0.05%	43 0.05%	1,162 1.33%	10 0.01%	48 0.06%	56 0.06%	163 0.19%
Soroca	94,986	84,728 89.20%	4,752 5%	2,601 2.74%	53 0.06%	48 0.05%	931 0.98%	65 0.07%	17 0.02%	1,564 1.65%	227 0.24%
Strășeni	88,900	83,368 93.78%	985 1.11%	1,576 1.77%	70 0.08%	109 0.12%	2,542 2.86%	13 0.01%	14 0.02%	24 0.03%	199 0.22%
Șoldănești	42,227	40,354 95.56%	1,055 2.50%	376 0.89%	9 0.02%	14 0.03%	299 0.71%	2 <0.01%	– 0%	74 0.18%	44 0.10%
Ștefan Vodă	70,594	65,318 92.53%	2,182 3.09%	1,918 2.72%	64 0.09%	145 0.21%	562 0.80%	1 <0.01%	4 0.01%	219 0.31%	181 0.26%
Taraclia	43,154	5,980 13.86%	2,646 6.13%	2,139 4.96%	3,587 8.31%	28,293 65.56%	29 0.07%	2 <0.01%	9 0.02%	218 0.51%	251 0.58%
Telenești	70,126	67,309 95.98%	879 1.25%	537 0.77%	16 0.02%	16 0.02%	1,262 1.80%	4 0.01%	1 <0.01%	6 0.01%	96 0.14%
Ungheni	110,545	97,805 88.48%	7,743 7%	2,766 2.50%	90 0.08%	93 0.08%	1,627 1.47%	16 0.01%	17 0.02%	68 0.06%	320 0.29%
Subtotal controlled by central government	3,383,332	2,564,850 75.80%	282,406 8.35%	201,218 5.95%	147,500 4.36%	65,662 1.94%	73,276 2.16%	3,608 0.11%	2,383 0.07%	12,271 0.36%	30,157 0.89%

^{1}There is an ongoing controversy over whether Moldovans are a subset of Romanians, or a distinct ethnic group. At the 2004 Moldovan Census, citizens could declare only one nationality. Consequently, one could not declare oneself both Moldovan and Romanian.

=== Separatist-controlled areas ===
==== 2015 census ====
According to the last census in Transnistria (October 2015), the population of the region was 475,373, a 14.47% decrease from the figure recorded at the 2004 census. By ethnic composition, the population of Transnistria was distributed as follows:

- Russians: 29.1%
- Moldovans: 28.6%
- Ukrainians: 22.9%
- Bulgarians: 2.4%
- Gagauz: 1.1%
- Belarusians: 0.5%
- Transnistrians: 0.2%
- Others: 1.4%

Around 14% did not declare any ethnicity. For the first time, the population had the option to identify as "Transnistrian".

In 2020, in Transnistria, 34.2% of the kindergarten students were ethnic Moldovans, while 28% were ethnic Ukrainians.

==== 2004 census ====
	Population	Mold.	Russians	Ukrainians	Gagauzes	Bulg.	Gyps.	Jews	Poles	Belor.	Germ.	Armen.	others, non-decl.
Tiraspol	158,069	23,790 15.05%	65,928 41.71%	52,278 33.07%	1,988 1.26%	2,450 1.55%	116 0.07%	573 0.36%	324 0.20%	1,712 1.08%	701 0.44%	360 0.23%	7,849 4.97%
Camenca District	27,284	13,048 47.82%	1,880 6.89%	11,610 42.55%	43 0.16%	59 0.22%	9 0.03%	10 0.04%	447 1.64%	85 0.31%	26 0.10%	16 0.06%	51 0.19%
Rîbnița District	82,699	24,729 29.90%	14,237 17.22%	37,554 45.41%	149 0.18%	309 0.37%	51 0.06%	177 0.21%	528 0.64%	412 0.50%	150 0.18%	81 0.10%	4,322 5.23%
Dubăsari District	36,734	18,080 49.22%	7,125 19.40%	10,594 28.84%	92 0.25%	134 0.36%	46 0.13%	46 0.13%	53 0.14%	185 0.50%	63 0.17%	126 0.34%	190 0.52%
Grigoriopol District	48,000	31,118 64.83%	7,332 15.28%	8,333 17.36%	123 0.26%	240 0.50%	13 0.03%	26 0.05%	100 0.21%	187 0.39%	327 0.68%	62 0.13%	139 0.29%
Slobozia District	86,742	36,651 42.25%	20,636 23.79%	19,872 22.91%	512 0.59%	7,323 8.44%	133 0.15%	35 0.04%	137 0.16%	475 0.55%	496 0.57%	140 0.16	332 0.38%
Subtotal Transnistria	439,528	147,416 33.54%	117,138 26.65%	140,241 31.91%	2,907 0.66%	10,515 2.39%	368 0.08%	867 0.20%	1,589 0.36%	3,056 0.70%	1,763 0.40%	785 0.18%	12,883 2.93%
Bender (w/o Protegailovca)	97,027	24,374 25.12%	41,949 43.23%	17,348 17.88%	1,066 1.10%	3,001 3.09%	132 0.14%	383 0.39%	190 0.21%	713 0.73%	258 0.27%	173 0.18%	7,440 7.67%
Proteagailovca	3,142	756–761 24.12%	1,482 47.17%	658 20.94%	25 0.80%	163 5.19%	0–5 0.06%	2 0.06%	0–12 0.19%	19 0.60%	6 0.19%	0–16 0.25%	0–31 0.48%
Gîsca	4,841	819–824 16.98%	2,956 61.06%	719 14.85%	91 1.88%	168 3.47%	0–5 0.04%	7 0.14%	0–12 0.12%	8 0.17%	22 0.45%	0–16 0.17%	13–44 0.60%
Chițcani (incl. Merenești and Zahorna)	~9,000	~3,100 ~35%	~4,800 ~53%	~900 ~10%	N/A	N/A	N/A	N/A	N/A	N/A	N/A	N/A	~200 ~2%
Cremenciug	1,094	465 42.50%	353 32.27%	203 18.56%	7 0.64%	11 1.01%	2 0.18%	– -	– -	15 1.37%	22 2.01%	6 0.55%	10 0.91%
Roghi	715	~700 ~95%	N/A	N/A	N/A	N/A	N/A	N/A	N/A	N/A	N/A	N/A	~15 ~5%
Subotal other localities	115,819	30,219 26.09%	51,540 44.50%	19,828 17.12%	1,189 1.03%	3,343 2.89%	139 0.12%	392 0.34%	202 0.17%	755 0.65%	308 0.27%	195 0.17%	7,709 6.66%
Total Tiraspol-controlled areas	555,347	177,635 31.99%	168,678 30.37%	160,069 28.82%	4,096 0.74%	13,858 2.50%	507 0.09%	1,259 0.23%	1,791 0.32%	3,811 0.69%	2,071 0.37%	980 0.18%	20,592 3.71%

Notes:
- The exact numbers in the above table are taken from the data published by the Transnistrian breakaway authorities after the 2004 Census in Transnistria, except the population of Roghi, which was taken from website of the Dubăsari District of Transnistria.
- The number of inhabitants of Slobozia District + that of the commune Chițcani was given by Transnistrian authorities as 95,742. Other sources indicate ~9,000 for Chițcani. In this table it is assumed there are 9,000 inhabitants in Chițcani, and 86,742 in Slobozia District. Should the exact data of the census for Chițcani be available, the entries in the lines of Slobozia District and of Chițcani should be corrected accordingly.
- Transnistrian authorities have published the ethnic composition for the combined population of the Dubăsari District and the village of Roghi in Molovata Nouă commune. Other sources indicate that the latter is almost entirely Moldovan. In this table it is assumed that of the 715 inhabitants of this village, 700 are Moldovan and 15 are others. Should the exact ethnicity data of the census for Roghi be available, the entries for ethnicities in the lines of Dubăsari District and of Roghi should be corrected accordingly.
- Percentages are calculated from the absolute numbers

== Languages ==
Romanian is the official language of Moldova. However, many speakers use the term Moldovan to describe the language they speak, even though its literary standard is virtually identical to Romanian. Officially since 1990, it is written in the Latin alphabet.

=== Native language ===
Mother Tongues in Censuses (%)
	% 2004	Speakers 2014	% 2014	Speakers 2024	% 2024
Moldovan	60.2	1,441,478	55.53	1,159,857	48.14
Romanian	16.6	586,838	22.61	765,838	31.79
Russian	11.3	250,478	9.65	280,050	11.62
Gagauzian	4.1	101,698	3.92	87,407	3.63
Ukrainian	5.5	102,230	3.94	71,878	2.98
Bulgarian	1.6	38,103	1.47	28,839	1.20
Romani	0.6	6,882	0.26	7,640	0.31
Other languages	0.6	3,933	0.15	6,116	0.25
Undeclared	0.1	64,131	2.47	1,582	0.06
*The table excludes the population who did not declare a mother tongue.

Census statistics excludes the break-away region of Transnistria.

Of the total population that declared its mother tongue (limba maternă; distinct from the usually spoken language) in the 2024 Moldovan census, 49.2% declared Moldovan and 31.3% declared Romanian, with both adding up to 80.5%. The share of the population that declared Romanian as its mother tongue increased by 8.1% compared to the 2014 census (23.2%), and the share that declared Moldovan decreased by 7.8% (56.9% in the 2014 census). Among other languages declared as mother tongues, Russian stood out with 11.1% of the population, followed by Gagauz with 3.8%, Ukrainian with 2.9%, Bulgarian with 1.2%, Romani/Gypsy with 0.3% and other languages with 0.2%.

=== First language in daily use (2014 and 2024 censuses) ===
According to the 2014 census, 2,720,377 answered to the question on "language usually used for communication". 2,138,964 people or 78.63% of the inhabitants of Moldova (proper) have Moldovan/Romanian as first language, of which 1,486,570 (53%) declared it Moldovan and 652,394 (23.3%) declared it Romanian. 394,133 people or 14.1% have Russian as language of daily use, 73.802 or 2.6% – Ukrainian, 74.167 or 2.6% – Gagauz, 26,577 or 0.9% – Bulgarian, and 12,734 or 0.5% – another language. By contrast, 46.0% declared their usually spoken language to be Moldovan and 33.2% declared it to be Romanian in 2024. In the 2024 Moldovan census, the percentage of speakers of Russian as their usually spoken language was 15.3%, with other minority languages' share being lower: 2.3% for Gagauz, 2% for Ukrainian, 0.8% for Bulgarian, 0.3% for Romani and 0.2% for other languages.

=== First language in daily use (2004 census) ===
Ethnic group \ First language	Moldovan *	Romanian	Russian	Ukrainian	Gagauzian	Bulgarian	other language	did non declare	Total
Moldovans	1,949,318	475,126	128,372	9,170	799	1,113	951	–	2,564,849
Romanians	1,597	69,936	1,537	81	5	4	116	–	73,276
Russians	8,852	2,805	187,526	1,224	329	344	138	–	201,218
Ukrainians	17,491	4,158	141,206	118,699	427	294	131	–	282,406
Gagauzians	2,756	609	40,445	413	102,395	821	61	–	147,500
Bulgarians	4,652	1,046	23,259	188	673	35,808	36	–	65,662
other ethnic groups	3,828	1,133	18,610	339	262	181	9,856	192	34,401
did non declare	46	1	35	–	–	–	29	13,909	14,020
Total by language of first use	1,988,540; 58.77%	554,814; 16.4%	540,990; 15.99%	130,114; 3.85%	104,890; 3.10%	38,565; 1.14%	11,318; 0.34%	14,101; 0.41%	3,383,332; 100%
* Moldovan language is one of the names used in the Republic of Moldova for the Romanian language.

=== Usage of own language by the ethnic groups of Moldova (2004 census) ===
ethnic group	own language	Moldovan and Romanian	Russian
Moldovans	94.52%	–	5%
Romanians	97.62%	–	2.1%
Russians	93.20%	5.79%	–
Ukrainians	42.03%	7.66%	50.00%
Gagauzians	69.42%	2.28%	27.42%
Bulgarians	54.53%	8.68%	35.42%
others	up to 28.65%	14.42%	54.10%

==== Urban areas ====
ethnic group	own language	Moldovan and Romanian	Russian
Moldovans	86.71%	–	13.07%
Romanians	96.88%	–	2.85%
Russians	95.85%	3.82%	–
Ukrainians	13.06%	6.56%	80.19%
Gagauzians	40.10%	2.19%	57.23%
Bulgarians	36.81%	7.93%	54.45%
others	up to 28.11%	8.35%	62.05%

==== Rural areas ====
ethnic group	own language	Moldovan and Romanian	Russian
Moldovans	98.24%	–	1.17%
Romanians	98.76%	–	0.94%
Russians	80.52%	15.25%	–
Ukrainians	72.99%	8.85%	17.74%
Gagauzians	86.16%	2.33%	10.40%
Bulgarians	68.95%	9.29%	19.95%
others	up to 30.34%	33.39%	29.25%

=== Soviet era data ===
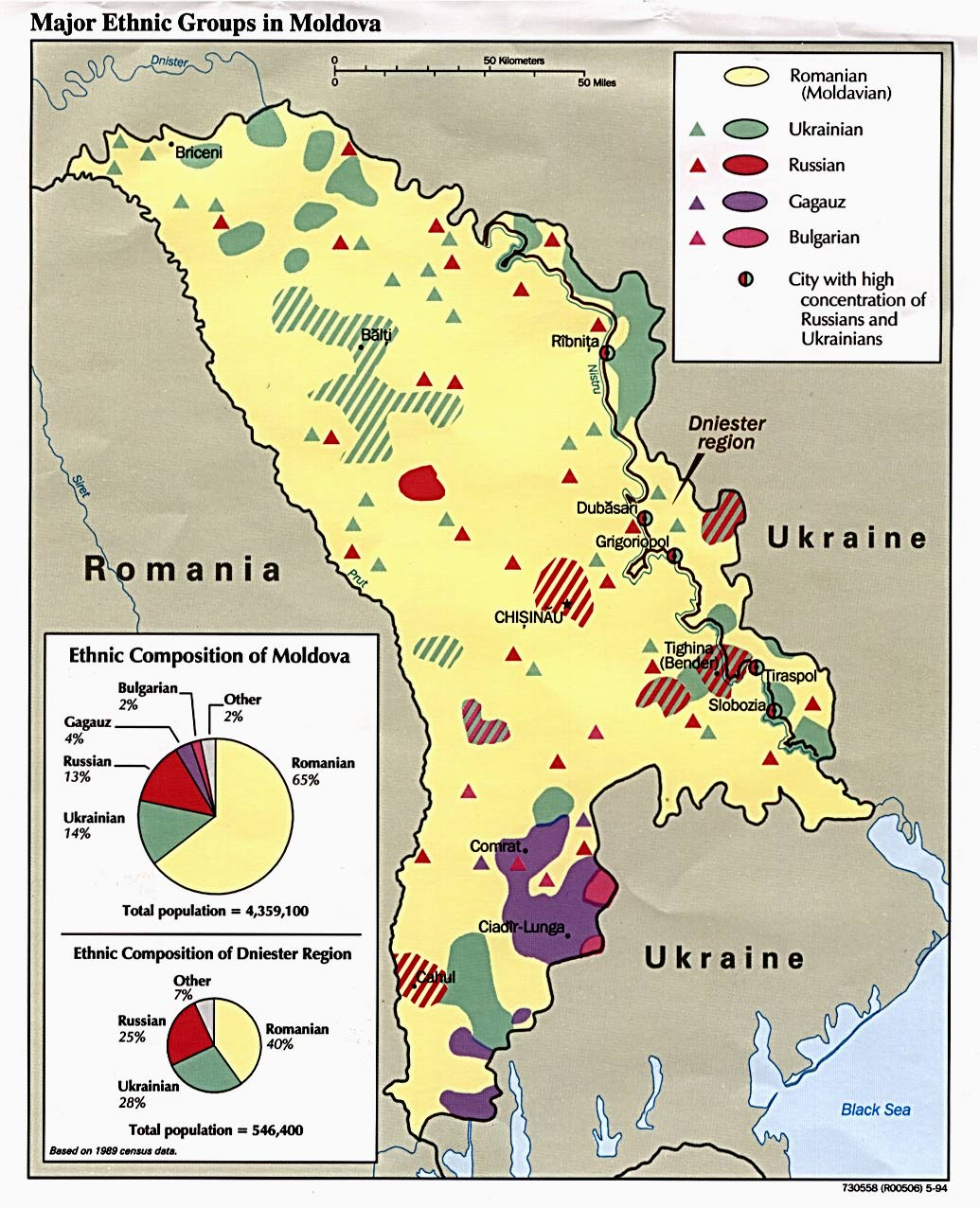
Ethnic map of Moldova (1989 data)

In the Soviet census of 1989 members of most of the ethnic groups in Moldavian SSR claimed the language of their ethnicity as their mother tongue: Moldovans (95%), Ukrainians (62%), Russians (99%), Gagauz (91%), Bulgarians (79%), and Gipsies (82%). The exceptions were Jews (26% citing Yiddish), Belarusians (43%), Germans (31%), and Poles (10%).

In the Soviet census of 1989, 62% of the total population claimed Moldovan as their native language. Only 4% of the entire population claimed Moldovan as a second language.

In 1979, Russian was claimed as a native language by a large proportion of Jews (66%) and Belarusians (62%), and by a significant proportion of Ukrainians (30%). Proportions of other ethnicities naming Russian as a native language ranged from 17% of Bulgarians to 3% of Moldovans (Russian was more spoken by urban Moldovans than by rural Moldovans). Russian was claimed as a second language by a sizeable proportion of all ethnicities: Moldovans (46%), Ukrainians (43%), Gagauz (68%), Jews (30%), Bulgarians (67%), Belarusians (34%), Germans (53%), Roma (36%), and Poles (24%).

== Religion ==
=== 2014–2024 censuses ===
Population of Moldova according to religious group (excluding Administrative-Territorial Units of the Left Bank of the Nistru / Transnistria)
Religious group	census 2014		census 2024	
Religious group	Number	%	Number	%
Eastern Orthodoxy	2,350,041	90.53	2,271,105	94.27
Baptist	24,426	0.94	26,226	1.09
Jehovah's Witnesses	16,776	0.64	16,505	0.68
Pentecostal	9,504	0.37	12,606	0.52
Adventist	8,339	0.32	6,982	0.29
Evangelical	4,655	0.18	6,364	0.26
Old Believers	2,447	0.09	4,053	0.17
Catholic	2,527	0.10	2,586	0.11
Christianity (total)	2,418,715	93.18	2,346,427	97.39
Islam	1,798	0.07	3,138	0.13
Other	3,277	0.12	4,720	0.20
Agnostic / Atheist	5,800	0.22	16,768	0.69
No religion	286	0.01	20,051	0.83
Undeclared	165,895	6.39	18,103	0.75
Total	2,595,771		2,409,207	
Source: National Bureau of Statistics

=== 2004 census ===
According to the 2004 census, the population of Moldova had the following religious composition (excluding Administrative-Territorial Units of the Left Bank of the Nistru / Transnistria):

Religion	Adherents	% of total
Eastern Orthodox Christians	3,158,015	93.3%
Newer Protestant faiths Baptists Seventh-day Adventists Pentecostal Christians of Evangelical Faith ^{a}	32,754; 13,503; 9,179; 5,075	1.79% 0.97% 0.40% 0.27% 0.15%
Traditional Protestant Confessional Evangelicals Reformed Evangelical Synod-Presbyterians	1,429; 1,190; 3,596	0.19% 0.04% 0.04% 0.11%
Old-Rite Christians ^{b}	5,094	0.15%
Roman Catholics	4,645	0.14%
Other religions	29,813	0.88%
Non-religious	33,207	0.98%
Atheists	12,724	0.38%

Notes: 75,727 (2.24% of population) did not answer that question.
^{a} Known as Creștini după Evanghelie, Pentecostal group
^{b} Traditionally Orthodox Lipovans

History

In 1940–1941, and 1944–1991, the Soviet government strictly limited the activities of the Orthodox Church (and all religions) and at times sought to exploit it, with the ultimate goal of abolishing it and all religious activity altogether. Most Orthodox churches and monasteries in Moldova were demolished or converted to other uses, such as administrative buildings or warehouses, and clergy were sometimes punished for leading services. Still, many believers continued to practice their faith.

People in the independent Moldova have much greater religious freedom than they did in Soviet times. Legislation passed in 1992 guarantees religious freedom, but requires all religious groups to be officially recognized by the government.

Orthodox Christians

In 1991, Moldova had 853 Orthodox churches and eleven Orthodox monasteries (four for monks and seven for nuns). In 1992 construction or restoration of 221 churches was underway, but clergy remained in short supply. As of 2004, Christian Orthodox constitute the vast majority of the population in all districts of Moldova.

In the interwar period, the vast majority of ethnic Moldovans belonged to the Romanian Orthodox Church (Bucharest Patriarchate), but today both Romanian and Russian Orthodox Church (Moscow Patriarchate) have jurisdiction in Moldova, with the latter having more parishes. According to the local needs, liturgy is performed in Romanian, Russian, and Turkic (Gagauz). After the revival of religious activity in the last 20 years, a minority of the clergy and the faithful wanted to return to the Bucharest Patriarchate (Metropolis of Bessarabia). Because higher-level church authorities were unable to resolve the matter, Moldova now has two episcopates, one for each patriarchate. After the Soviet occupation in 1940, the Metropolis was downgraded to a Bishopric. In late 1992, the Patriarch of Moscow and All Russia issued a decree upgrading its eparchy of Chișinău and Moldova to a Metropolis.

Greek Catholics

Moldova also has a Greek Catholic minority, mainly among ethnic Ukrainians, although the Soviet government declared the Greek Catholic Churches illegal in 1946 and forcibly united them with the Russian Orthodox Church. However, the Greek Catholic Churches had survived underground until the dissolution of the Soviet Union.

Roman Catholics

Half of Moldova's Roman Catholics are in Chișinău, and 1/5 in Bălți.

Old Believers

In addition, the Old Russian Orthodox Church (Old Believers) had fourteen churches and one monastery in Moldova in 1991.

Half of Moldova's Old Believers are in Florești district, and 1/5 in Sîngerei district.

Judaism

Despite the Soviet government's suppression and harassment, Moldova's practicing Jews managed to retain their religious identity. About a dozen Jewish newspapers were started in the early 1990s, and religious leaders opened a synagogue in Chișinău; there were six Jewish communities of worship throughout the country. In addition, Moldova's government created the Department of Jewish Studies at Chișinău State University, mandated the opening of a Jewish high school in Chișinău, and introduced classes in Judaism in high schools in several cities. The government also provides financial support to the Society for Jewish Culture.

Protestants

There are around 65,000 Protestants of all sects in Moldova today. There are more than 1,000 Baptists in the cities of Chișinău and Bălți, in Cahul, Fălești, Hîncești, Sîngerei, Ștefan Vodă, and Ungheni districts, and in Găgăuzia. There are more than 1,000 Seventh-day Adventists in Cahul, Hîncești and Sîngerei districts, and in Găgăuzia, there are more than 1,000 Pentecostals in Chișinău and in Briceni district. There are more than 1,000 members of Brethren assemblies only in Chișinău. There are more than 1,000 Evangelical Synod-Presbyterians only in Chișinău.

Others

Other religious denominations in Moldova include:

- Armenian Apostolic Church
- Molokans (a Russian Orthodox sect).
- Islam

== Immigration ==
Foreign citizens (according to the Office of Migration and Asylum, including Transnistria)
Country	2017	2018	2019	2020	2021	2022	2023	2024
Ukraine	6959	6786	6834	6525	6576	6692	6931	6749
Russia	5574	5742	5953	5360	5125	5365	6012	6210
Turkey	902	943	1292	990	1281	1476	1123	1379
India	228	256	520	287	810	938	1223	1377
(European Union) Romania	1016	988	1037	1030	1190	1206	1187	1265
Israel	2067	2200	1929	1590	1219	978	754	525
(European Union) Italy	488	501	535	464	497	540	511	515
Azerbaijan	312	371	458	450	416	365	373	486
Uzbekistan	151	164	327	196	246	273	340	429
Belarus	299	327	309	233	303	348	373	381
Nepal	–	–	–	13	16	87	253	372
Kazakhstan	199	202	220	216	221	227	242	269
United States	426	433	507	391	305	321	275	247
Armenia	213	211	229	222	229	225	245	253
(European Union) Germany	129	131	123	104	125	141	146	165
Tajikistan	–	–	–	112	136	163	167	158
Georgia	110	98	110	111	111	98	110	125
Cameroon	–	–	–	15	8	15	118	120
Syria	134	140	134	123	131	132	118	93
Others	1573	3271	3313	1358	1443	1617	1762	1918
Total	22,508	22,764	23,830	21,830	21,933	22,705	23,763	24,437

=== Net Migration ===
Net migration in Moldova, 2014–2024
Year	Immigrants	Emigrants	Net migration
2014	98,731	122,955	-24,224
2015	105,834	127,277	-21,443
2016	107,303	153,405	-46,102
2017	107,580	158,259	-50,679
2018	116,739	158,788	-42,049
2019	116,196	153,289	-37,093
2020	65,167	72,372	-7,205
2021	68,356	113,769	-45,413
2022	177,875	241,448	-63,573
2023	97,517	130,084	-32,567
2024	105,804	123,406	-17,602

== Secondary demographic indices ==
Average age of the population (years) on the fifth
The year	1992	1995	growth	2000	growth	2005	growth	2010	growth	2015	growth
Years	32,0	32,4	+0.4	33,4	+1.0	34,9	+1.5	36,2	+1.3	37,5	+1.3

=== Life expectancy at birth ===
Life expectancy in Moldova since 1950

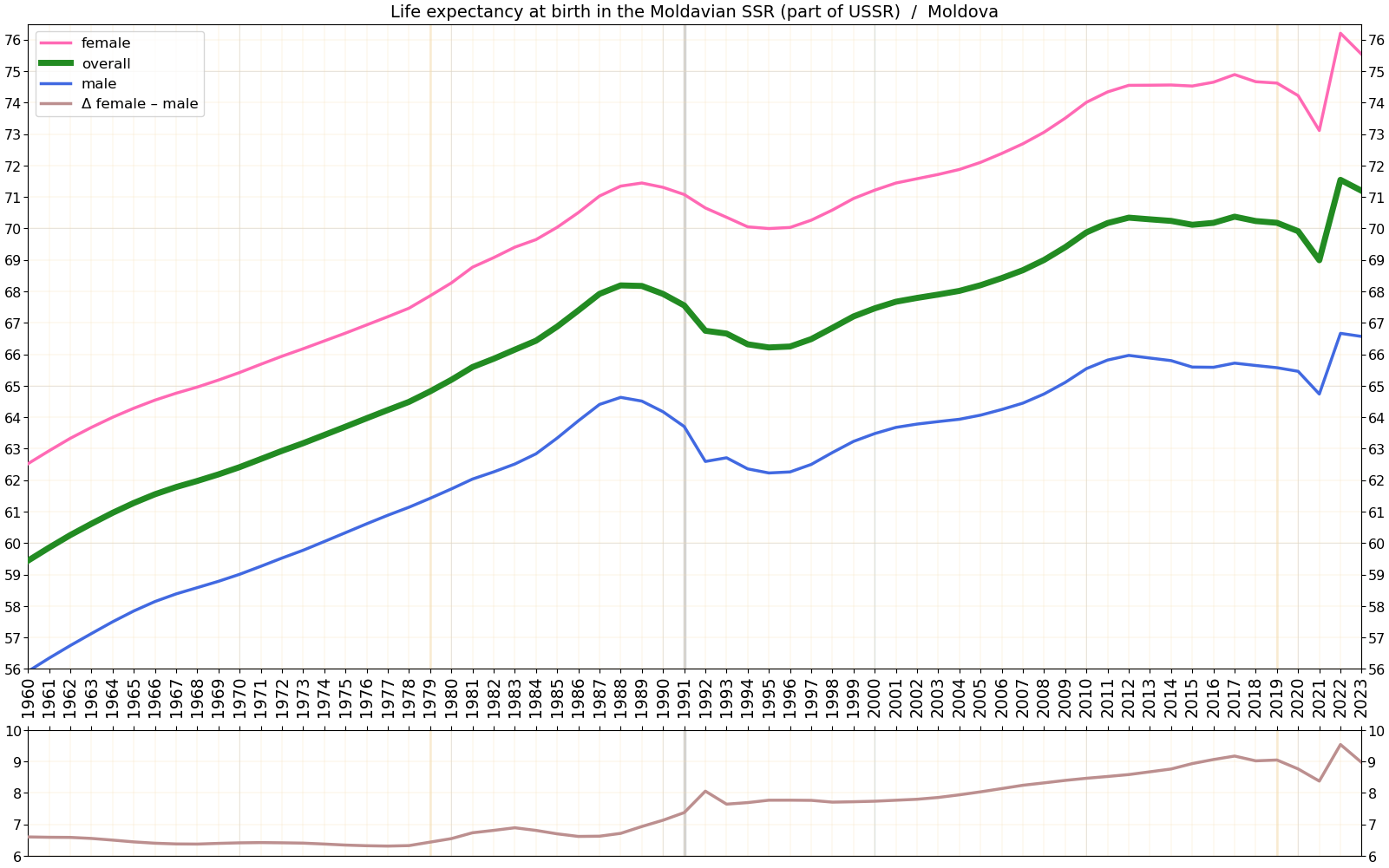
Life expectancy in Moldova since 1960 by gender

Since 2000, there has been a continuous increase in life expectancy, except for 2005, a year in which there was a high level of general and infant mortality. In 2013, this indicator recorded the maximum value of the given period – 71.85 years, including men – 68.1 and women – 75.5 years. The significant increase in life expectancy was influenced by the decrease in the overall mortality rate to 10.7 deaths per 1000 inhabitants, and the infant death rate, which constituted 9.4 deaths under one year per 1,000 live births.

Average life expectancy (years) based on sex after decades, five and a half years
The year	1960	1970	1980	1990	1995	2000	2005	2010	2015	2016
Women:	▲69,8	▲72,1	▼68,8	▲71,9	▼69,7	▲71,2	▲71,7	▲73,4	▲75,5	▲76,1
Average time:	▲68,1	▲69,4	▼65,6	▲68,0	▼65,8	▲67,6	▲67,9	▲69,1	▲71,5	▲72,2
Men:	▲65,6	▲66,3	▼62,4	▲63,9	▼61,8	▲63,9	▼63,8	▲65,0	▲67,5	▲68,1

=== Population by sex ===
Gender composition of the population, after decades
Year	1970	1980	1990	2000	2010	2015
Men	46,76%	47,25%	47,64%	47,87%	48,08%	48,10%
Women	53,24%	52,75%	52,36%	52,13%	51,92%	51,90%
Men per 1.000 women	878	896	910	918	926	927

=== Infant mortality ===
Children under 1 year old in 1,000 newborns:

The Year	1980	1985	1990	1995	2000	2005	2010	2015	2017
Children	▼35,0	▼30,9	▼19,0	▲21,2	▼18,3	▼12,4	▼11,7	▼9,7	▼9,4

Marriage
Year	Number marriages	per 1000 inhabitants	Number divorce	per 1000 inhabitants
1980	46.083	11,5	11.273	2,8
1985	40.901	▼9,7	11.176	▼2,7
1990	40.809	▼9,4	13.135	▲3,0
1995	32.775	▼7,5	14.617	▲3,4
2000	21.684	▼6,0	9.707	▼2,7
2005	27.187	▲7,6	14.521	▲4,0
2010	26.483	▼7,4	11.504	▼3,2
2011	25.900	▼7,3	11.120	▼3,1
2012	24.262	▼6,8	10.637	▼3,0
2013	24.449	▲6,9	10.775	3,0
2014	25.624	▲7,2	11.130	▲3,1
2015	24.709	▼6,9	11.199	3,1
2016	21.992	▼6,2	10.605	▼3,0

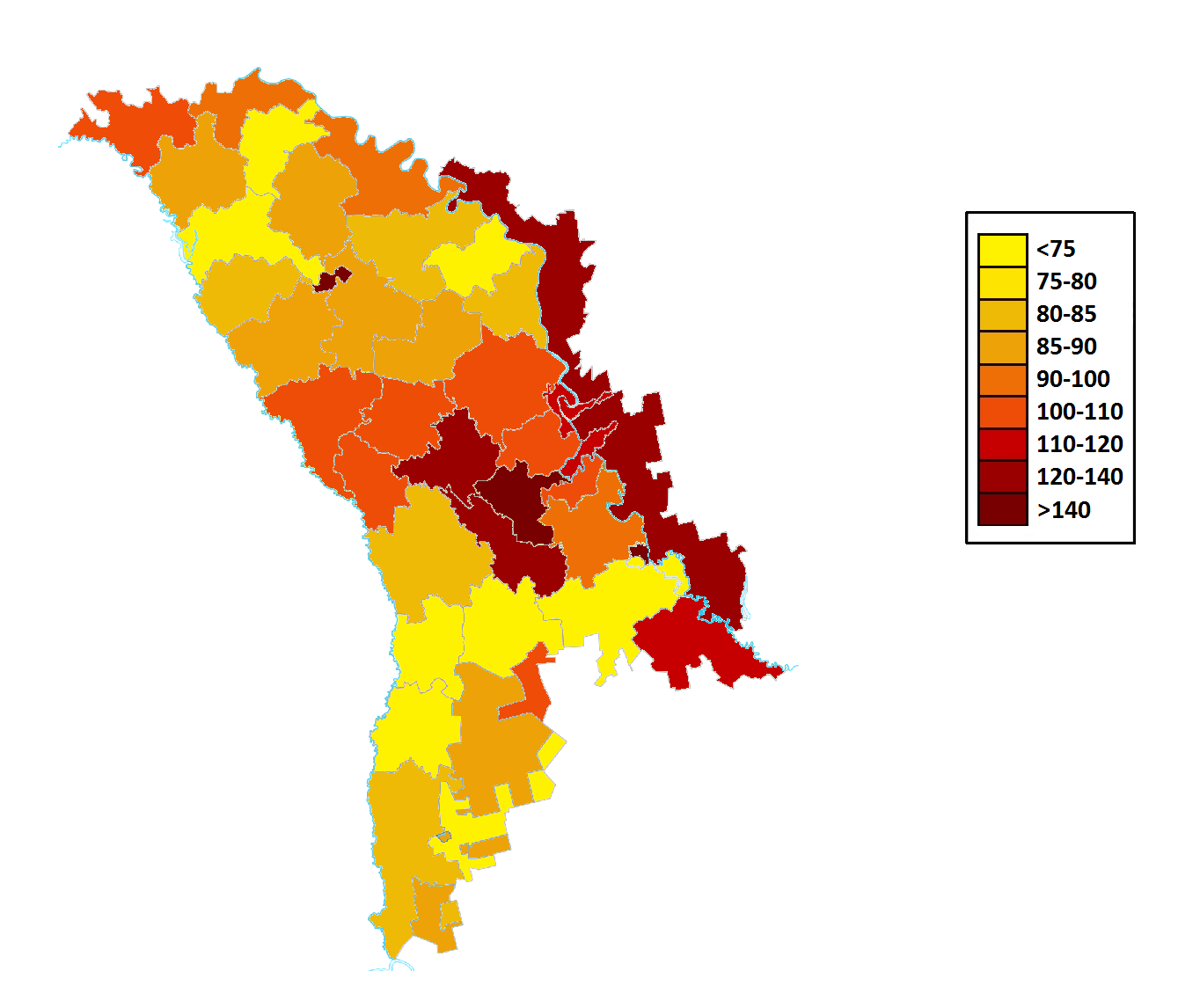
Density of population per km^{2}, depending on administrative unit

Urban and rural population
Year	Urban population	%	Rural population	%
2014	▲901.694	34,74	▼1.694.077	65,26
2024	▲1.118.967	46,45	▼1.290.240	53,55

== See also ==
- Emigration from Moldova
- Ageing of Europe
- Poles in Moldova
- Poles in Transnistria
