= Ioan Duma =

Ioan Duma (November 5, 1896 — July 16, 1981) was a Romanian cleric and a titular bishop of the Roman Catholic Church. Born in Valea Mare, Bacău County, he studied at the Franciscan seminary in Hălăucești and in Rome. Ordained there in 1924, he returned to Romania to serve in the parishes at Săbăoani and Hălăucești, also teaching at the seminary in the latter place, and officiating at Franciscan convents in Transylvania in 1944. In 1948, nuncio Gerald Patrick O'Hara consecrated him bishop in secret, without the approval of the new communist authorities. For the next two years, he undertook activities against the regime, and was arrested in 1951 by the Securitate secret police. Sentenced to four years' imprisonment for "spying on behalf of the Vatican", he was released when his term expired in 1955 and forced to live and work as a parish priest first in Iași, then in Mihail Kogălniceanu, Constanța County. In 1957, he was nearly arrested again, an order to the effect having been signed by Interior Minister Alexandru Drăghici. A year later, he was investigated after attending his mother's funeral near his native village, his personal papers confiscated. In 1960, wishing to isolate and watch him more closely, the Securitate sent him to live at Târgu Jiu. In 1971, he was allowed to visit Pope Paul VI in Rome. He was no longer under supervision after 1975, as the Securitate considered the aged and ill prelate no longer posed a threat. He died in Târgu Jiu and was buried in Valea Mare.
