= Catholic Diocese of Chișinău =

Catholic diocese in Moldova

Coordinates: 47.0290°N 28.8292°E

Diocese of Chişinău Dioecesis Chisinauensis Episcopia Chişinăului

Catholic
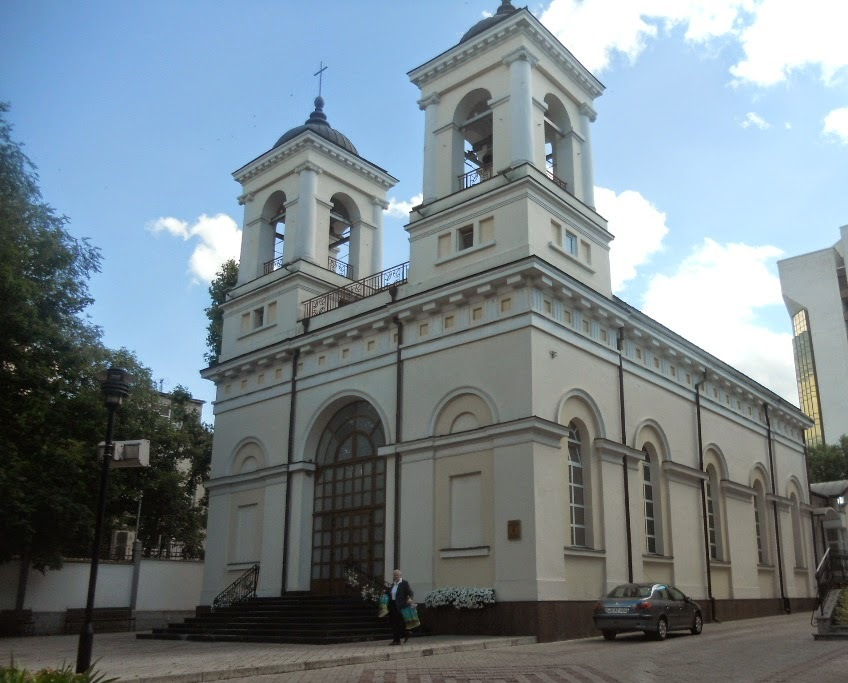
- Cathedral of Divine Providence, Chişinău, Moldova

Location
- Country: Moldova
- Metropolitan: Immediately subject to the Holy See

Statistics
- Area: 33,000 km^{2} (13,000 sq mi)
- Population: Total; Catholics: (as of 2013); 3,567,000; 20,000 (0.5%)

Information
- Denomination: Roman Catholic
- Sui iuris church: Latin Church
- Rite: Roman Rite
- Established: 28 October 1993 (As Apostolic Administration of Moldova); 27 October 2001 (As Diocese of Chişinău)
- Cathedral: Cathedral of Divine Providence in Chișinău

Current leadership
- Pope: Leo XIV
- Bishop: Anton Coșa

Website
- Website of the Diocese

The Diocese of Chișinău (in Latin: Dioecesis Chisinauensis, in Romanian: Dieceza Chișinăului) is a Latin Church ecclesiastical territory or diocese of the Catholic Church covering all of Moldova and the territory of the self-proclaimed state of Transnistria.

It is exempt, meaning that it is directly subordinate to the Holy See, not part of any ecclesiastical province with a metropolitan bishop.

== History ==
On 28 October 1993, it was established as the Apostolic Administration of Moldova (a missionary pre-diocesan jurisdiction), on territories split off from the Diocese of Iași (in Romania) and the Diocese of Tiraspol (later suppressed).

On 27 October 2001, it was promoted and renamed after its see (the national capital) as Diocese of Chișinău, to which the apostolic administrator was appointed as first residential bishop.

== Cathedral ==
The Cathedral of Chișinău is dedicated to the Divine Providence.

== Ordinaries ==
(all Roman Rite)

Apostolic administrator of Moldova (1993–2001)

- October 28, 1993 – October 27, 2001 : Anton Coşa, Titular Bishop of Pesto (see) (1999.10.30 – 2001.10.27)

Exempt Bishop of Chișinău (2001– )

- since October 27, 2001 : Anton Coşa

== See also ==
- Catholic Church in Moldova
