= Faraoani =

- Commune
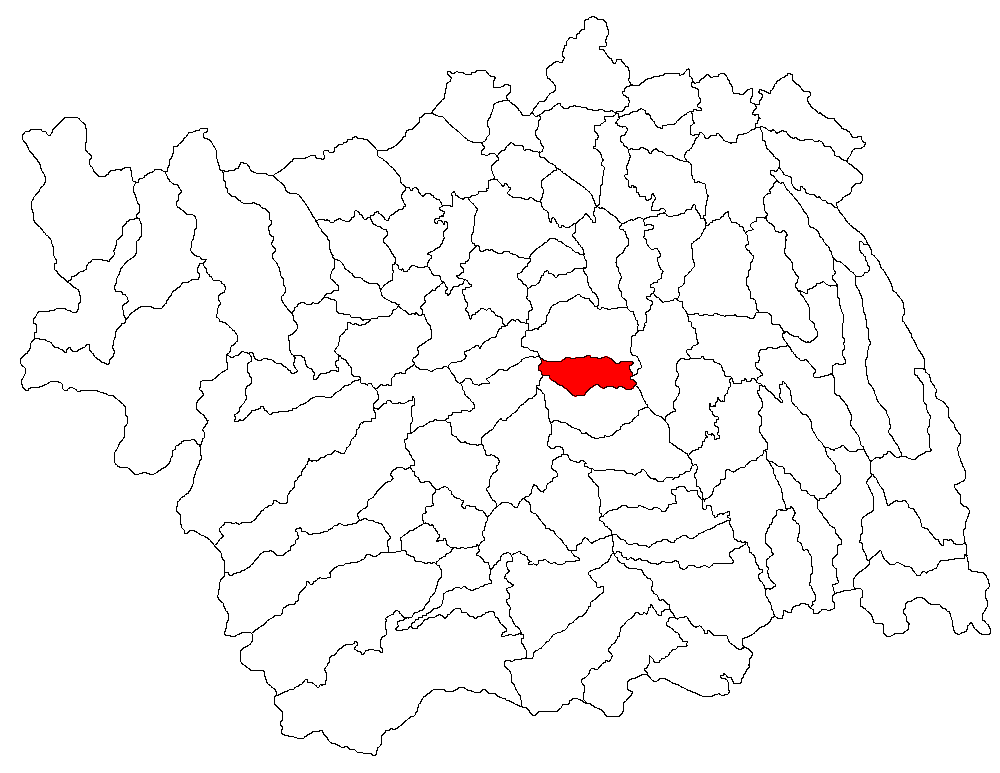
- Location in Bacău County

- Location in Romania
- Coordinates: 46°26′N 26°54′E
- Country: Romania
- County: Bacău
- Area: 38.92 km^{2} (15.03 sq mi)
- Elevation: 216 m (709 ft)
- Population (2021-12-01): 5,200
  - Density: 130/km^{2} (350/sq mi)
- Time zone: EET/EEST (UTC+2/+3)
- Postal code: 607170
- Area code: (+40) 0234
- Vehicle reg.: BC
- Website: www.comunafaraoani.ro

Faraoani (Hungarian: Forrófalva) is a commune in Bacău County, Western Moldavia, Romania. It is composed of two villages, Faraoani and Valea Mare (Nagypatak).

== Geography ==
The commune is situated on the Moldavian Plateau, at an altitude of 216 m (709 ft), on the right bank of the Siret River. It is located in the central part of Bacău County, 16 km (9.9 mi) south of the county seat, Bacău.

Faraoani is crossed by national road DN2 (part of European route E85). On the eastern side of the commune is the Faraoani railway station, serving the CFR Main Line 500 that runs from Bucharest to Focșani, Bacău, and on north to the Ukraininan border.

== Demographics ==
At the 2002 census, Faraoani had 5,176 inhabitants; of those, 99.1% were ethnic Romanians and 0.8% Csángós. Moreover, 99.4% were Roman Catholic and 0.6% Romanian Orthodox. At the 2011 census, there were 3,932 inhabitants, of which 93.54% were Romanians, 1.73% Hungarians, and 1.55% Csángós. At the 2021 census, the commune had a population of 5,200; of those, 94.27% were Romanians.

== Natives ==
- Anton Coșa (born 1961), cleric, bishop of the Roman Catholic Diocese of Chișinău in Moldova
- Ioan Duma (1896—1981), cleric and a titular bishop of the Roman Catholic Church
