= Emigration from Moldova =

Emigration from Moldova is a mass phenomenon, having a significant impact on the country's demographics and economy.

== Overview ==
Confronted with economic instability, collapsing incomes, and rapidly rising unemployment that accompanied the fall of the Soviet Union, people began emigrating from Moldova on a large scale in the first half of the 1990s, with a sharp population drop in 1997. The Information and Security Service of the Republic of Moldova has estimated that over 1,000,000 Moldovan citizens (over 25% of a population of some 3.6 million) are working abroad. Russia (especially the Moscow region), Italy, Ukraine, Romania, France, Portugal, Spain, Greece, Turkey, and Israel are the main destinations. Mass emigration resulted in a sharp population drop in 2014, and in just 30 years, Moldova's population was halved, going from 4.3 million in 1996 down to 2.3 million in 2025. These migration flows resulted in the Moldovan diaspora.

Due to the clandestine nature of these migration flows, however, no official statistics exist. Some 500,000 Moldovans are thought to be working in Russia, mainly in construction. Another estimate puts the number of Moldovans in Italy at 500,000. Moldovan citizens are drawn toward countries that speak their language or a similar one, such as Romanians to Romance-speaking countries, Russians and Ukrainians to Russia or Ukraine, or the Turkic-speaking Gagauz to Turkey; Moldovans in Romania are believed to number 285,000.

Remittances from Moldovans abroad account for almost 16,1% of Moldova's GDP, the twelfth-highest percentage in the world.

Emigration in 2020:

- Age 20-29 17,172
- Age 30-39 15,683
- Age 40-49 10,647
- Age 50-59 6,312
- Age 60+ 2,031

In 2023 70% of parents in Moldova see their children future outside of the country, worryingly where they are potential victims of fraud and exploitation as limited travel entry to another country does not give the right to work in that overseas country.

== See also ==
- Immigration to Moldova
- Moldovan diaspora
- Euro-orphans
