= Anton Coșa =

Romanian cleric

The Most Reverend Anton Coșa
- Bishop of Chișinău
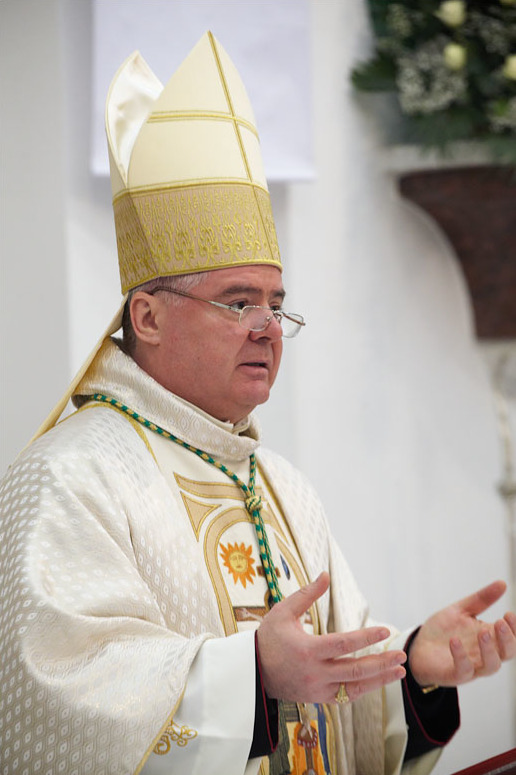
- Coșa in 2012
- Church: Roman Catholic Church
- Diocese: Chișinău
- See: Chișinău
- Appointed: 27 October 2001
- Installed: 8 December 2001
- Previous posts: Apostolic Administrator of Moldova (1993–2001); Titular Bishop of Pesto (1999–2001)

Orders
- Ordination: 25 June 1989 by Ioan Robu
- Consecration: 6 January 2000 by Pope John Paul II

Personal details
- Born: 23 November 1961 (age 64) Faraoani, Bacău Region, Romanian People's Republic
- Education: Theological Institute of Iași
- Motto: Omnia in Christo
- Coat of arms

Anton Coșa (born November 23, 1961) is a Romanian cleric, bishop of the Roman Catholic Diocese of Chișinău in Moldova.

== Early life ==
Anton Coșa was born on November 23, 1961, in a family of farmers, in the village of Valea Mare in the Faraoani commune, Bacău County. His family also gave two other priest brothers, Fr. Eduard Coșa from Bacău and Fr. Francisc Coșa from Bucharest. He attended primary school in his native village, and then high school in Hemeiuș commune in Bacău County.

== Biography ==
In 1989, he graduated from the Roman Catholic Theological Institute of Iași, and that June was ordained a priest by Bucharest Archbishop Ioan Robu, for the Iași Diocese. From 1989 to 1990, he was the assistant priest at Roman, and from 1990 to 1991 in Chișinău.

In 1991, he became the parish priest, remaining there until he was named Apostolic Administrator for Moldova in 1993. In October 1999, Pope John Paul II named him as the titular bishop of Paestum, later consecrating him at Saint Peter's Basilica the following January. He was named as the inaugural Bishop of Chișinău in 2001.
