= Cathedral of Divine Providence, Chișinău =

Coordinates: 47.0291°N 28.8291°E

Cathedral of Divine Providence
- Catedrala Romano-Catolică Providența Divină
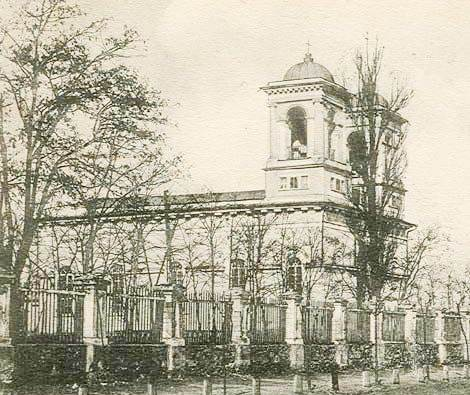
- Cathedral of Divine Providence
- Location: Chișinău
- Country: Moldova
- Denomination: Roman Catholic Church

History
- Founded: 1836

Architecture
- Architect: Avraam Melnikov
- Architectural type: Neoclassical architecture
- Completed: 1836

The Cathedral of Divine Providence (Romanian: Catedrala Romano-Catolică Providența Divină) is a religious building affiliated with the Catholic Church which is located in Chișinău, Moldova, and is the see of the Diocese of Chișinău.

The neoclassical church was built in 1836 by architect Avraam Melnikov, thanks to grants by Tsar Nicholas I of Russia. With the advent of Soviet power in 1944, all parish activities ceased, in 1963 the church was closed and the faithful were forced to go to a small chapel in the cemetery. In 1989, the building was returned to the parish. The church has been host since 1993 of the Apostolic Administration of Moldova, and since 2001 the newly established Diocese of Chișinău. A series of restoration works began in the spring of 2002 and ended in 2004.
