= Joseph Schubert (bishop) =

Romanian cleric and bishop

Most Rev. Joseph Schubert
- Apostolic Administrator
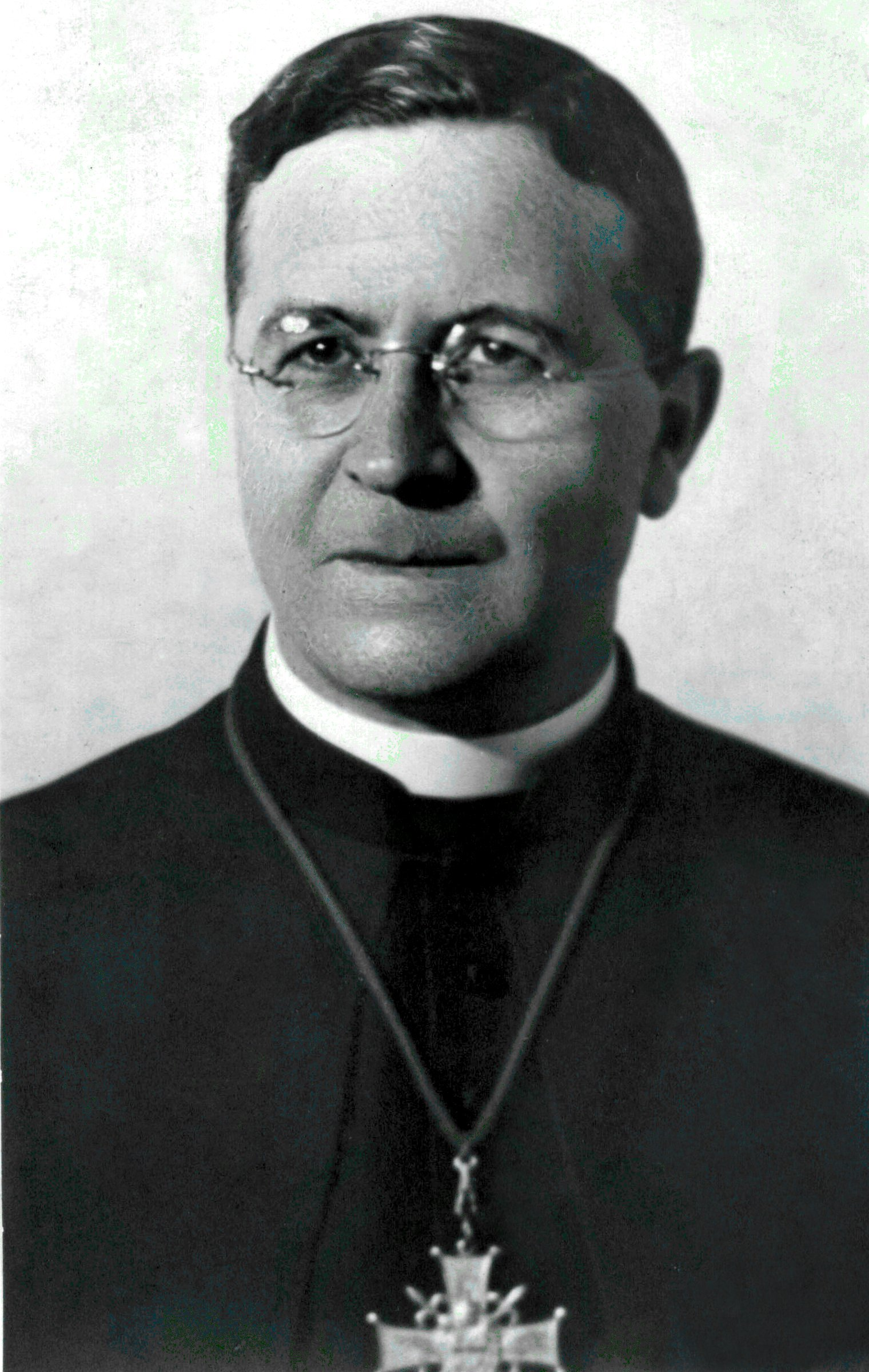
- Church: Catholic Church
- In office: 1949 — 1969

Orders
- Ordination: 15 July 1916
- Consecration: 30 June 1950 by Gerald Patrick O'Hara

Personal details
- Born: 24 June 1890 Bucharest, Romania
- Died: 4 April 1969 (aged 78) Munich, Germany

Joseph Schubert (24 June 1890 – 4 April 1969) was a Romanian cleric and a titular bishop of the Roman Catholic Church.

== Biography ==
Born to an ethnic German family in Bucharest, he studied theology at Innsbruck, becoming doctor of theology and being ordained a priest in 1916. After returning to Romania, he was assigned as parish priest in Caramurat, and in 1931 as a priest attached to the Bucharest cathedral. He also taught at the theological seminary in his native city. Following the 1949 arrest of Anton Durcovici by the authorities of the new Communist regime, he was made Apostolic Administrator of the Roman Catholic Archdiocese of Bucharest, being consecrated titular bishop of Ceramus by Gerald Patrick O'Hara in June 1950. Arrested in February 1951, he was sentenced to hard labor for life and freed in August 1964. Sighet prison was among the places where he was incarcerated. Forced to reside at first in Timişu de Sus, he was under constant surveillance from agents of the Religious Affairs Department. In January 1969 he was allowed to emigrate to Western Europe, meeting Pope Paul VI the following month and dying in Munich in April.

It was Schubert who consecrated Alexandru Todea bishop in 1950. Prior to leaving Romania, he transferred his administrative duties to Iosif Gonciu, who in turn left them to Ioan Robu in 1983.
