= Cornel Damian =

Romanian cleric

His Excellency Cornel Damian
- Auxiliary Bishop of Bucharest
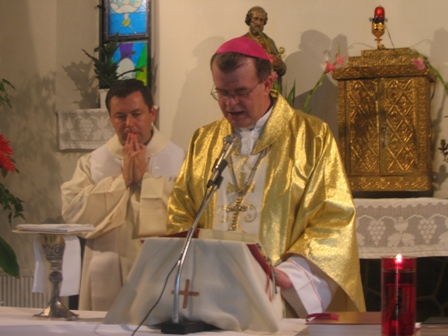
- Church: Roman Catholic
- Archdiocese: Bucharest
- Appointed: 31 October 2003
- Installed: 8 December 2003

Orders
- Ordination: 22 June 1986
- Consecration: 8 December 2003 by Ioan Robu

Personal details
- Born: May 8, 1960 (age 66) Jibou, Romania
- Coat of arms

Cornel Damian (born May 8, 1960) is a Romanian cleric, auxiliary bishop of the Roman Catholic Archdiocese of Bucharest. Born in Jibou, he moved with his family to Drobeta-Turnu Severin, where he finished high school. His parents were Greek-Catholic, but as their church was banned under the communist regime, Damian was raised in the Roman Catholic tradition. He attended the Roman Catholic Theological Institute of Iași and was ordained a priest in 1986 at Saint Joseph's Cathedral in Bucharest. He was assistant priest at the Cioplea Church and from 1987 to 1998 parish priest at another Bucharest parish. He began teaching moral theology in 1991 at a theological institute which opened that year. From 1998 to 2002 he studied canon law at the Pontifical Gregorian University in Rome. In 2002 he was assigned to a new parish and began teaching canon law. In 2003, having been chosen auxiliary bishop by Pope John Paul II, he was consecrated titular bishop of Iziriana at the Bucharest cathedral by Archbishop Ioan Robu.
