= Ioan Robu =

Romanian prelate

His Excellency Ioan Robu S.T.D.
- Archbishop emeritus of Bucharest
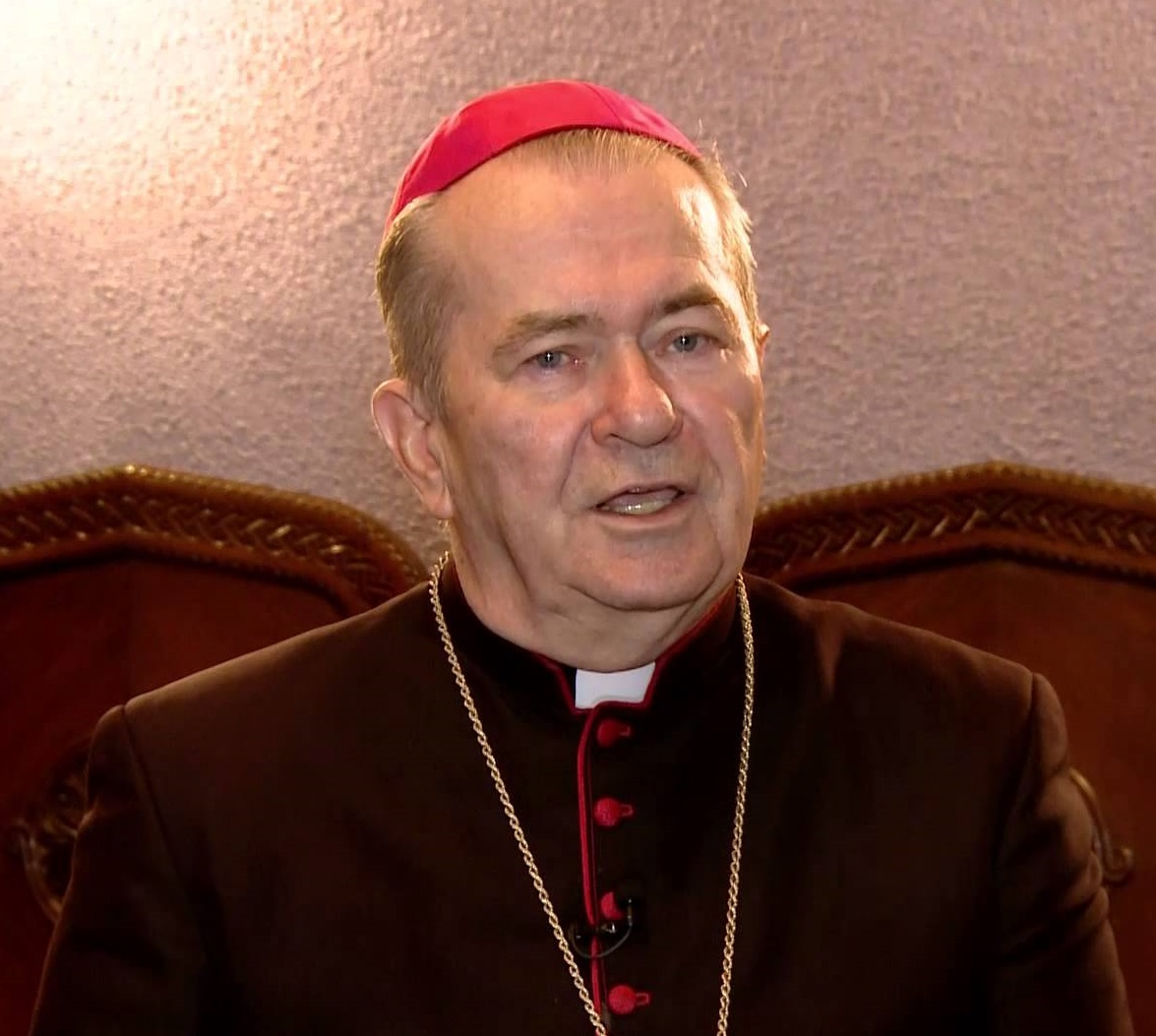
- Appointed: 14 March 1990
- Term ended: 21 November 2019
- Predecessor: Alexandru Theodor Cisar
- Successor: Aurel Percă
- Other posts: Apostolic Administrator of Bucharest (1984–1990); Titular Bishop of Cellae in Proconsulari (1984–1990)

Orders
- Ordination: August 15, 1968
- Consecration: December 8, 1984 by Agostino Casaroli

Personal details
- Born: November 6, 1944 (age 82) Târgu Secuiesc, Romania
- Denomination: Roman Catholic
- Residence: Bucharest, Romania
- Education: Alphonsian Academy of the Pontifical Lateran University
- Motto: Et veritas liberavit vos (English: And the truth will make you free)(John 8:32)
- Coat of arms: Ioan Robu's coat of arms

Ordination history of Ioan Robu
History
Priestly ordination
- Ordained by: Petru Pleșca
Episcopal consecration
- Principal consecrator: Agostino Cardinal Casaroli
- Co-consecrators: Luigi Cardinal Pogi, Archbishop Mario Schierano
Episcopal succession
Bishops consecrated by Ioan Robu as principal consecrator
- Cornel Damian: December 8, 2003

Ioan Robu (born November 6, 1944) is a Romanian prelate of the Roman Catholic Church. He was Archbishop of Bucharest from 1990 to 2019.

== Biography ==
Robu was born in Târgu Secuiesc, where his father, a native of Traian, Neamț County, had briefly come to work. A graduate of the Roman Catholic Theological Institute of Iași, he was ordained to the priesthood on 15 August 1968. He then served at the Roman Catholic parish in Craiova and at Saint Joseph's Cathedral in Bucharest. He studied at the Pontifical Lateran University's Alphonsian Academy from 1973 to 1977, earning a Doctor of Sacred Theology degree. During the summer of 1977, he was a parish priest in Buzău, and from 1977 to 1983 he was director of his alma mater in Iaşi.

On 25 October 1984 Pope John Paul II named him apostolic administrator of the Archdiocese of Bucarest and titular bishop of Cellae in Proconsulari. He received his episcopal consecration on 8 December in Rome from Cardinal Agostino Casaroli. On 14 March 1990 he was appointed Archbishop of Bucarest.

Pope Francis accepted his resignation on 21 November 2019.
