= Cellae in Proconsulari =

Cellae in Proconsulari was an ancient city and bishopric in Roman Africa, which remains a Latin titular see.

== History ==
The Roman Era civitas (city) in Roman North Africa is tentatively identified with ruins at Ain Zouarin in modern Tunisia. The location of this city is known thanks to a milestone that has revealed the site.

The city was one of many in the Late Roman province of Africa Proconsularis which were important enough to become the seat of an ancient episcopal see, suffragan of the primatial Metropolitan of Carthage, but later faded.

Morcelli mentions only one bishop, Cipriano, who was among the Catholic prelates summoned to Carthage in 484 by the Vandal king Huneric . Mesnage and Ferron instead attribute this seat two other bishops, Honorius and Casto, who took part in the Conference of Carthage (411), which saw gathered together Catholic bishops and Donatists of Roman Africa.

Morcelli mentions another venue Cellensis, which ranks in the Roman province of Byzacena. According to Ferron that would refer in fact to the diocese of Zella.

== Titular see ==
In 1933 the diocese was nominally restored as titular bishopric Cellae in Proconsulari, of the lowest (episcopal) rank.

It has had the following incumbents, so far of fitting episcopal rank:

- Félix María Torres Parra (1966.06.04 – 1969.04.25) as Auxiliary Bishop of Cartagena (Colombia) (1966.06.04 – 1969.04.25); later Bishop of Sincelejo (Colombia) (1969.04.25 – 1980.12.11), Bishop of Santa Marta (Colombia) (1980.12.11 – 1987.05.11), Metropolitan Archbishop of Barranquilla (Colombia) (1987.05.11 – 1999.03.18)
- Juan Ignacio Larrea Holguín (1969.05.17 – 1980.06.28) as Auxiliary Bishop of Quito (Ecuador) (1969.05.17 – 1980.06.28?); later Bishop of Ibarra (Ecuador) (1980.06.28 – 1983.08.05), last Military Vicar of Ecuador (1983.08.05 – 1986.07.21) and Titular Bishop of Novi (1983.08.05 – 1988.03.25) promoted first Military Ordinary of Ecuador (1986.07.21 – 1989.12.07), then Coadjutor Archbishop of Guayaquil (Ecuador) (1988.03.25 – 1989.12.07) succeeding as Metropolitan Archbishop of Guayaquil (1989.12.07 – retired 2003.05.07), died 2006
- Felipe María Zalba Elizalde, Dominican Order (O.P.) (1980.12.18 – 1984.02.29) as Auxiliary Bishop of Arequipa (Peru) (1980.12.18 – 1984.02.29), later Bishop-Prelate of Territorial Prelature of Chuquibamba (Peru) (1984.02.29 – death 1999.10.19)
- Ioan Robu (1984.10.25 – 1990.03.14) as Apostolic Administrator of București (Bucharest, Romania) (1984.10.25 – 1990.03.14); later succeeding as Metropolitan Archbishop of Bucharest (Romania) (1990.03.14 – ...), also President of Episcopal Conference of Romania (1994–1998, 2001–2004, 2007.05 – 2010.06, 2012.11 – 2016.05.11), Vice-President of Episcopal Conference of Romania (2016.05.11 – ...)
- Emilio Aranguren Echeverria (1991.04.30 – 1995.04.01) as Auxiliary Bishop of Cienfuegos–Santa Clara (Cuba) (1991.04.30 – 1995.04.01), later succeeding as Bishop of Cienfuegos (Cuba) (1995.04.01 – 2005.11.14), Bishop of Holguín (Cuba) (2005.11.14 – ...)
- Eugenio Arellano Fernandez, Comboni Missionaries (M.C.C.J.) (1995.06.01 – ...), Apostolic Vicar of Esmeraldas (Ecuador).

== See also ==
- List of Catholic dioceses in Tunisia

== Sources and external links ==
- GCatholic
