= Aurel Percă =

Romanian prelate of the Catholic Church (born 1951)

His Excellency Aurel Percă
- Archbishop of Bucharest
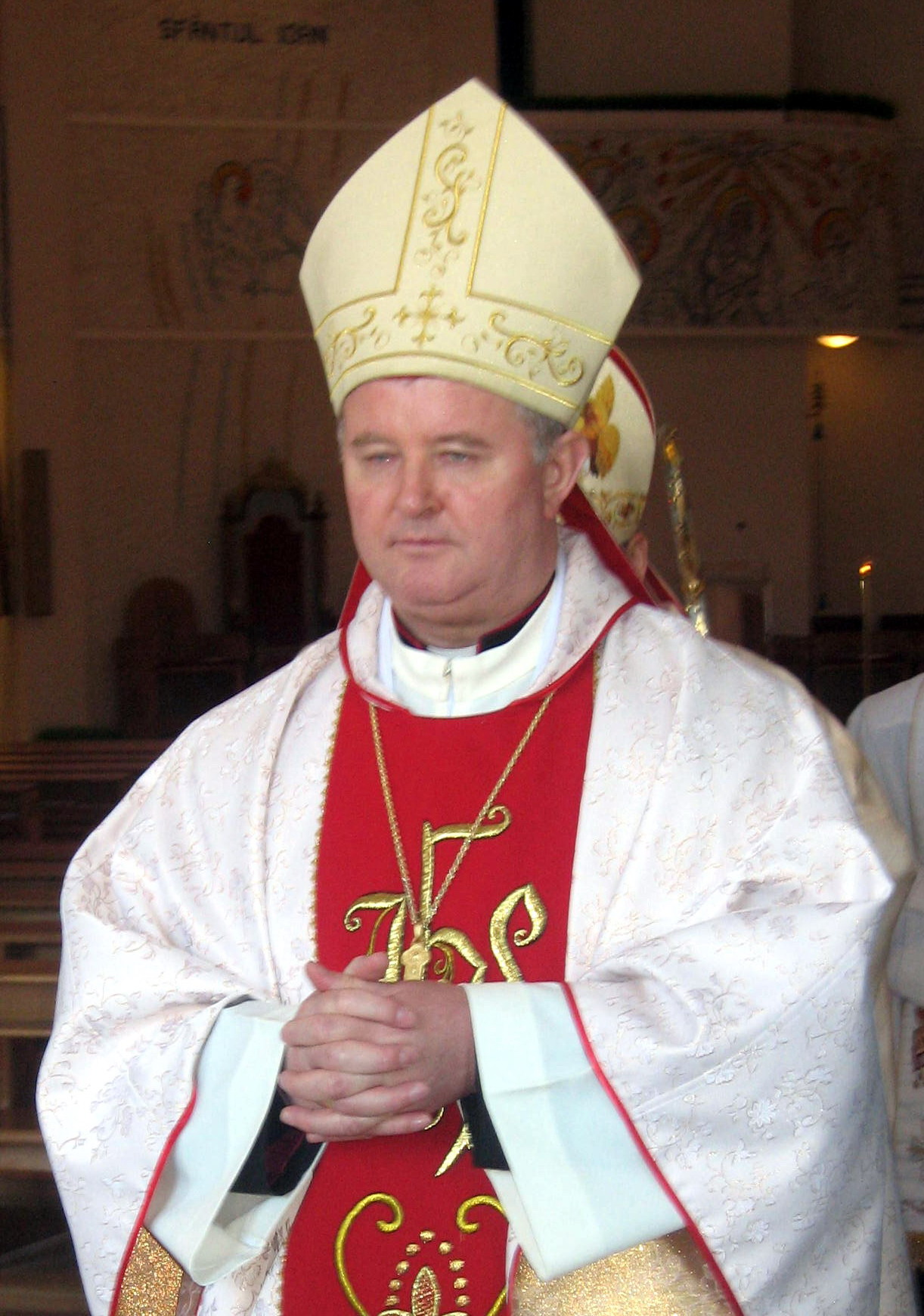
- Church: Roman Catholic
- Diocese: Archdiocese of Bucharest
- Appointed: 21 November 2019
- Installed: 11 January 2020
- Predecessor: Ioan Robu

Orders
- Ordination: 29 June 1979
- Consecration: 8 Dec 1999 by Petru Gherghel

Personal details
- Born: August 15, 1951 (age 74) Săbăoani, Romania
- Motto: In Caritate Radicati Et Fundati
- Coat of arms

Aurel Percă (born August 15, 1951) is a Romanian prelate of the Catholic Church who was named Archbishop of Bucharest on 21 November 2019. He served as auxiliary bishop of Iași from 1999 to 2019.

== Biography ==
Born in Săbăoani, Neamț County, he attended high school there and completed his studies at the Roman Catholic Theological Institute of Iași in 1969. He was ordained a priest in 1979 and became assistant priest at a parish in Bacău. He earned degrees in Eastern theology from the Pontifical Oriental Institute and in moral theology from the Alphonsian Academy.

In 1985, he became a professor of moral theology and patristics at the Iaşi seminary and was its rector from 1989 to 1994. In 1994 he was named vicar general of the archdiocese while continuing to teach. In 1999 Pope John Paul II named him auxiliary bishop of Iași. He received his episcopal consecration as titular bishop of Mauriana.

Pope Francis named him Archbishop of Bucharest on 21 November 2019.
