= DN28 =

Road in Romania

National Road 28
- Drumul Național 28
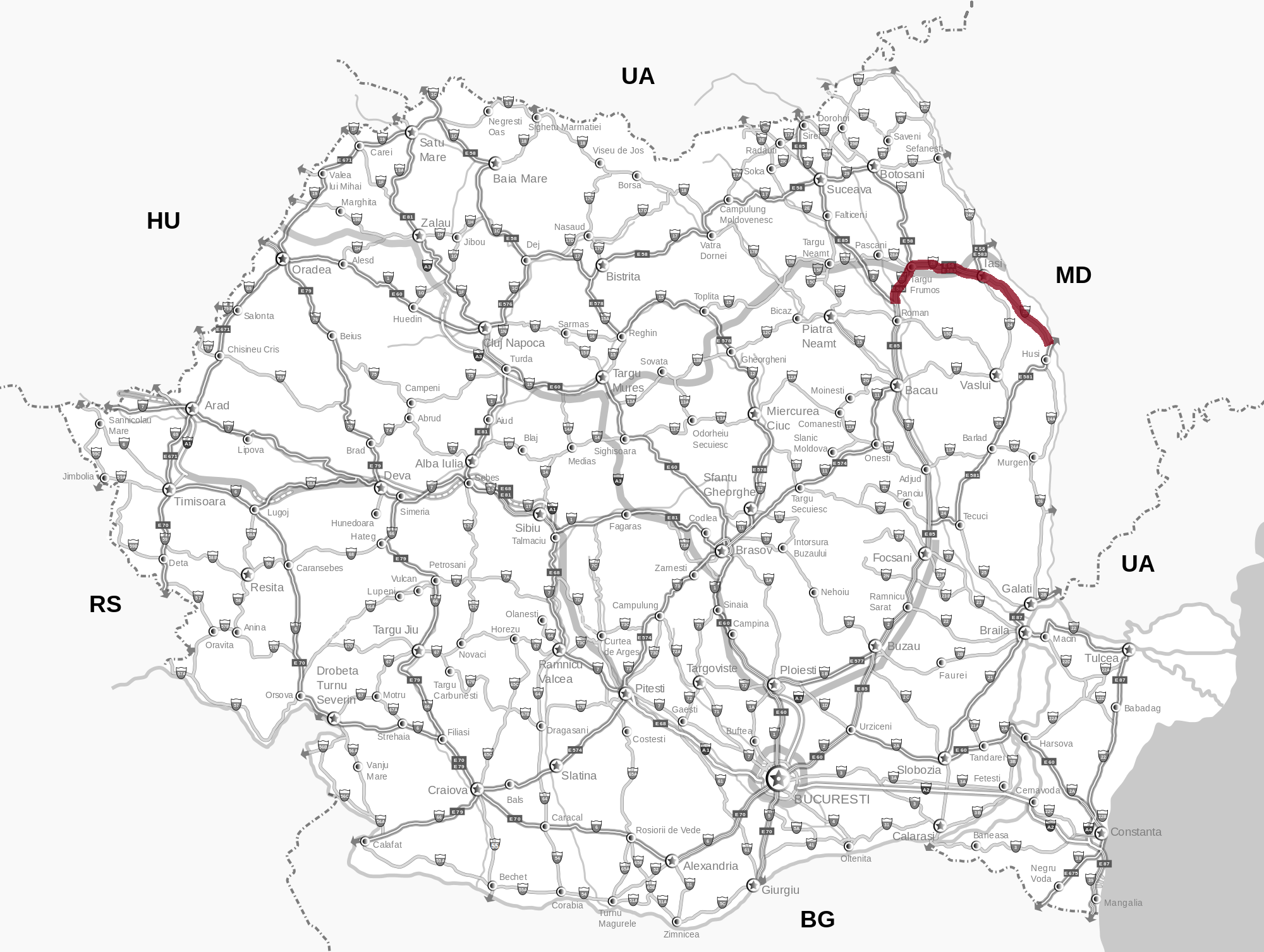

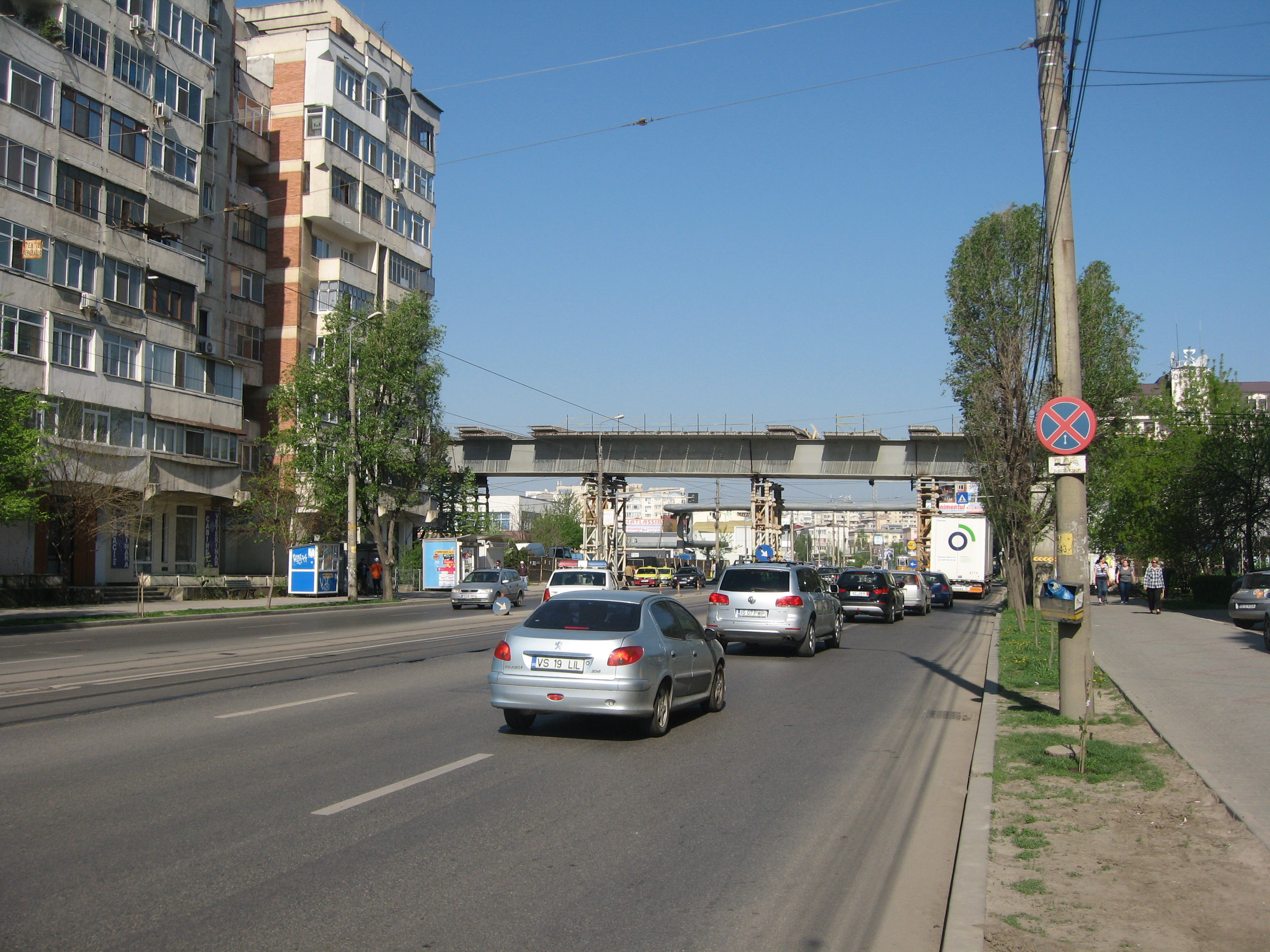

Route information
- Part of E58 E581 E583
- Maintained by Compania Națională de Autostrăzi și Drumuri Naționale din România
- Length: 141.2 km (87.7 mi)

Major junctions
- West end: Săbăoani
- East end: Albița

Location
- Country: Romania
- Counties: Neamț, Iași, Vaslui

Highway system
- Roads in Romania; Highways

DN28 (Romanian: Drumul Național 28) is a national road in Romania, located entirely within the historical region of Moldavia. The road starts in Săbăoani, near Roman and crosses through the cities of Târgu Frumos and Iași, ending in Albița, near the border with Moldova.

Between Săbăoani and Iași, the road is part of the European route E583 of the International E-road network. Similarly with DN2 between Bucharest and Săbăoani, the Săbăoani – Iași segment of DN28 has one lane per direction with one narrow emergency lane. The rest of the road is a simple two-lane road.

== See also ==
- Roads in Romania
- Transport in Romania
