= Apostolic Vicariate of Esmeraldas =

Catholic missionary jurisdiction in Ecuador

Apostolic Vicariate of Esmeraldas Apostolicus Vicariatus Esmeraldensis

Location
- Country: Ecuador

Statistics
- Area: 15,260 km^{2} (5,890 sq mi)
- Population: Total; Catholics: (as of 2010); 542,000; 493,000 (91%)
- Parishes: 22

Information
- Denomination: Catholic Church
- Rite: Roman Rite
- Established: 14 December 1945 (79 years ago)
- Cathedral: Catedral Cristo Rey

Current leadership
- Pope: Francis
- Apostolic Vicar: Antonio Crameri, S.S.C.
- Bishops emeritus: Eugenio Arellano Fernández, M.C.C.I.

Map
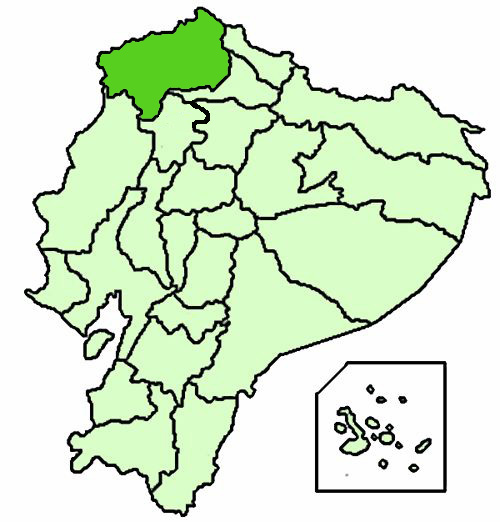

The Apostolic Vicariate (or Vicariate Apostolic) of Esmeraldas (Latin: Apostolicus Vicariatus Esmeraldensis) is a missionary pre-diocesan circonscription of the Roman Catholic Church. Its cathedral see Catedral Cristo Rey is located in the town of Esmeraldas in Ecuador's homonymous Pacific coastal province. It is exempt, i.e. directly subject to the Holy See, not part of any ecclesiastical province.

== History ==
On 14 December 1945 Pope Pius XII established the Apostolic Prefecture of Esmeraldas on territory split from the Diocese of Portoviejo.

It was elevated to an Apostolic Vicariate by the same pope on 14 November 1957.

== Ordinaries ==
All have been missionary members of a Latin Catholic order

Apostolic Prefect

- Jeroteo della SSma Vergine del Carmelo, OCD (25 October 1946 – 28 July 1954)

Apostolic Vicars

- Angelo Barbisotti, FSCJ, Titular Bishop of Caunas (14 November 1957 – 17 September 1972)
- Enrico Bartolucci Panaroni, MCCI, Titular Bishop of Castulo (14 June 1973 – 10 February 1995)
- Eugenio Arellano Fernández, MCCI, Titular Bishop of Cellæ in Proconsulari (1 June 1995 – 5 July 2021)
- Antonio Crameri, SSC, Titular Bishop of Apollonia (5 July 2021 – present)

== See also ==
- Roman Catholicism in Ecuador

== Sources and external links ==
- GigaCatholic, with incumbent biography links
