= Săbăoani =

- Commune
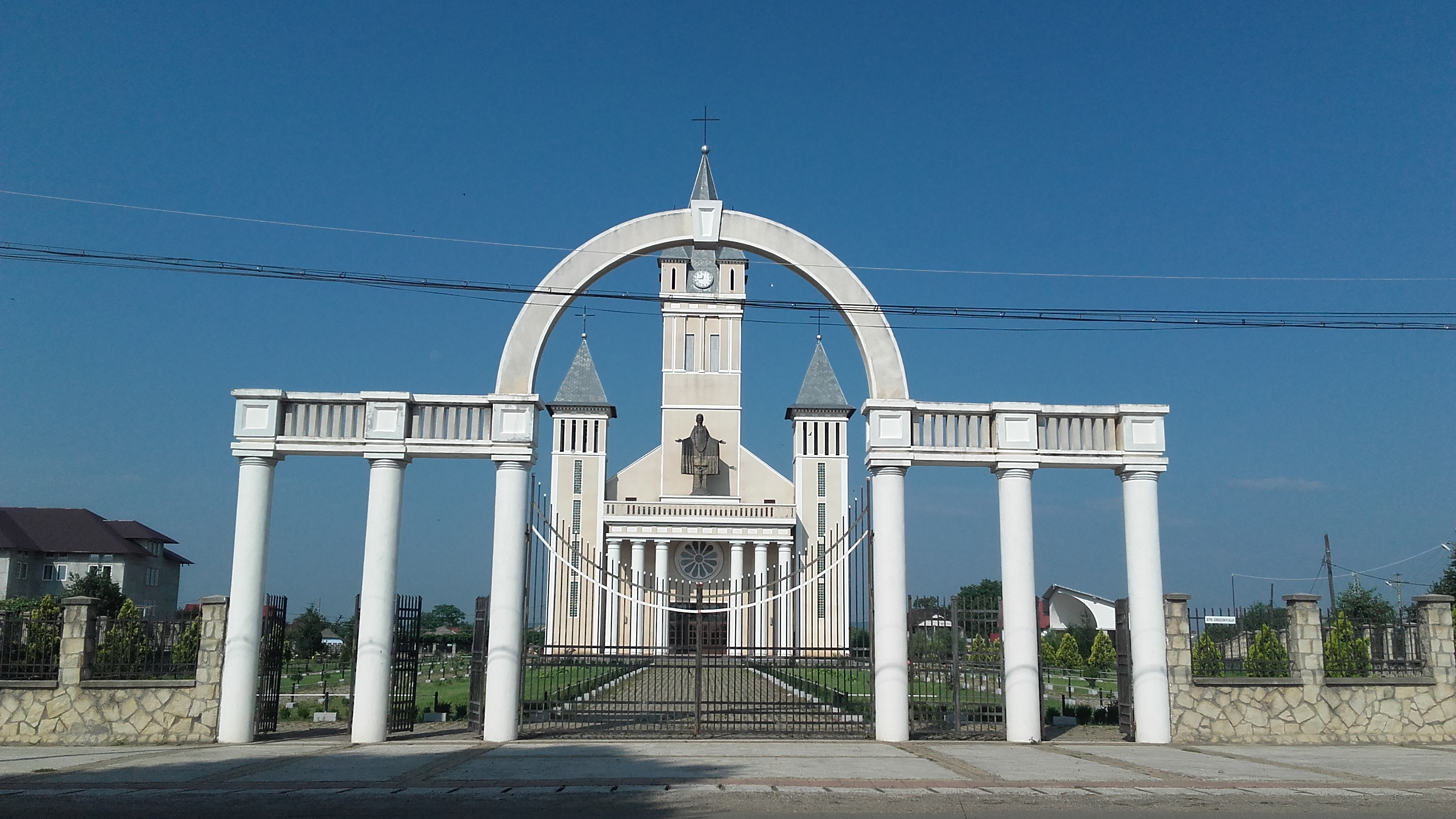
- Catholic Church in Săbăoani

- Location in Neamț County

- Location in Romania
- Coordinates: 47°1′N 26°51′E
- Country: Romania
- County: Neamț

Government
  - Mayor (2024–2028): Florin Vîrgă (USR)
- Area: 31.5 km^{2} (12.2 sq mi)
- Elevation: 230 m (750 ft)
- Population (2021-12-01): 10,619
  - Density: 337/km^{2} (873/sq mi)
- Time zone: UTC+02:00 (EET)
  - Summer (DST): UTC+03:00 (EEST)
- Postal code: 617400
- Area code: +(40) 233
- Vehicle reg.: NT
- Website: www.primariasabaoani.ro

Săbăoani (Hungarian: Szabófalva) is a commune in Neamț County, Western Moldavia, Romania. It is composed of two villages, Săbăoani and Traian.

== Geography ==
Situated in the eastern part of the county, on the border with Iași County, Săbăoani is the largest rural settlement in Neamț County. It is located at a distance of 12 km (7.5 mi) north of Roman and 57 km (35 mi) east of the county capital, Piatra Neamț.

The commune is traversed south to north by national road DN2 (part of European route E85). Route DN28 starts in Săbăoani; bifurcating from DN2, it goes east towards Iași and on to the border with Moldova. The Săbăoani train station serves the CFR Line 500, which starts in Bucharest and runs north, to the border with Ukraine.

== Demographics ==
Historical population
Year	Pop.	±%
1898	2,462	—
1930	4,448	+80.7%
1992	11,724	+163.6%
2002	10,301	−12.1%
2011	9,901	−3.9%
2021	10,619	+7.3%
Source: Census data

In 2002, the commune had a population of 10,301, of whom all but four were declared ethnic Romanians; 98.6% of residents were Roman Catholic, 1.3% Romanian Orthodox, and 0.1% belonged to other Christian denominations. At the 2021 census, Săbăoani had a population of 10,619, of whom 92.31% were Romanians.

== Natives ==
- Aurel Percă (born 1951), prelate of the Catholic Church, Archbishop of Bucharest since 2019
- Mihai Robu (1884 – 1944), cleric, bishop of the Roman Catholic Diocese of Iași
- Valentin Robu (born 1967), rower
