= Roman Catholic Archdiocese of Bucharest =

Roman Catholic archdiocese in Romania

Coordinates: 44.4421°N 26.0913°E

Archdiocese of Bucharest Archidioecesis Bucarestiensis Arhidieceza de București

Catholic
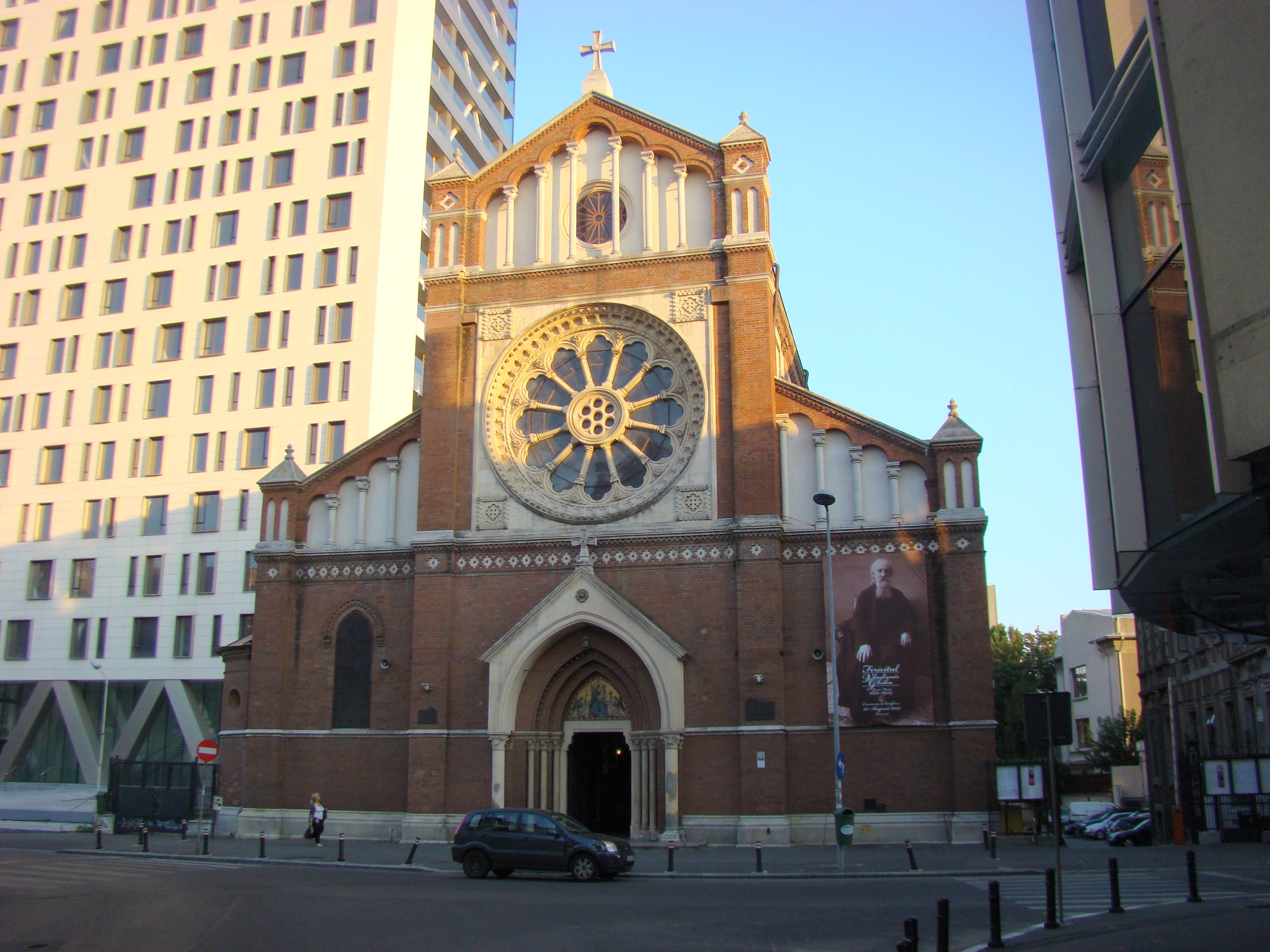
- St. Joseph Cathedral

Location
- Country: Romania
- Ecclesiastical province: Bucharest
- Deaneries: 6

Statistics
- Area: 91,120 km^{2} (35,180 sq mi)
- Population: Total; Catholics: (as of 2015); ▼8,740,000; ▼61,050 (▼0.7%)
- Parishes: 68

Information
- Denomination: Catholic
- Sui iuris church: Latin Church
- Rite: Roman Rite
- Established: 27 April 1883
- Cathedral: Saint Joseph Cathedral, Bucharest

Current leadership
- Pope: Leo XIV
- Metropolitan Archbishop: Aurel Percă
- Suffragans: Diocese of Iași, Diocese of Oradea Mare, Diocese of Satu Mare, Diocese of Timişoara
- Auxiliary Bishops: Cornel Damian
- Vicar General: Cornel Damian
- Episcopal Vicars: Martin Cabalaș, Ieronim Iacob, Francisc Ungureanu

Map
- Administrative map of the Roman Catholic Church in Romania

Website
- arcb.ro

The Archdiocese of Bucharest (Latin: Archidioecesis Bucarestiensis) is the Latin Metropolitan archdiocese of the Catholic Church in Romania.

Its cathedral episcopal see is Bucharest. Ioan Robu was the archbishop from 1990 until his retirement on 21 November 2019. He previously Apostolic Administrator since 25 October 1984. He was succeeded by Aurel Percă. Prior to his appointment, he was served as auxiliary bishop of Iaşi. .

== History ==
It was established on 27 April 1883. There had been a Catholic presence in the city since at least the 18th century, but only in 1847 Bishop Josephus Molajoni was able to establish his residence there. His successor, Angelus Parsi, restored the episcopal palace, which had been destroyed by fire in 1847, and in 1852 brought to Bucharest the English Ladies, and in 1861 the Brothers of the Christian Schools. In 1863 Bishop Parsi was succeeded by Josephus Pluym, from 1869 Patriarchal Vicar of Constantinople, who in turn was followed by Ignatius Paoli.

After the establishment of the Kingdom of Romania in 1881, a movement was initiated by the government to release the Catholic subjects from dependence on a foreign bishop, and negotiations were begun with Rome. Two years later, Pope Leo XIII raised the Apostolic Vicariate of Wallachia to an archdiocese, with Bucharest as residence, which was exempt, i.e. directly subordinate to the Vatican.

== Extent ==
It comprises 91,120 square kilometers (35,195 Square Miles). In addition to national capital Bucharest, the archdiocese covers the rest of Wallachia (Oltenia, Muntenia and Dobruja)—the counties of Mehedinți, Gorj, Dolj, Vâlcea, Olt, Argeș, Teleorman, Dâmbovița, Giurgiu, Prahova, Ilfov, Buzău, Ialomița, Călărași, Brăila, Tulcea and Constanța, of which 0.9% are Roman Catholic, with the largest number of parishes in Bucharest. Its adherents are predominantly Romanian.

== Province ==
Its ecclesiastical province comprises the Metropolitan's own Archdiocese and the following suffragans :

- Roman Catholic Diocese of Iași
- Roman Catholic Diocese of Oradea Mare
- Roman Catholic Diocese of Satu Mare
- Roman Catholic Diocese of Timișoara

== See also ==
- Romanian Catholic Eparchy of Saint Basil the Great of Bucharest (Byzantine Rite)
- History of Christianity in Romania

== Sources and external links ==
- (in Romanian) Official site
- CatholicHierarchy, with demographic and clerical statistics
