= Saint Joseph Cathedral, Bucharest =

Romanian monument and Catholic religious building

Saint Joseph Cathedral Catedrala Sfântul Iosif
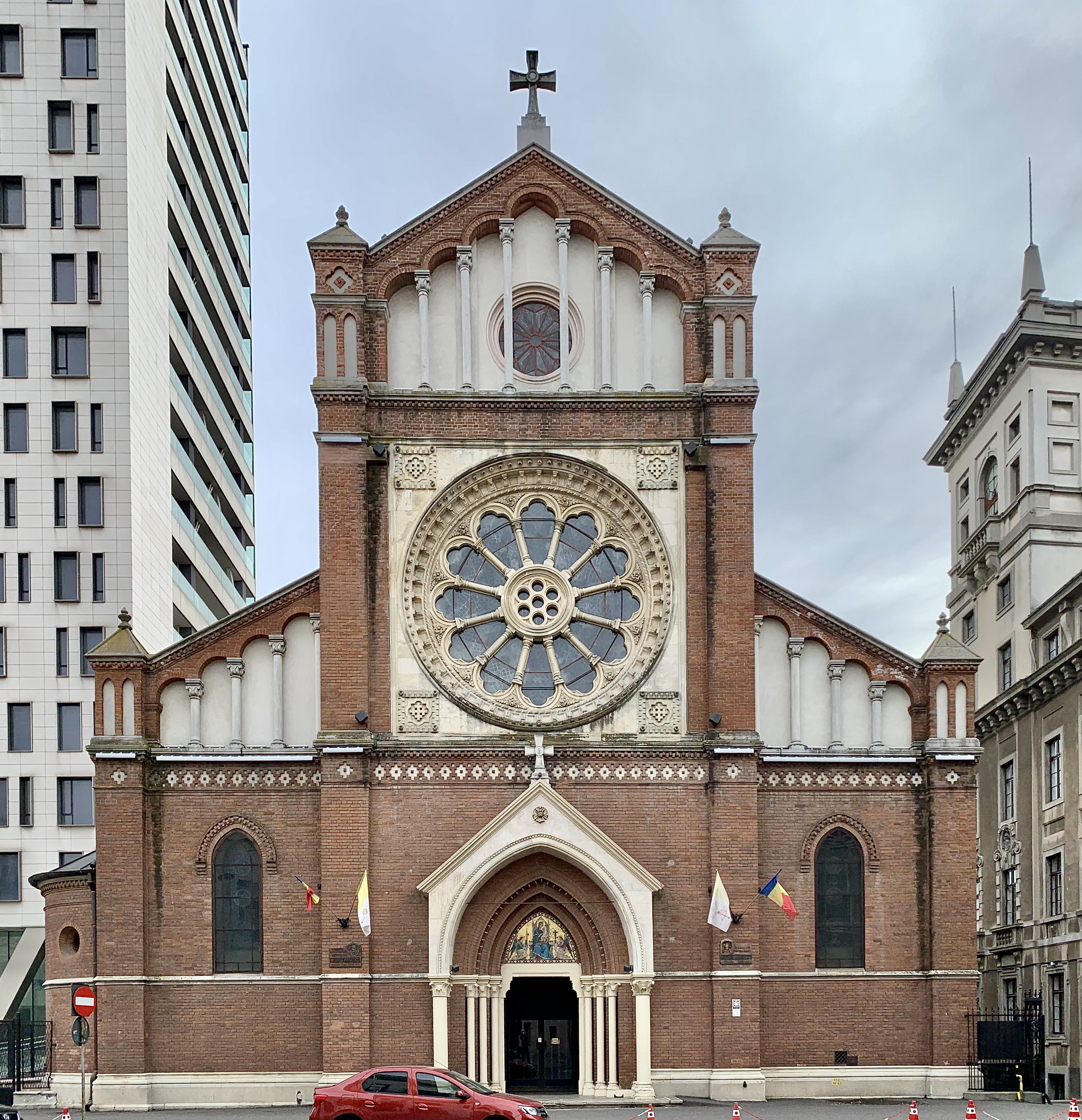
- Main facade of the Saint Joseph Cathedral

Religion
- Affiliation: Roman Catholic
- Diocese: Archdiocese of Bucharest
- Ecclesiastical or organizational status: Cathedral

Location
- Location: Bucharest, Romania
- Interactive map of Saint Joseph Cathedral; Catedrala Sfântul Iosif
- Coordinates: 44°26′32″N 26°05′29″E

Architecture
- Architects: Friedrich Schmidt, Carol Benesch
- Type: Church
- Style: Romanesque
- Groundbreaking: 1875
- Completed: 1883

Saint Joseph Cathedral (Romanian: Catedrala Sfântul Iosif) is a Catholic church in Bucharest, Romania, that serves as the cathedral of the Roman Catholic Archdiocese of Bucharest. It is located at 19 General Berthelot Street.

== History ==
The cathedral was built between 1875 and 1883 by architect Friedrich Schmidt in Vienna and Carol Benesch. Its building style belongs to historicism and especially lends style with Romanesque architecture features, with some elements of the Gothic architecture. The building is 40 m (130 ft) long and 22 m (72 ft) wide. It is the most famous Catholic church in Bucharest. The cathedral was consecrated by Archbishop Ignatius Paoli, on February 15, 1884, and was attended by "all the priests of the archdiocese, all seminarians, the entire diplomatic corps accredited in Bucharest, President of the Council of Ministers, the President of the Senate, City Hall and many others. Mihail Kogălniceanu, impressed the greatness of the worship catholic have to declare in the same year from the parliament, that this cathedral was "the most beautiful religious building that exists in Romania". "patron of the cathedral was chosen in honor of Saint Joseph and Mary (mother of Jesus). The feast day of the patron of the cathedral is March 19.

== Construction ==
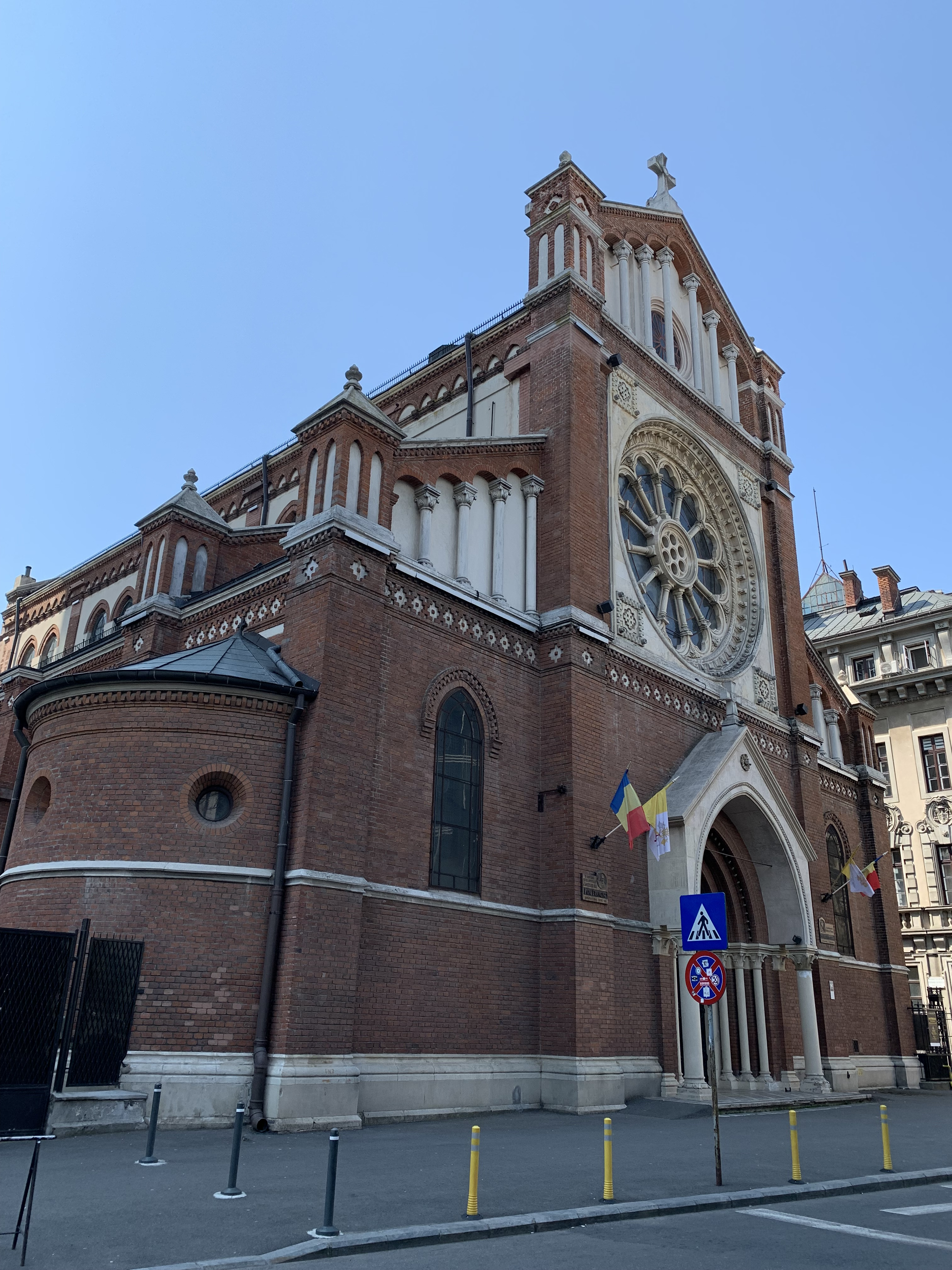
The cathedral's exterior

Saint Joseph is the metropolitan cathedral and seat of the archbishop. Its founder is Bishop Ignatius Paoli, from the Passionist Congregation of Monks, and he was the first Archbishop of the Roman Catholic Archdiocese of Bucharest. The money to build the cathedral came from believers in Bucharest, from various wealthy personalities, but also from foreign benefactors, acquaintances or friends of Bishop Paoli. The work was led by Dutch Passionist monk Alfons Zegers, an architect by training. He had been called to Bucharest from Passionist monastery in Dublin (Ireland), by Bishop Paoli. Since 1880, work on own were led by skilful architect Carol Benesch. The stone used in construction was brought from the quarries of Ruse, Bulgaria, and bricks were purchased from Bucharest and neighboring villages. Construction work began in the sanctuary apse, with ample facilities for land consolidation and raising it. Lack of funds and the outbreak of the Romanian War of Independence in 1877 made the work very hard to advance in stages until 1883. In the late autumn of this year construction was completed. On Friday, February 15, 1885, the Pontifical Mass was celebrated by Archbishop Ignatius Paoli for consecration and inauguration of Saint Joseph Cathedral. Archbishop was surrounded by all his priests, the seminarians studying at the seminary in carved and representatives of civil authorities: Delegate Council of Ministers, Minister of Foreign Affairs, President of the Senate, prefect of police, the mayor of Bucharest and Bucharest entire diplomatic corps. When lifting the palace residence of the Archbishop in 1925 was built a tower in which were mounted six bells of the cathedral. The resistance of the cathedral building was put in danger since the late 1990s by Cathedral Plaza Bucharest, a building whose construction was declared illegal by Suceava Court of Appeal.

== The interior ==
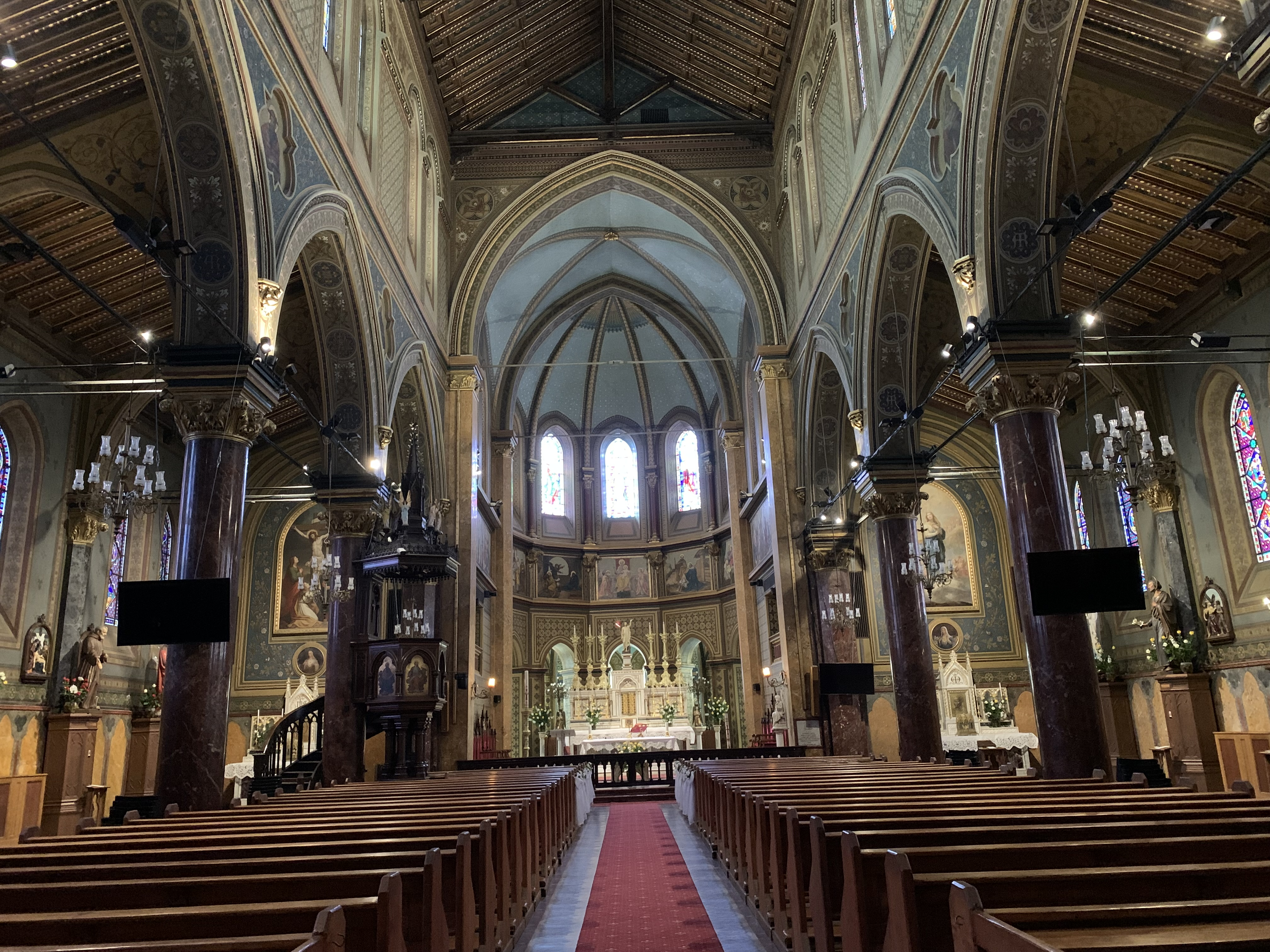
Interior of the cathedral, 2023

The main altar of the cathedral was executed in Rome in white Carrara marble, by architect Friedrich Schmidt and Carol Benesch, and then mounted in Bucharest by specialist Niccolo Orassi. Woodwork ceiling was apparently executed in Brasov. Mayer Company of Munich executed original Stained glass windows, destroyed in bombing of April 4, 1944, contained the eight large paintings of the apse windows with scenes from the life of Saint Joseph and the Holy Family, the seven medallions on the walls of the central nave mosaic "Mother of God" and two angels above the outer portal of the cathedral, as well as wood carvings of the Pulpit and the Bank for Holy Communion. Decorative painting of the Cathedral nave was executed by Georg Roder in Munich and painter Father Elsner executed decorative painting of the chapel and baptistery of the cathedral naves. Dressing the stucco colonnades, pillars and walls is the work of Italian workshop Aterio brothers. Actual stained glass was designed and executed by Natalia and Ion Brodeală couple in 1980. Large rosette above the organ, choir and the baptistery stained glass was executed in 1985 by the artist Dorin Danila. Chandeliers above the main altar and the candlestick for the Paschal candle was bought in Paris. Organ of the cathedral is one of the best organ concert in Romania. It is operated by an electro-pneumatic system that has three keyboards, flute 3375, 54 main registers and 36 auxiliary registers, with extensive possibilities of combinations required concerted practice. The organ was built and installed by the company L. Wegenstein in Timișoara in 1930, replacing the organ installed in 1892 by Merklin company in Paris. Between October 2009 and April 2010 was restored by Ferdinand Stemmer its Swiss organ.

== Renovations ==
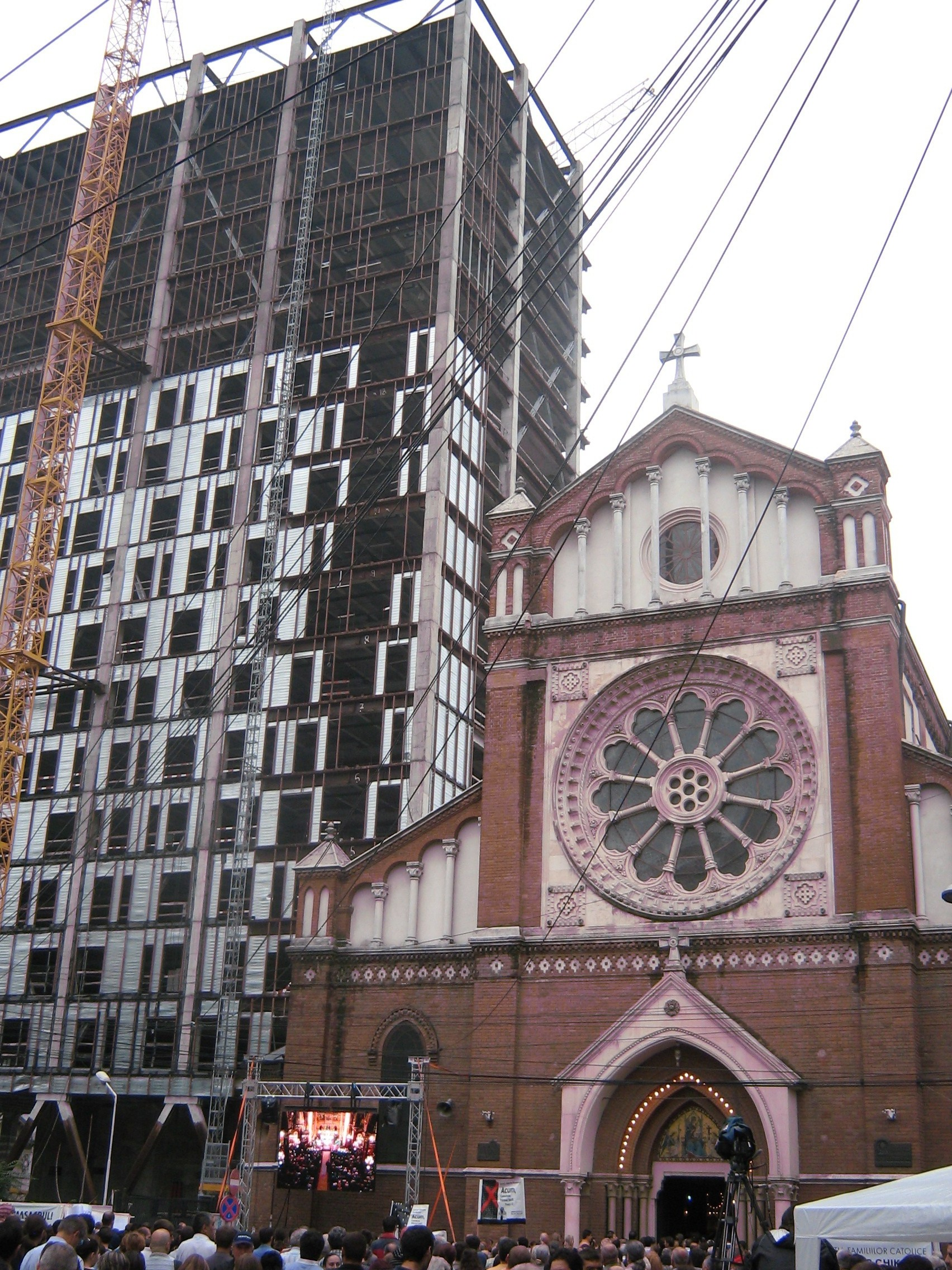
The illegally-built Cathedral Plaza Bucharest towering over the cathedral, pictured here during its construction in 2009

Saint Joseph Cathedral suffered significant damage from the earthquakes of 1929, 1940, 1977, 1986 and 1990, and also due to the American bombing of April 4, 1944 and the German August 24 to 25, 1944. Especially from March 4, 1977, earthquake destroyed many of the facilities inside and outside the cathedral. After each earthquake, the cathedral was repaired and strengthened, but only in parts. Only in 1991 were initiated extensive building works by a plan devised by engineer Professor Alexander Cişmigiu. This work was performed by a unitary thought plan for the entire edifice of the cathedral. In 1986 the works were finished painting the cathedral, begun by the painter Thomas Lasconi and completed the team led by Peter Shepherd. The cathedral is enhanced, but needs repair, both inside and outside. Following the earthquake of 1990 occurred sometimes cracks in the walls, vaults and especially deambulatoriul behind the altar. Because it rains inside, work is underway to replace the roof. Saint Joseph Cathedral was declared monument of art and architecture. And that's why Suceava Court of Appeal decided on 12 July 2011 that the building Cathedral Plaza Bucharest with 19 floors was built illegally who should have 19 floors removal by mayor of Bucharest, Sorin Oprescu.

== Parish ==
Territorial parish of the Saint Joseph Cathedral, with a separate area of the Barat parish, was established in 1900. Transcripts of parish registers that first baptism was celebrated on February 4, 1884, and the first marriage on May 3, 1884, while still not fully completed the construction and landscaping of the building of the cathedral. Originally, the Cathedral parish was so caring a very large territory, about half the area of Bucharest. In the years 1990–1991 were established, for better and effective pastoral care for the faithful six new parishes: "Blessed Redeemer", "Sacred Heart of Jesus", "Peter and Paul", Baneasa "Assumption", "Birth of Saint John the Baptist" and "Holy Guardian Angel". Now Cathedral parish is a small territory in the downtown area. Cathedral Parish does not have (from August 21, 1958) own rectory so that priests live in the archbishop's palace. The first priest mentioned first as a missionary and then as parish administrator, parish and canonical was Josephus Baud (1898–1911). There followed:

- Canon Carol Auner, priest (1911–1932);
- Joseph Schubert (bishop), parish and canonical (1932–1951), arrested on 17 February 1951;
- Despina Andrei (1952–1957);
- Emanuel Kreiss (1957–1960);
- Emil Kendelbacher, former vicar substitute (1960–1980);
- Eugen Szilaghyi – the vicar economy (1980–1982);
- Isidore Mărtincă – priest and dean (1983–1984);
- Joseph Cobzaru delegated between October 1, 1984, and August 1, 1985, as parish administrator;
- Eugen Bortoş – Parish (August 1, 1985 to 2010).
- Ioan Ciobanu – 2010, vicar.

Its community consists of 480 families, comprising approximately 1,700 people. Mass is usually celebrated in Romanian, in the chapel of the Cathedral it take Sundays and Spanish. Spanish community is made up mainly of members of the diplomatic corps in Bucharest who speak this language. They are governed by Father Cristinel Tampu. Cathedral has no branches, no own cemetery.

Parish: Fr Eugene Bortos Parochial vicars: Fr Mitica Baltag OFMC – spiritual Chancery program: o'clock weekdays: August 12, 15 19 Sundays and holidays the hours: 9–12, 3:19 p.m. Masses: on Sundays and holidays command at times: 7:00, 8:00, 9:00, 10:30, 12:15, 5:00 p.m., 6:30 p.m. during the week at times: 7:00, 8:00, 9:00, 5:00 p.m., 6:30 p.m. Sunday 24:15 am Mass celebrated in Spanish, in the chapel of the cathedral. Spanish community is made up mainly of members of the diplomatic corps in Bucharest who speak this language. They are governed by Father Gilbert Sebastian Iavorschi. a sister "Notre Dame de Sion" retired (Sr. Veronica) 12 Sisters of the Institute "Saint Mary", occupied with work in the house garden. Franciscan sister (in the house) engaged candles. Parochial Caritas by priests and young people seeking to help the poor of the parish, as well as those who come to the cathedral with various troubles.

A social worker dealing with the specific problems in this area of the parish. "Pro Deo", "Catholic Medical Organization," "Catholic Organization" – all belonging to the Archdiocese. A dispensary with a medicine cabinet and one of dentistry. A Primary School "Saint Anthony" belongs to the Foundation "Saint Andrew".

== Congregations and associations present ==
- Nuns Institute "St. Maria "
- Caritas parish, dedicated to works of charity
- "Pro Deo", Catholic Medical Organization, Catholic Organization – all belonging to the Archdiocese.
- "MCL Association – Christian Workers Movement" and the "neighbor" – collaboration for the "A chance for everyone" and "I'm listening" .
- "Durcovici Academy" – suggests conferences and educational programs.

== Events ==
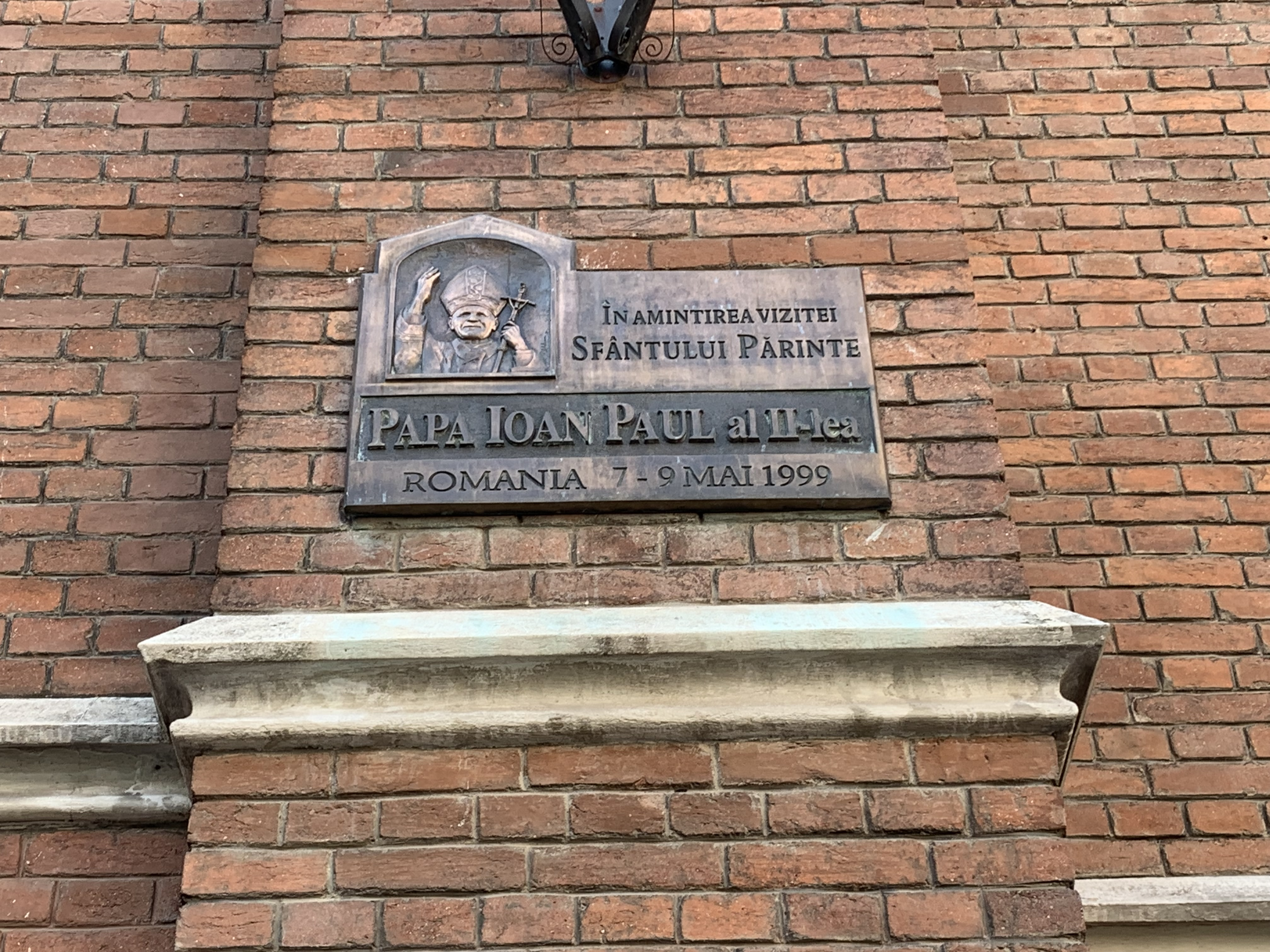
Commemorative plaque of Pope John Paul II's 1999 visit

On May 8, 1999, during his visit to Romania, Pope John Paul II concelebrated in the Saint Joseph Cathedral an Eastern Rite Mass together with the entire hierarchy of the Greek Catholic Church in Romania. Upon the pope's arrival, first there was baptism in the chapel where Cardinal Alexandru Todea greeted Bishop Joseph Schubert (bishop) on the night of November 19, 1950 when Alexander Todea, an underground Greek-Catholic priest, became a bishop.

== See also ==
- List of cathedrals in Romania
- Catholicism in Romania

== Bibliography ==
- Dănuț Doboș, Eugen Bortoș (editori): Parohia Catedralei Sf. Iosif din București. Monografie, Editura Arhiepiscopiei Romano-Catolice, București, 2005. ISBN 973-9386-81-4.
